= Manistee Area Public Schools =

School district in Michigan, United States

Address
- 525 12th Street Manistee, Manistee County, Michigan, 49660; United States

District information
- Grades: Pre-Kindergarten-12
- Superintendent: Ronald Stoneman
- Schools: 3
- Budget: $21,689,000 2022-2023 expenditures
- NCES District ID: 2622410

Students and staff
- Students: 1,247 (2024-2025)
- Teachers: 67.15 (on an FTE basis) (2024-2025)
- Staff: 159.57 FTE (2024-2025)
- Student–teacher ratio: 18.57 (2024-2025)

Other information
- Website: www.manisteemariners.org

Manistee Area Public Schools is a public school district in Northern Michigan. In Manistee County, it serves Manistee, Eastlake, Filer Township, and parts of the townships of Manistee and Stronach. In Mason County, it serves part of Grant Township.

== History ==
The first school in Manistee was established in 1852. In 1867, a new school was built that contained all grades in the city. It was expanded in 1870. The first high school classes were held in 1874 and the first class graduated in 1879.

A high school was built in Manistee around 1886. It was used until a new high school was built, then became an elementary school before being torn down in 1958. It was succeeded by the following high school buildings:

- On Maple Street between 7th and 8th Streets, a new high school opened in January 1927. When a new high school was built next to it in 1967, it became the junior high school. It was demolished in 2022.
- The building at 550 Maple Street, built in 1967, served as a high school until 2003, then became an elementary school. It was renamed Kennedy Elementary when the former Kennedy Elementary closed, and was renovated in 2022 to be the district's main elementary school, reopening as Manistee Elementary in fall 2025.
- The current middle/high school opened in February 2003. A swimming pool addition, paid for with donations, was built in 2009.

Five elementary schools were built between 1936 and 1964:

- Washington (Built 1936, closed 2004 and sold 2005.)
- Lincoln (Built 1950, became a community center in 1981 and sold in 2000.)
- Jefferson (Built 1954, used as Early Childhood Center as of 2024.)
- Kennedy (Built 1958, closed in 2011 and sold in 2015. Kennedy became the name of the elementary at 550 Maple Street.)
- Madison (Built 1964, undergoing renovations as of 2024.)

The district has faced challenges related to declining enrollment and revenue. Four factory closures during the 1980s resulted in the loss of about 1,500 jobs in Manistee. In response to the associated drop in funding, the district made cuts to services and programs and some classes became overcrowded. The football field fell into disrepair and certain textbooks became scarce. In 1993, with an enrollment of about 2,000 students, the Associated Press profiled the district's financial difficulties, describing Manistee as "a case study in the inequities created by Michigan's school financing system," and noting, "Many students say their interests are overlooked as adults squabble over money and responsibility."

By 2012, enrollment had declined to approximately 1,600 students, and the district offered buyouts to teachers due to a budget deficit.

In 2022, voters felt that the district's financial condition had improved enough to approve a $30.855 million bond issue to renovate district facilities, including creating a consolidated elementary school within Kennedy Elementary (which the 1967 former high school building was later called). That school, now called Manistee Elementary, reopened in fall 2025.

=== Mascot controversy ===
In an effort to avoid the offensive stereotypes associated with Native American imagery, the district discontinued use of the Chippewas mascot in 2022. In 2023, Mariners was chosen as the new mascot, beating the Whitecaps in a community vote.

== Schools ==
Schools in Manistee Area Public Schools district
School	Address	Notes
Manistee Middle/High School	525 Twelfth Street, Manistee	Grades 6-12. Built 2003.
Manistee Elementary	550 Maple St, Manistee	Grades 1-5. Built 1967.
Manistee Early Childhood Center	515 Bryant Ave, Manistee	Grades PreK-K. Formerly Jefferson Elementary. Built 1964.
Michigan Great Lakes Virtual Academy		Online charter school authorized by Manistee Area Public Schools
