= Vogue Theatre =

Vogue Theater or Vogue Theatre may refer to:

== Canada ==
- Vogue Theatre (Vancouver)
- Amethyst Theatre, formerly the Vogue Theatre in McAdam, New Brunswick

== United States ==
- The Vogue Theater, in Chula Vista, California.
- Vogue Theatre (California), in Hollywood, California
- Vogue Theatre, in San Francisco, home of Mostly British Film Festival
- List of theatres in Louisville, Kentucky § Vogue Theatre
- Vogue Theatre (Michigan), in Manistee, Michigan

== See also ==
- Vogue (disambiguation)
