= Manistee Central Business District =

Historic district in Michigan, US

- U.S. National Register of Historic Places
- U.S. Historic district
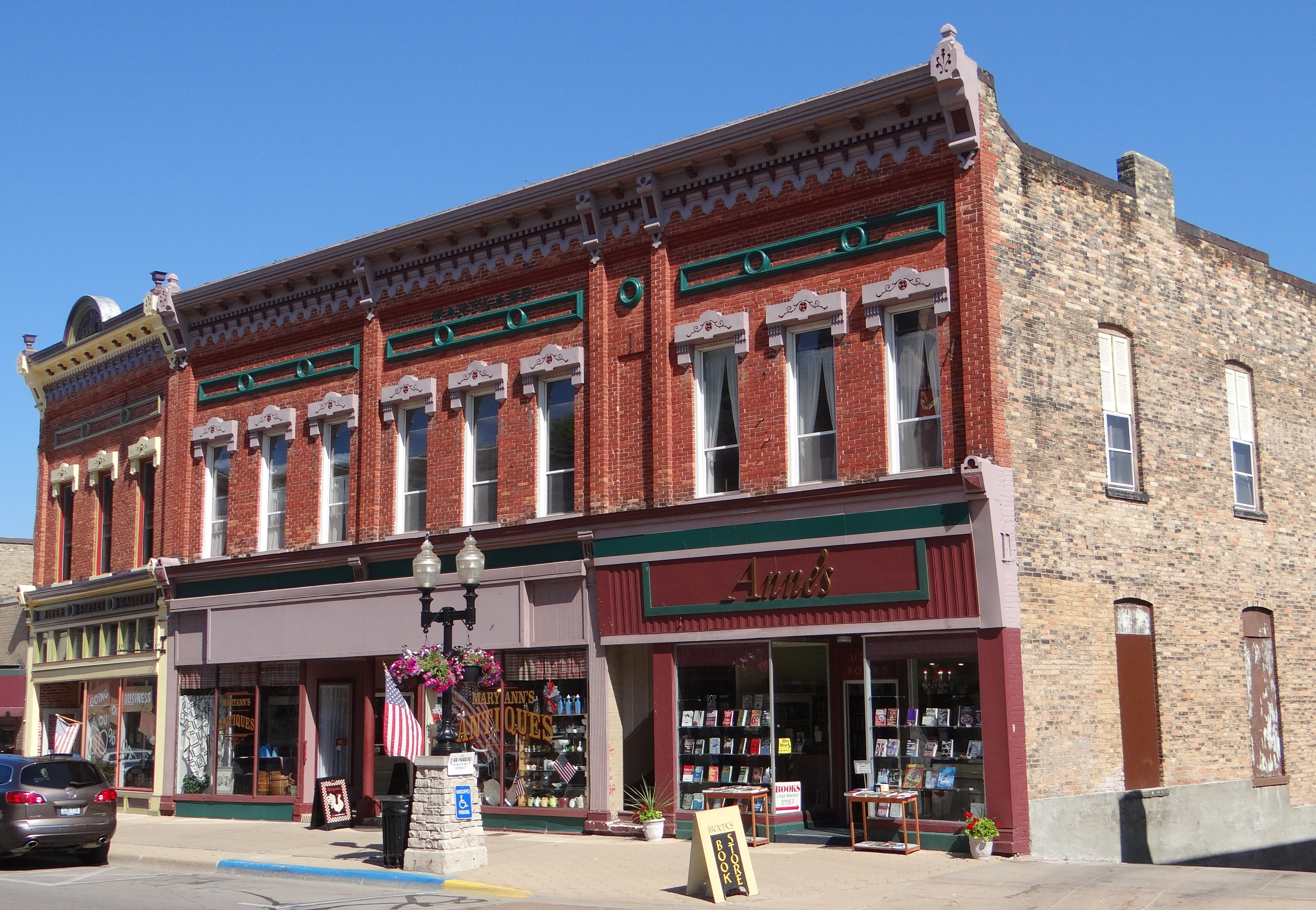
- Maryland Building

- Location within Michigan Location within the United States
- Interactive map
- Location: Roughly bounded by Maple, Washington, Water and River Sts., Manistee, Michigan
- Coordinates: 44°14′54″N 86°19′26″W
- Area: 23 acres (9.3 ha)
- Built: 1850
- Architect: Multiple
- Architectural style: Classical Revival, Italianate, Romanesque
- NRHP reference No.: 82002851
- Added to NRHP: May 7, 1982

The Manistee Central Business District is a commercial historic district roughly bounded by Maple, Washington, Water and River Streets in Manistee, Michigan. It was listed on the National Register of Historic Places in 1982.

== History ==
The City of Manistee was founded in 1841 when John and Joseph Stronach established a sawmill within the present city limits of Manistee. The city almost immediately became a lumber boom town, with 200 people living there in 1852 and 1000 by 1861. In the 1860s, the city grew even further, with 300 buildings constructed in 1869 alone. Nearly all of these buildings were constructed of wood, and on October 8, 1871, a catastrophic fire destroyed most of the downtown and the surrounding industrial areas. The fire resulted in the subsequent re-construction of a newdowntown, with buildings predominately of high-quality brick in an Italianate style.

In 1878, rock salt was discovered near the city, and the industry grew as the lumber industry declined. The result was that by 1900 Manistee was home to 22,700 people. However, as the century progressed, the city's population dropped to around 8000 people. In fact, only limited new construction was undertaken after the construction of the Manistee County Savings Bank in 1907. The lack of new construction, though, has also left a downtown area with a historic feel, with fiew demolitions or architectural alterations.

== Description ==
The Manistee Commercial Historic District consists of buildings surrounding Manistee's two major cross streets, River Street and Maple Street. The district contains 91 structures, of which 85 of the buildings are commercial structures, with three residences, four public buildings, and two fraternal lodges. Twenty of the buildings are not historically contributing. The contributing buildings are primarily brick Victorian commercial buildings constructed between 1870 and 1910.

Significant buildings in the district include:

- Dunham House (1878) The original portion of the Dunham House, built in 1878, was a three-story-high hotel containing 40 hotel rooms. In 1883, the hotel doubled in size, and is now approximately 160 feet by 120 feet. It is an Italianate structure with five bays along the main facade.
- Ramsdell Theatre (1903) The Ramsdell Theatre and associated hall are built of deep red brick. The front entrance is through a formal a Doric portico, with a front facade topped with a boxed pedimented cornice.
- Vogue Theatre (1938) The Vogue Theatre exterior has strong horizontal and vertical lines, presenting a dramatic contrast to the surrounding buildings.
- Manistee County Savings Bank (1906–07) The Manistee County Savings Bank was designed by Albert E. Colcord of Chicago. It is a three-story building constructed of Bedford limestone. The facade is divided in half at the first floor, with one half containing two stores, and the other half containing the main banking room. Offices were on the second floor, and the third floor house a Knights of Pythias Lodge.
- Ramsdell Building' (1891) The Ramsdell Building is a four-story Richardsonian Romanesque structure with a unique corner turret.
- Haley Block (1883) The Haley Block is a two-story brick building, measuring about sixty feet in width, is divided into three storefront bays.
- Pacific House (1880–87) Joseph Baur built two stores at this location in 1880. He soon added three more, then a second story level spanning the entire block, which opened as a hotel in 1884. The hotel was located near the newly opened Flint and Pere Marquette Railroad passenger station, and business was good enough that Bauer expanded his hotel in 1887. The building was then 120 feet by 120 feet
- Winkler Block (1894–95) This masonry building is approximately 75 feet wide, consisting of three bays. The most distinctive architectural feature of the building is the corner turret. The turret is made of sheet metal and has the turret has five faces, each with a double-hung window, and is capped with a bell-shaped hip roof.

== Gallery ==
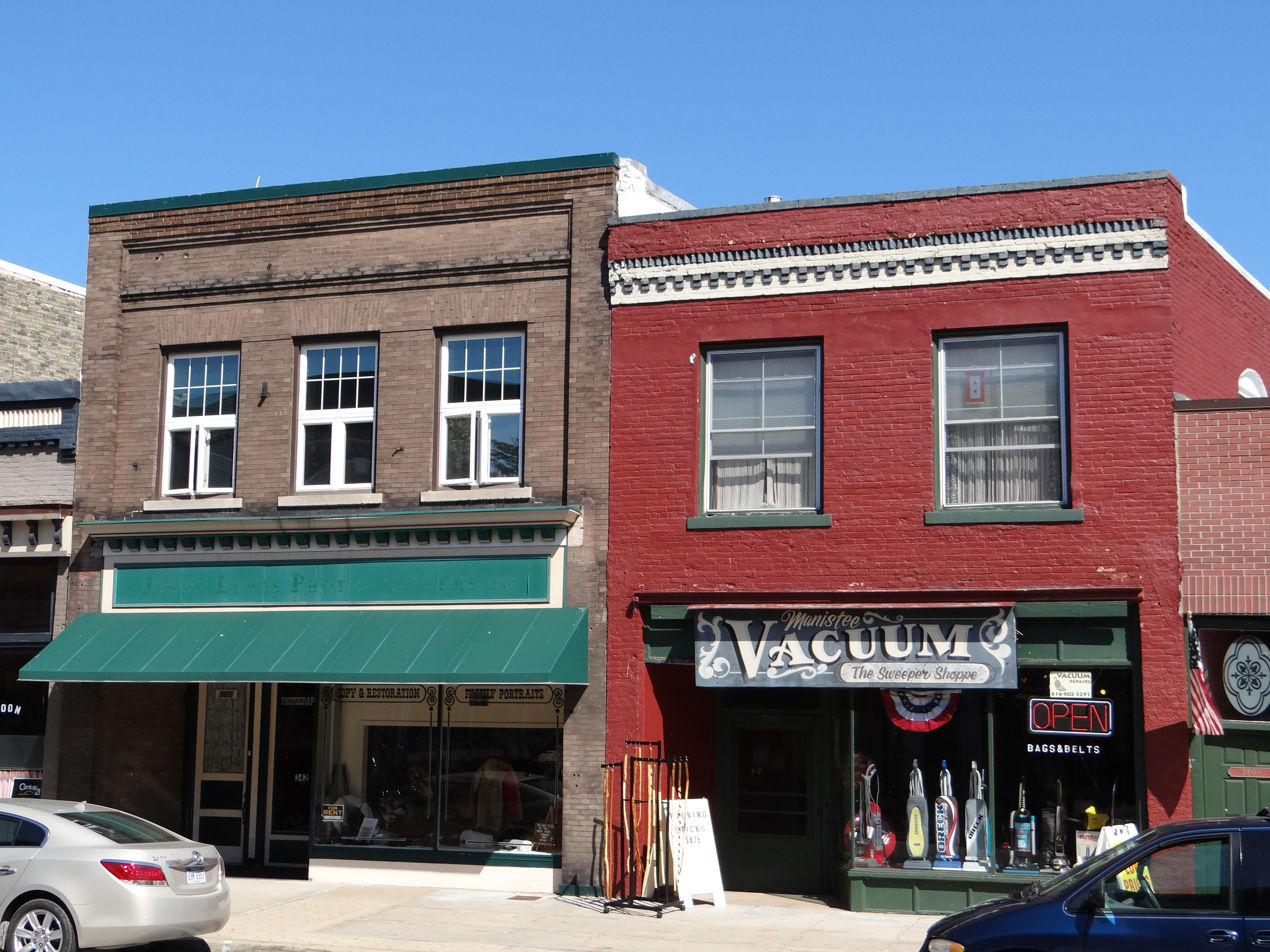
340 and 342 River Street

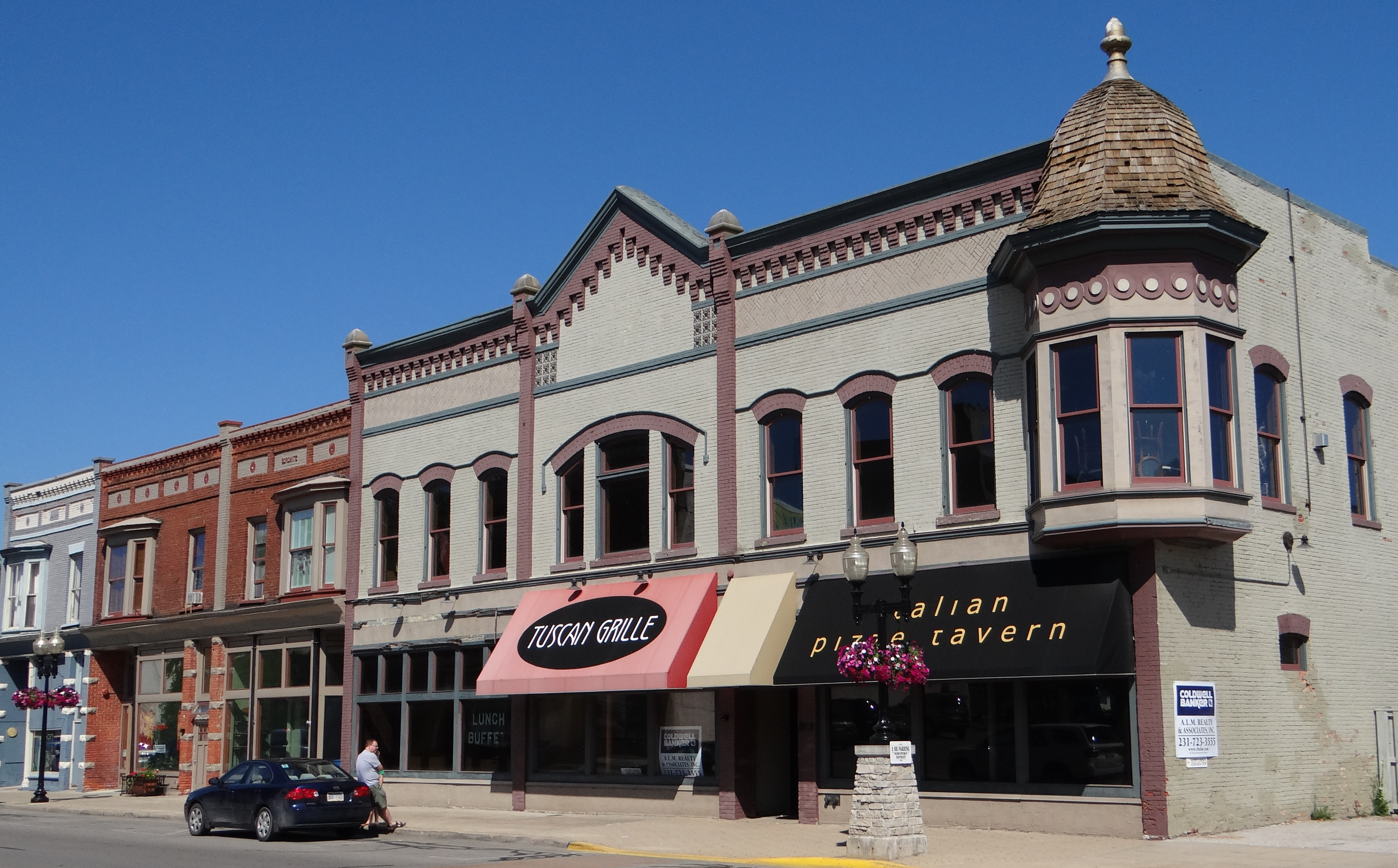
River Street

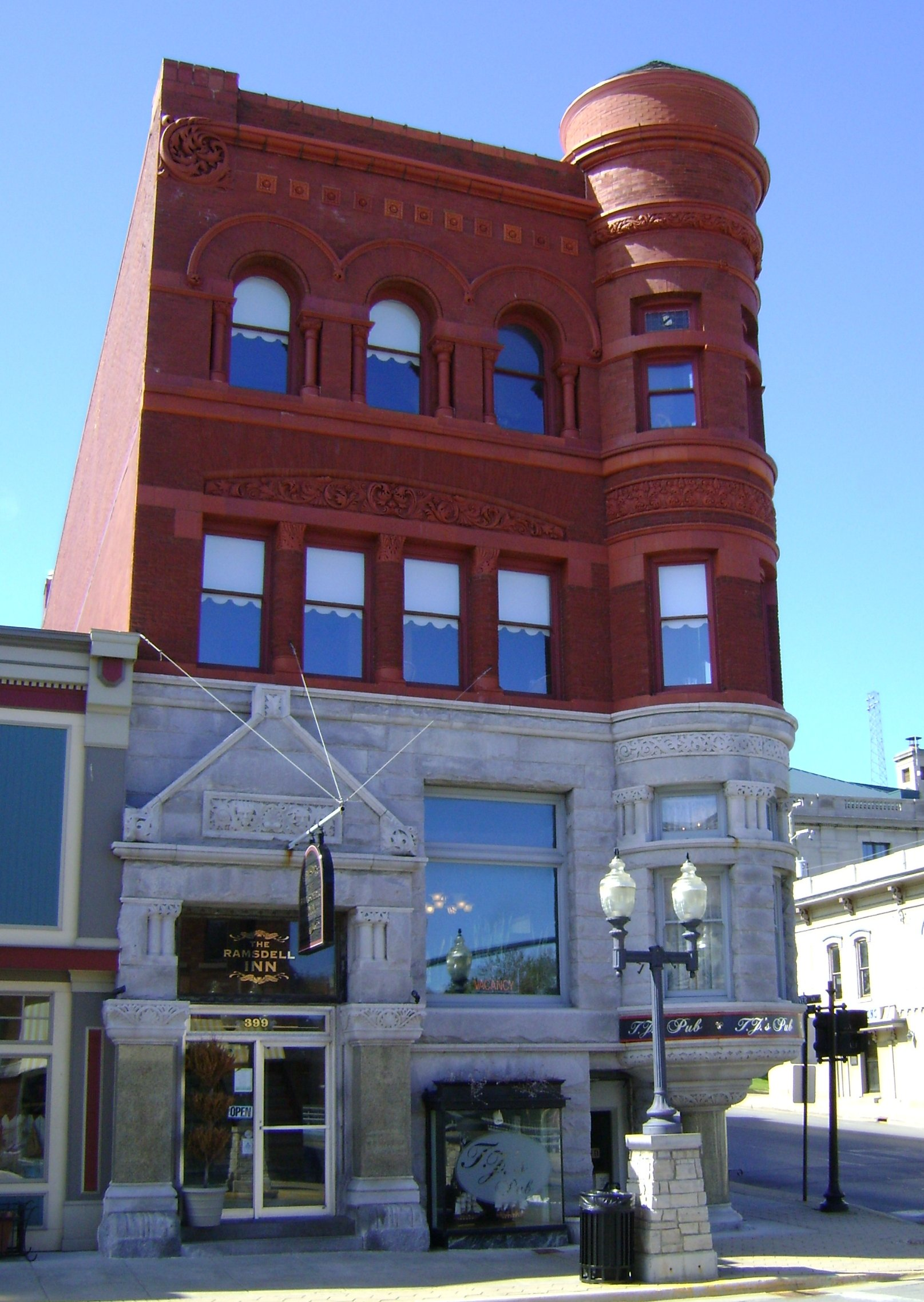
Ramsdell building at River and Maple
