= John M. Stowell =

American politician

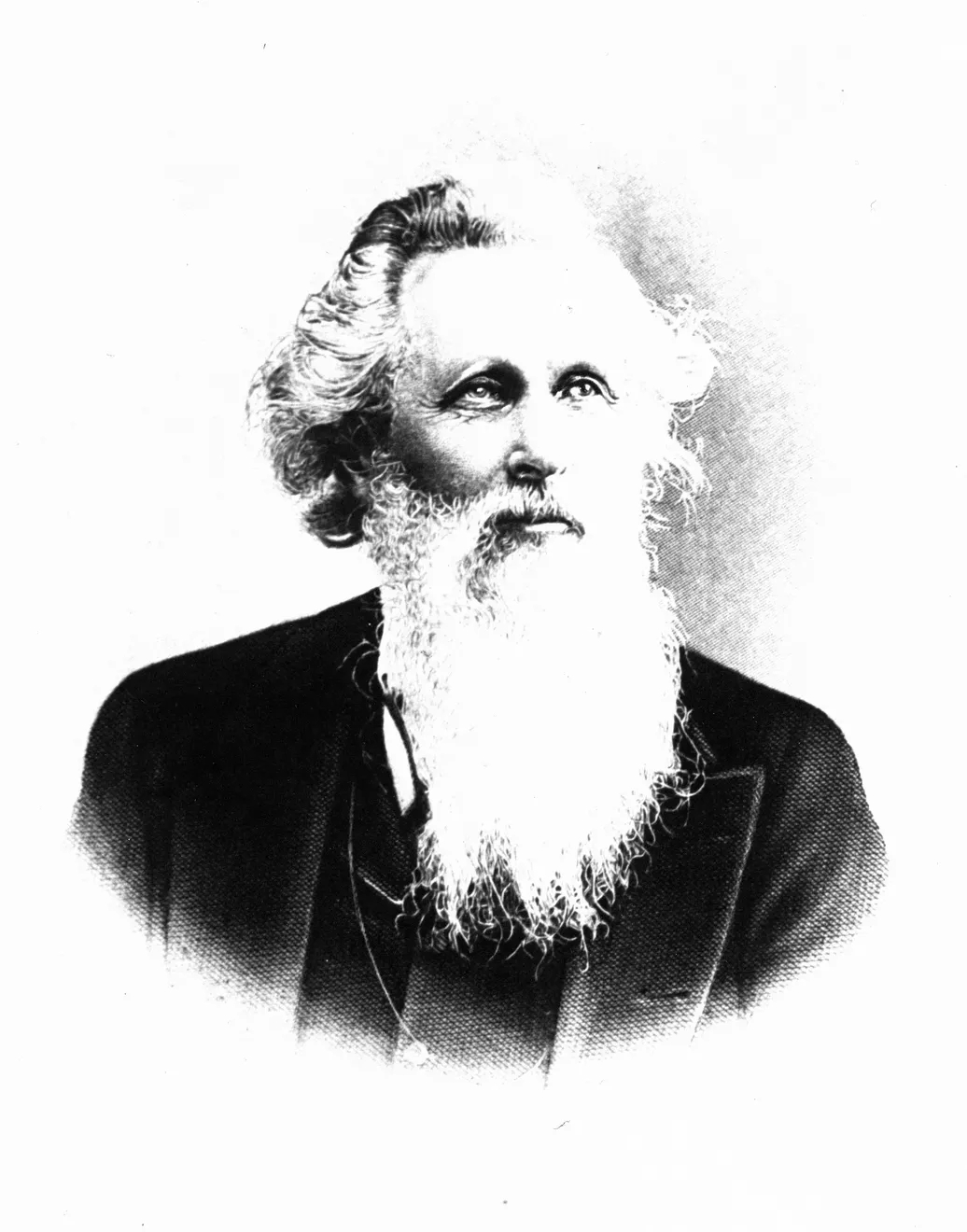
Stowell c. 1882–1884

John Maxwell Stowell (1824–1907) was an American manufacturer and politician in Wisconsin. He served as the 26th Mayor of Milwaukee.

== Early life ==
Stowell was born in Alexander, New York in 1824. He attended Alexander Classical School and Marietta College before moving to Milwaukee, Wisconsin in 1856.

== Business career ==
Arriving in Milwaukee, Stowell opened a small machine shop. In 1867, with Delos L. Filer, he established the Cream City Iron Works. The business expanded, and in 1880 it was incorporated as Filer and Stowell Co., manufacturers of sawmill machinery. Stowell was president of this firm until his death, and was also president and co-founder (1895), with Charles I. Sammond, of the Stowell Manufacturing and Foundry Co. of South Milwaukee.

== Political career ==
Stowell was a member of the Wisconsin State Assembly in 1862 before serving as Mayor of Milwaukee from 1882 to 1884. He was a Democrat.

He died in 1907 in Milwaukee and is interred in Forest Home Cemetery in Milwaukee.
