= Stronach, Michigan =

- Census-designated place (CDP) & unincorporated community
- Location within Michigan Location within the United States
- Coordinates: 44°12′48″N 86°16′31″W
- Country: United States
- State: Michigan
- County: Manistee
- Township: Stronach

Area
  - Total: 0.35 sq mi (0.90 km^{2})
  - Land: 0.35 sq mi (0.90 km^{2})
  - Water: 0 sq mi (0.00 km^{2})
- Elevation: 604 ft (184 m)

Population (2020)
  - Total: 170
  - Density: 488.2/sq mi (188.48/km^{2})
- Time zone: UTC-5 (Eastern (EST))
  - Summer (DST): UTC-4 (EDT)
- ZIP Code: 49660 (Manistee)
- Area code: 231
- GNIS feature ID: 1621796
- FIPS code: 26-76820

Stronach is an unincorporated community and census-designated place (CDP) in Stronach Township, Manistee County, Michigan, United States. Its population was 170 as of the 2020 census. The community is located at the southeast end of Manistee Lake.

== History ==
Stronach was first called "Paggeotville" and was renamed when John and Adam Stronach built a sawmill in 1841. A post office opened August 9, 1866, and was discontinued on December 21, 1893. Other sources indicate the post office operated until March 31, 1954, or until December 21, 1983. The area is now served by the Manistee post office with ZIP code 49660.

== Geography ==
Stronach is in southwestern Manistee County, in the western part of Stronach Township. The Little Manistee River runs along the southern edge of the community and flows into Manistee Lake, which is on the western edge of the community.

According to the U.S. Census Bureau, the Stronach CDP has an area of 0.348 square miles (0.90 km^{2}), all of it land.

== Demographics ==
Historical population
Census	Pop.	Note	%±
2010	162		—
2020	170		4.9%
U.S. Decennial Census
