= Filer and Stowell =

Manufacturing company

- Industry: Manufacturing
- Founded: 1856
- Founder: Delos Filer; John Stowell
- Headquarters: Milwaukee, Wisconsin
- Area served: United States

Filer and Stowell is a company based in Milwaukee, Wisconsin in the United States of America. Founded by Delos Filer and John M. Stowell in 1856, the company has produced equipment primarily for the lumber industry, largely for lumber mills but also in the past stationary steam engines, marine steam engines and even steam locomotives for logging lines.

== Locomotives ==
Filer and Stowell produced a line of steam locomotives from the 1880s for the logging industry. They were simply constructed, tough and easy to maintain, and employed oscillating cylinders, an extreme rarity in locomotive practice. "A large number" were produced, mostly for customers in the southern and south-eastern United States.

== Stationary steam engines ==
Filer and Stowell produced large Corliss engines, both simple and compound, originally for lumber mill power but also for other applications.

== Shipping ==
Filer and Stowell produced marine steam engines for a number of years, and were one of fourteen engine manufacturers to produce the triple expansion steam engines for the World War II Liberty ships.
