= Filer Charter Township, Michigan =

- Charter township
- Location within Michigan Location within the United States
- Coordinates: 44°13′7″N 86°18′24″W
- Country: United States
- State: Michigan
- County: Manistee

Area
  - Total: 16.14 sq mi (41.8 km^{2})
  - Land: 15.75 sq mi (40.8 km^{2})
  - Water: 0.39 sq mi (1.0 km^{2})
- Elevation: 643 ft (196 m)

Population (2020)
  - Total: 2,318
  - Density: 147.1/sq mi (56.8/km^{2})
- Time zone: UTC-5 (Eastern (EST))
  - Summer (DST): UTC-4 (EDT)
- FIPS code: 26-101-28040
- GNIS feature ID: 1626282
- Website: filertwpmi.gov

Filer Charter Township is a charter township of Manistee County in the U.S. state of Michigan. The population was 2,318 at the 2020 census.

== Communities ==
- Filer City is an unincorporated community and post office within the township at 44°12′55″N 86°17′14″W just south of the city of Manistee on the south shore of Manistee Lake. The Filer City post office opened March 10, 1868. It was discontinued on April 12, 1871, and reestablished on July 13, 1883.
- Oak Hill is an unincorporated community and census-designated place in the northeastern part of the township, bordered to the east by Filer City, to the north by Manistee, to the northeast by Manistee Lake, and to the west by U.S. Route 31.

== Geography ==
The township is in southwestern Manistee County, bordered to the south by Mason County and to the west by Lake Michigan. The city of Manistee borders the township to the north, and Stronach Township is to the east.

According to the United States Census Bureau, Filer Charter Township has a total area of 16.1 square miles (42 km^{2}), of which 0.4 square miles (1.0 km^{2}), or 2.40%, are water.

== Demographics ==
As of the census of 2000, there were 2,208 people, 886 households, and 676 families residing in the township. The population density was 139.5 inhabitants per square mile (53.9/km^{2}). There were 996 housing units at an average density of 62.9 per square mile (24.3/km^{2}). The racial makeup of the township was 96.78% White, 0.23% African American, 0.63% Native American, 0.36% Asian, 0.54% from other races, and 1.45% from two or more races. Hispanic or Latino of any race were 1.68% of the population.

There were 886 households, out of which 28.2% had children under the age of 18 living with them, 66.4% were married couples living together, 6.8% had a female householder with no husband present, and 23.7% were non-families. 20.9% of all households were made up of individuals, and 12.0% had someone living alone who was 65 years of age or older. The average household size was 2.49 and the average family size was 2.87.

In the township the population was spread out, with 22.8% under the age of 18, 5.3% from 18 to 24, 23.3% from 25 to 44, 29.2% from 45 to 64, and 19.4% who were 65 years of age or older. The median age was 44 years. For every 100 females, there were 100.7 males. For every 100 females age 18 and over, there were 97.5 males.

The median income for a household in the township was $40,972, and the median income for a family was $45,417. Males had a median income of $36,333 versus $23,065 for females. The per capita income for the township was $19,811. 7.2% of the population and 4.3% of families were below the poverty line. Out of the total people living in poverty, 8.6% are under the age of 18 and 6.5% are 65 or older.
