= Thomas Jefferson Ramsdell =

American lawyer and entrepreneur

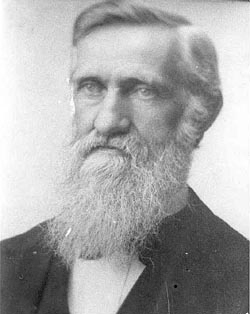
- 1904
- Born: July 19, 1832; Plymouth, Michigan
- Died: 22 April 1917 (aged 84); Manistee, Michigan
- Resting place: Oak Grove Cemetery in Manistee, Michigan
- Occupation: Lawyer

Signature
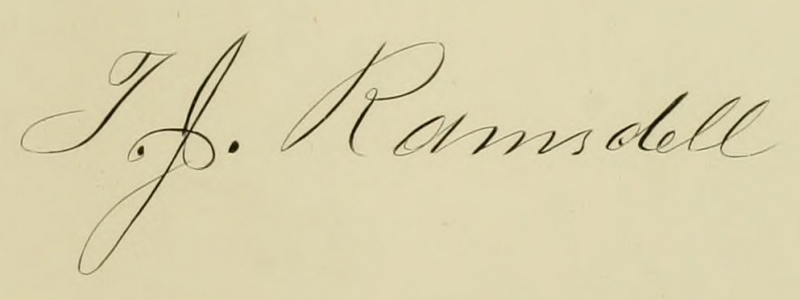

Thomas Jefferson Ramsdell (1833–1917) was an entrepreneur from Manistee, Michigan. He served as the town's first and only attorney in the later part of the nineteenth century. He was a Michigan State Representative for one term; he also served several terms as prosecuting attorney for Manistee County, and one term as county treasurer.

Ramsdell developed several of the town's commercial enterprises, including a hardware store, the town's first downtown river bridge, the town's first newspaper, the town's first school house, the Ramsdell building, the Ramsdell Theatre, the First National Bank, the Manistee Water Works, and several commercial blocks in downtown Manistee.

== Early life ==
Ramsdell was born on a farm in Wayne County, Michigan, near the village of Plymouth on July 29, 1833. He is of Scottish descent; his parents came from Massachusetts after immigrating to the United States from Scotland twenty years earlier. Ramsdell had three other brothers: J.G. Ramsdell, a judge in Traverse City, Michigan, and two who were farmers, D. E. Ramsdell and W. A. Ramsdell. As a boy, he divided his time between working on his father's farm in the summers and attending school in the winter.

Ramsdell attended Plymouth Seminary in 1851. He taught school in between terms, and graduated from the Seminary in 1856. His true interest was always in the legal profession. One year he was introduced to John W. Longyear, and spent this time learning law from him. He then went on to the National Law School of Poughkeepsie, New York, graduating in 1858. While he obtained a license to practice law in New York, he immediately returned to Michigan, where he was admitted to the bar in Ingham County. In Lansing, Michigan's capital located in Ingham County, he found his first job as a clerk for the Michigan Supreme Court in 1859. It was here that he met Chief Justice George Martin, who suggested the lumber town of Manistee as a place to start a law profession.

== Life in Manistee ==
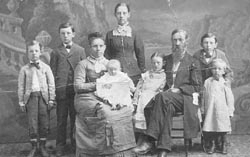
Thomas Ramsdell family

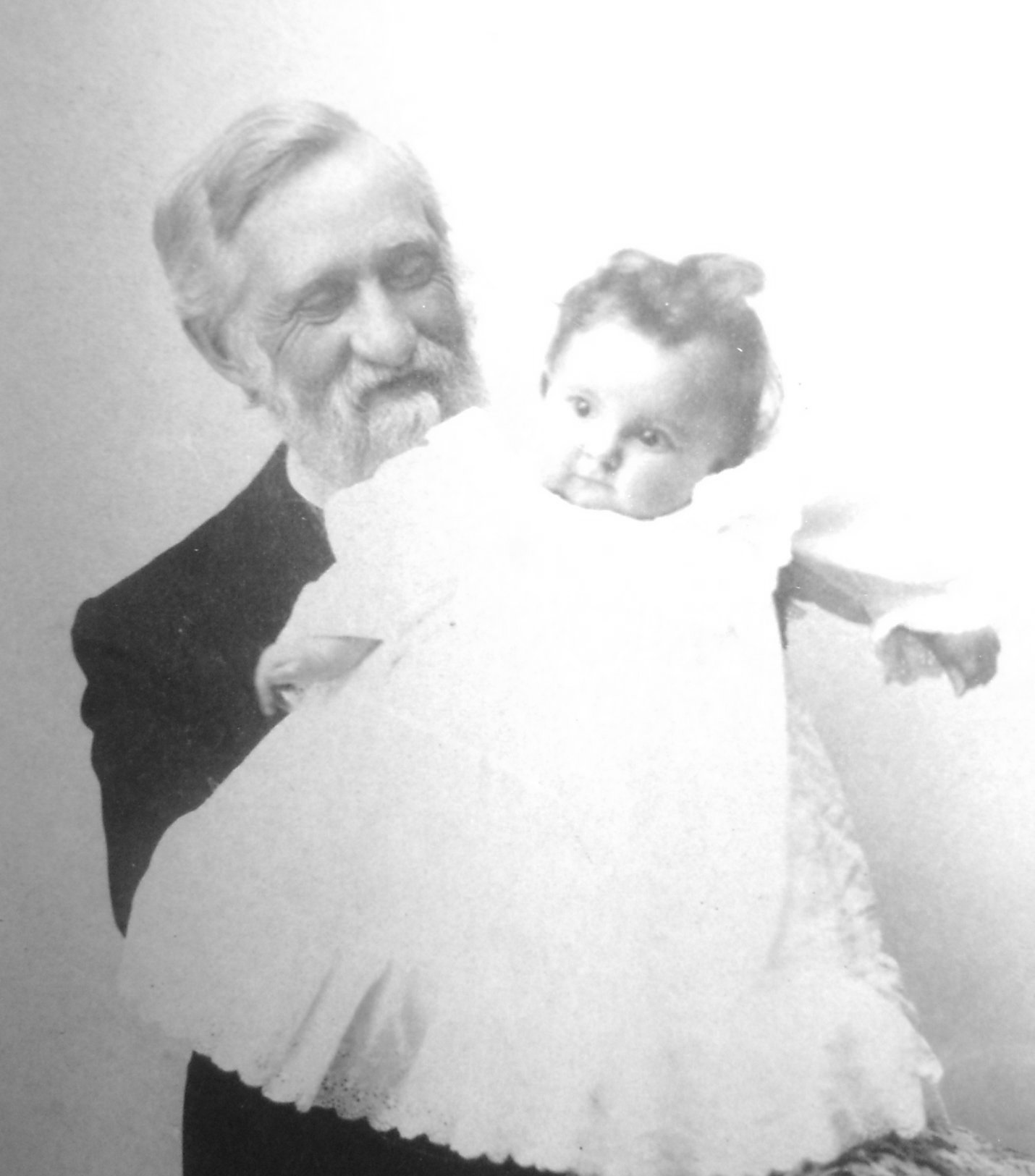
"TJ" with a granddaughter

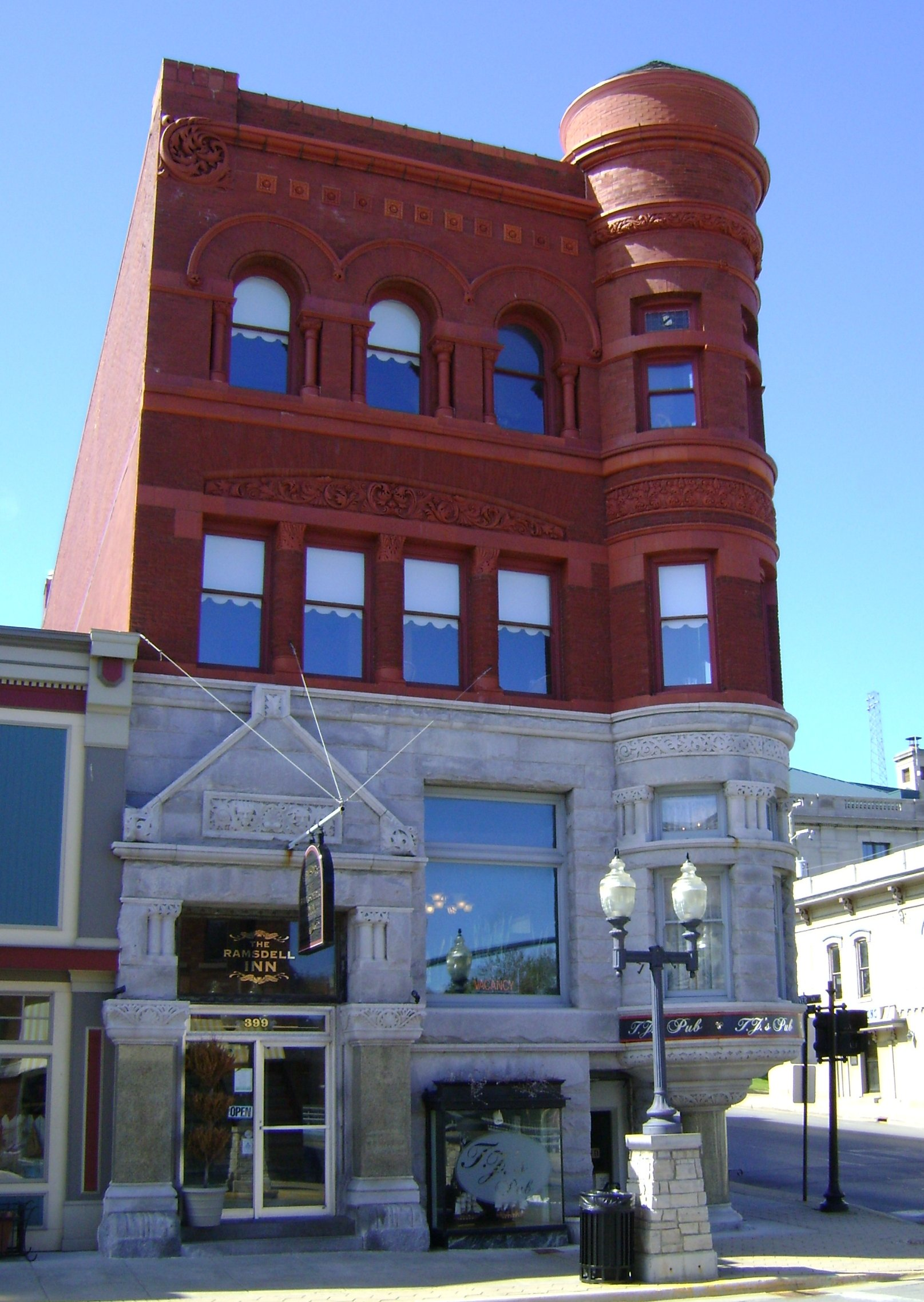
Ramsdell building

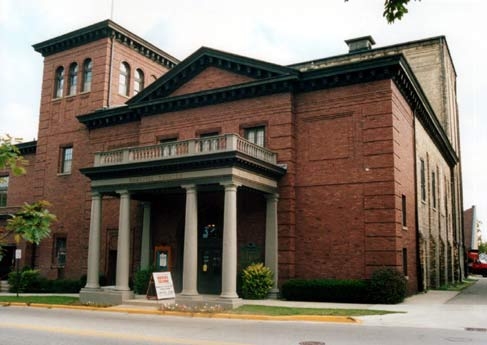
Ramsdell Theatre

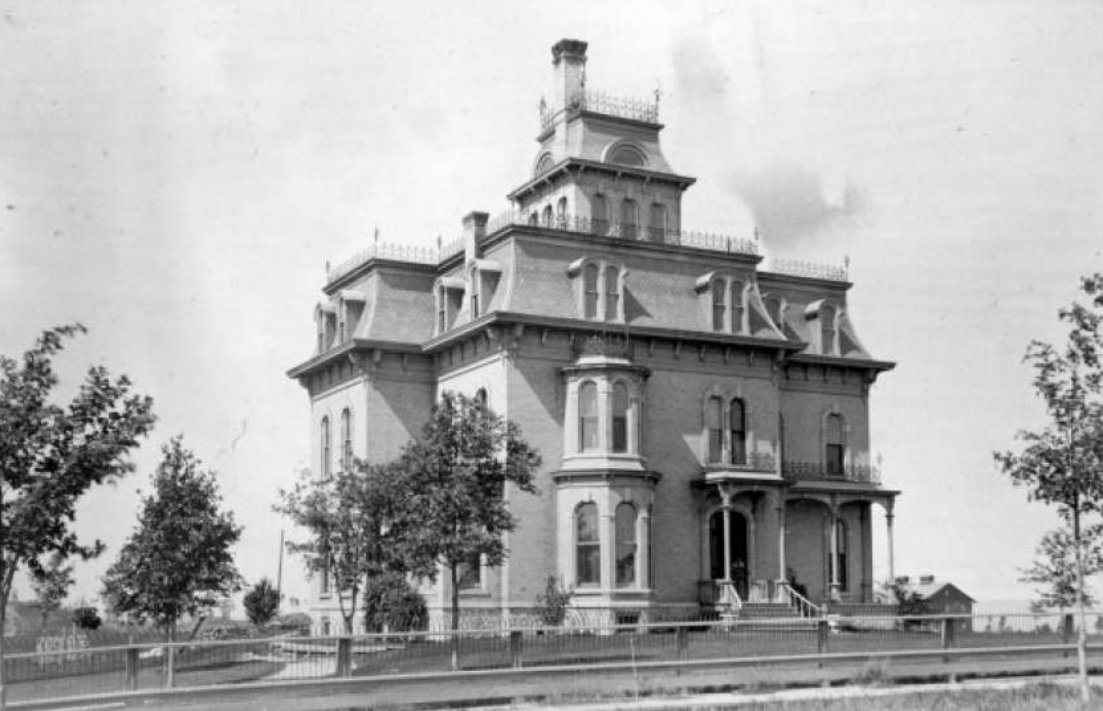
T. J. Ramsdell residence, circa. 1910

With a collection of legal books selected for him by Justice Martin, Ramsdell set out for Manistee with a horse and a small one-seat sleigh in the winter of 1860. Manistee was then a very remote town, which had "hitherto known neither law nor lawyer". It took Ramsdell a week to make the journey to Manistee from Muskegon, Michigan; there were no roads going there north from Whitehall, only a blaze trail, which made for a tedious journey. At times, his horse would give out, and they would have to stop and rest. One time, he traveled for an entire night and progressed only 5 miles (8 km) toward Manistee.

Manistee was a wild, lawless frontier. History records that lumbermen wrote their own contracts, resulting in numerous legal problems from omitting items that should have been in the documents. There were accounts of men walking all the way to Traverse City—over 50 miles (80 km)—just to get a document that would get them out of the Manistee County jail. Ramsdell was welcomed by the entire whiskey-drinking community, which treated him with great respect. Because of the reverence they had for him, he was never asked to drink with them. He rode the law circuit with Judge Littlejohn and was known as the father of the circuit. Ramsdell pursued many projects in the 1860s in addition to his law practice in Manistee. In November 1860 he was elected to the Michigan State House of Representatives in which he served a single two-year term. Ramsdell was also a member of the Manistee school board for eighteen years. In addition to these ventures he served as the Manistee County Treasurer and as well for several terms being the county Prosecuting Attorney.

== Investments ==
=== First Manistee bridge ===
Until 1866, there was no bridge across the river in downtown Manistee. That made it necessary for anyone who wanted to cross to hire a boat and boatman. Ramsdell, along with several of the local lumbermen of the Manistee area, formed a private corporation which built a wooden turn bridge at the Maple Street crossing. Tolls were charged allowing the investors a return on their money. The wooden bridge was destroyed in the Great Michigan Fire of 1871.

=== Community involvement ===
In 1867, Ramsdell joined in partnership with E. E. Benedict. Ramsdell and Benedict was a prominent law firm in Manistee, and won most of its cases. This partnership continued until the retirement of both parties from active law practice in 1897. Ramsdell opened the first Manistee hardware store and helped produce the first local newspaper. He also founded the First National Bank in Manistee along with others. Ramsdell developed and founded the Manistee Water Works utility. He was also the contractor for the original school house on the corner of Oak and First Street.

=== Commercial property ===
Around 1879, Ramsdell began investing in commercial real estate. He reportedly made his first investment in real estate by trading his horse and cutter to a local Manistee person by the name of Delos L. Filer. He traded these objects for 40 acres (160,000 m^{2}) in the southwest part of Manistee.

Ramsdell invested in many commercial blocks of downtown Manistee, and his own residence was located there. His first major commercial construction project was a large building on the southeast corner of River and Maple Street, known as the Ramsdell Building. A red brick structure with terra cotta accents in the Victorian style, the Ramsdell Building was constructed from 1891 to 1892, and was home to the First National Bank. He also built the commercial block at River Street and Oak Street, as well as the adjacent block.

=== Ramsdell Theater ===
Over the years, many public places in Manistee were used for entertainment of the local people. In 1883, the Scandinavian Society built a theater at First and Greenbush streets; on December 17, 1900, however, it burned down. The Manistee Daily News, on November 22 of the following year, spoke of the need for a new theater, and lack of entertainment because of the previous year's events. It suggested temporary arrangements until a permanent structure could be built. Eleven days later, Ramsdell announced that he would build a new opera house at First Street and Maple Street. Construction took two years, and the Ramsdell Theatre was finally finished in 1903. It still serves western northern Michigan today as a monument to one of Manistee's pioneers. In this theater, James Earl Jones (then known as Todd Jones) began his theatrical career.

=== Personal residence ===
Ramsdell's residence was constructed in 1875, at the corner of Eighth Street and Cedar Street. It was on a 60-foot (18 m) wide street fronting east. In 1929, it was "gutted" by a fire which burned for 13 hours, causing an estimated $75,000 (equivalent to $1.41 million in 2025) of damage.

The main structure was 40 by 69 feet (12 by 21 m), with a five-room wing of 22 by 34 feet (6.7 by 10.4 m), and a cellar under the main building. The entrance was from the east, through a vestibule laid with tile stone of various colors. On the northeast side of the vestibule was a veranda. From the vestibule, guests entered a 12-by-32-foot (3.7 by 9.8 m) hall, with a winding staircase that went up to the next floor level. On the north side of the hall was parlor with a bay window. South of the hall was a library. Adjoining the library was the master bedroom; from the master bedroom bathroom was connected a conservatory.

The second story contained a sitting room and five additional bedrooms. From the second story, another winding staircase led to the third story, which had a ballroom, a room with lounge furniture, and a Centennial room. The ballroom was square, 40 feet (12 m) on each side, and used as a social center. From the third story was a staircase to a tower, twelve feet on each side and two stories high. From the tower could be seen a wide view of the downtown district of Manistee. The house was built of pressed Milwaukee brick, and had a mansard roof. Ramsdell's residence was lit with gas.

== Personal life ==
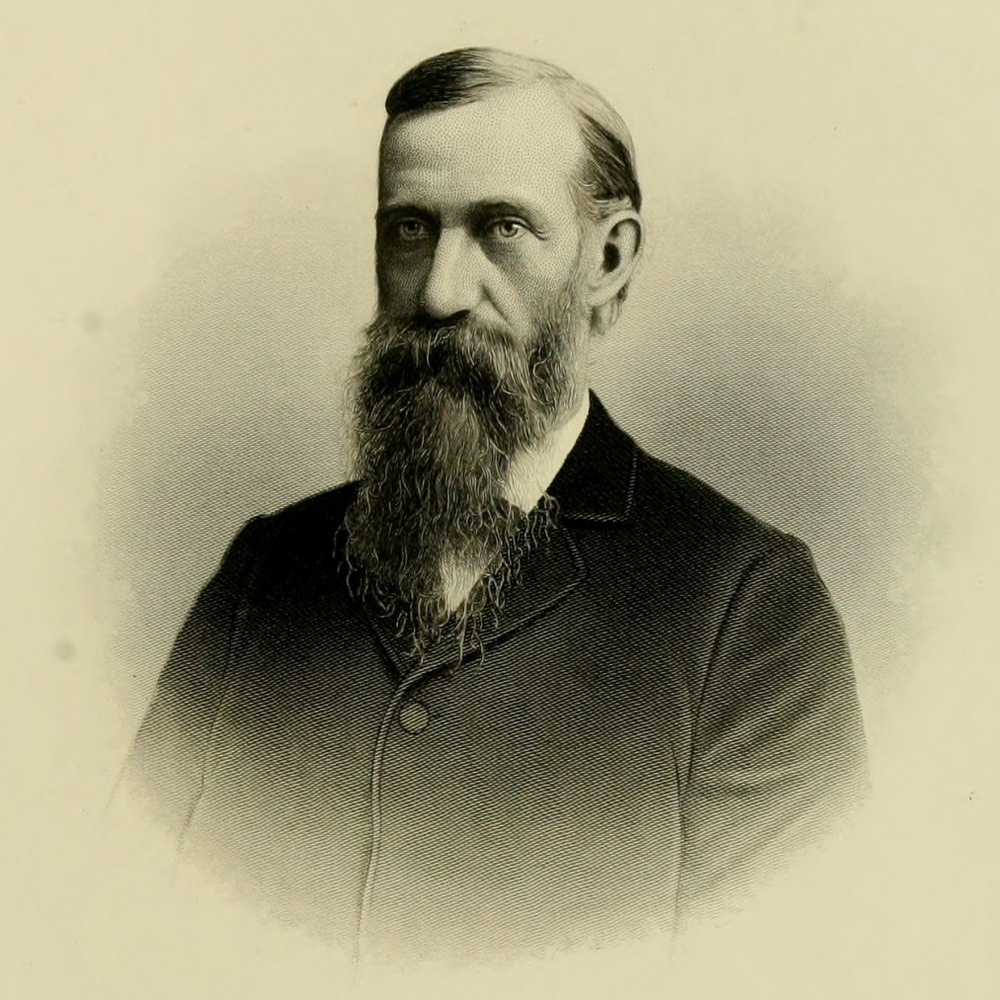
Ramsdell in an 1890 engraving

While not a Kentucky Colonel himself, Ramsdell was described as having the personality of one; tall, genial, and distinguished-looking, interested in thoroughbred horses and dancing. He married a Manistee school teacher named Nettie Stanton on September 7, 1861. They had twelve children, six boys and six girls. Many of these children grew up to become famous in their own right, including the artist Frederick Winthrop Ramsdell and Winnogene Scott. After years of gradually declining health, he died on April 22, 1917. The Manistee News Advocate said: "A staunch upholder of faith in Manistee throughout a longer period of time than probably any other citizen of prominence, Mr. Ramsdell’s name is indissolubly linked with the history of this community for all time". He is buried in the Oak Grove Cemetery at Manistee.

== Sources ==
- Page, H. R. (1882). History of Manistee County, Mason County and Oceana county, Michigan Collection. Chicago, Illinois: H. R. Page.
