= M111 =

M111 may refer to:

- M-111 (Michigan highway), two former state highways
- HMS Blyth (M111), a British Royal Navy Sandown-class minehunter
- Mercedes-Benz M111 engine, an automobile engine
- CWS M111, a Polish 1930s motorcycle
- M111, a US Army offensive hand grenade
