= Filer City, Michigan =

- Census-designated place (CDP) & unincorporated community
- Location within Michigan Location within the United States
- Coordinates: 44°12′55″N 86°17′14″W
- Country: United States
- State: Michigan
- County: Manistee
- Township: Filer

Area
  - Total: 0.25 sq mi (0.65 km^{2})
  - Land: 0.25 sq mi (0.65 km^{2})
  - Water: 0.00 sq mi (0 km^{2})
- Elevation: 607 ft (185 m)

Population (2020)
  - Total: 136
  - Density: 524.5/sq mi (202.52/km^{2})
- Time zone: UTC-5 (Eastern (EST))
  - Summer (DST): UTC-4 (EDT)
- ZIP code: 49634
- Area code: 231
- GNIS feature ID: 1619908
- FIPS Code: 26-28060

Filer City is an unincorporated community and census-designated place in Filer Charter Township, Manistee County, Michigan, United States. Its population was 136 as of the 2020 census. The community is located on Manistee Lake just south of Manistee. Filer City has a post office with ZIP code 49634. The post office opened March 10, 1868, was discontinued on April 12, 1871, and reopened on July 13, 1883.

== Geography ==
Filer City is in southwestern Manistee County, in the northeast part of Filer Charter Township. It is bordered to the west by the community of Oak Hill and to the north and east by Manistee Lake. The community of Stronach is across the lake to the east.

According to the U.S. Census Bureau, Filer City has an area of 0.25 square miles (0.65 km^{2}), all of it land.

== Demographics ==
Historical population
Census	Pop.	Note	%±
2010	116		—
2020	136		17.2%
U.S. Decennial Census
