= WMTE =

WMTE can refer to:

- WMTE-FM, a radio station (101.5 FM) licensed to Manistee, Michigan, United States
- WMTE (AM), a defunct radio station (1340 AM) formerly licensed to Manistee, Michigan
