= Oak Hill, Michigan =

- Census-designated place (CDP) & unincorporated community
- Location within Michigan Location within the United States
- Coordinates: 44°13′28″N 86°18′14″W
- Country: United States
- State: Michigan
- County: Manistee
- Township: Filer

Area
  - Total: 0.50 sq mi (1.30 km^{2})
  - Land: 0.50 sq mi (1.30 km^{2})
  - Water: 0 sq mi (0.00 km^{2})
- Elevation: 656 ft (200 m)

Population (2020)
  - Total: 545
  - Density: 1,084.1/sq mi (418.57/km^{2})
- Time zone: UTC-5 (Eastern (EST))
  - Summer (DST): UTC-4 (EDT)
- ZIP Code: 49660 (Manistee)
- Area code: 231
- GNIS feature ID: 1621085
- FIPS Code: 26-59740

Oak Hill is an unincorporated community and census-designated place in Manistee County, Michigan, United States. Its population was 545 as of the 2020 census.

== Geography ==
The community is in southwestern Manistee County, in the northeast part of Filer Charter Township. It is bordered to the east by the unincorporated community of Filer City and to the north by the city of Manistee. The northeast side of Oak Hill is bordered by Manistee Lake. U.S. Route 31 follows the western edge of the community, leading north into Manistee and south 25 miles (40 km) to Ludington.

According to the U.S. Census Bureau, the Oak Hill CDP has an area of 0.503 square miles (1.30 km^{2}), all land.

== Demographics ==
Historical population
Census	Pop.	Note	%±
2010	569		—
2020	545		−4.2%
U.S. Decennial Census
