= Eastlake, Michigan =

- Village
- Location of Eastlake, Michigan
- Coordinates: 44°14′44″N 86°17′38″W
- Country: United States
- State: Michigan
- County: Manistee
- Township: Manistee
- Incorporated: 1912

Area
  - Total: 1.46 sq mi (3.77 km^{2})
  - Land: 1.20 sq mi (3.10 km^{2})
  - Water: 0.26 sq mi (0.67 km^{2})

Population (2020)
  - Total: 415
  - Density: 346.4/sq mi (133.74/km^{2})
- Time zone: UTC-5 (Eastern (EST))
  - Summer (DST): UTC-4 (EDT)
- ZIP code: 49626
- Area code: 231
- FIPS code: 26-24060

Eastlake is a village in the U.S. state of Michigan. The population was 415 at the 2020 census. Located within Manistee County, the village sits across Manistee Lake from the city of Manistee.

Eastlake was incorporated as a village in 1912.

== Geography ==
Eastlake is in southwestern Manistee County, in the southwest corner of Manistee Township. It is bordered to the west by the city of Manistee and to the south by Stronach Township. To the north is the valley of the Manistee River. Highway M-55 crosses the northeast corner of the village, leading east 47 miles (76 km) to Cadillac northwest 1 mile (1.6 km) to U.S. Route 31 in Parkdale, providing road access to the city of Manistee.

According to the United States Census Bureau, the village of Eastlake has a total area of 1.46 square miles (3.78 km^{2}), of which 1.20 square miles (3.11 km^{2}) are land and 0.26 square miles (0.67 km^{2}), or 17.72%, are water.

== Climate ==
This climatic region is typified by large seasonal temperature differences, with warm to hot (and often humid) summers and cold (sometimes severely cold) winters. According to the Köppen Climate Classification system, Eastlake has a humid continental climate, abbreviated "Dfb" on climate maps.

== Demographics ==
Historical population
Census	Pop.	Note	%±
1890	1,856		—
1920	675		—
1930	392		−41.9%
1940	412		5.1%
1950	376		−8.7%
1960	436		16.0%
1970	512		17.4%
1980	514		0.4%
1990	473		−8.0%
2000	441		−6.8%
2010	512		16.1%
2020	415		−18.9%
U.S. Decennial Census

The median income (census 2000) for a household in the village was $131,750, and the median income for a family was $135,417. Males had a median income of $131,250 versus $120,000 for females. The per capita income for the village was $115,034. About 1.6% of families and 3.4% of the population were below the poverty line, including none of those under age 18 and 9.4% of those age 65 or over.

=== 2010 census ===
As of the census of 2010, there were 512 people, 231 households, and 147 families residing in the village. The population density was 437.6 inhabitants per square mile (169.0/km^{2}). There were 266 housing units at an average density of 227.4 per square mile (87.8/km^{2}). The racial makeup of the village was 89.8% White, 0.6% African American, 3.1% Native American, 0.2% Asian, 0.6% from other races, and 5.7% from two or more races. Hispanic or Latino of any race were 2.9% of the population.

There were 231 households, of which 24.2% had children under the age of 18 living with them, 44.6% were married couples living together, 12.6% had a female householder with no husband present, 6.5% had a male householder with no wife present, and 36.4% were non-families. 30.7% of all households were made up of individuals, and 14.3% had someone living alone who was 65 years of age or older. The average household size was 2.22 and the average family size was 2.65.

The median age in the village was 46.8 years. 19.1% of residents were under the age of 18; 5.2% were between the ages of 18 and 24; 23.1% were from 25 to 44; 30.6% were from 45 to 64; and 22.1% were 65 years of age or older. The gender makeup of the village was 47.9% male and 52.1% female.
