= Catholic Central High School (Manistee, Michigan) =

Manistee Catholic Central School

Location
- 1200 U.S. 31 South; Manistee, (Manistee County), Michigan 49660; United States; 44°13′51″N 86°18′46″W

Information
- Type: Private, Coeducational
- Motto: Christ Centered Excellence in Education
- Religious affiliation: Roman Catholic
- Established: 1964
- Principal: Leslie Summers
- Grades: PK–12
- Colors: Red and White and Blue
- Fight song: Flashing Sabers
- Mascot: Sabers
- Team name: Sabers
- Accreditation: Michigan Association of Non-Public Schools
- Website: www.sabers.org

Manistee Catholic Central School was a private, Roman Catholic school in Manistee, Michigan. It was operated by the Roman Catholic Diocese of Gaylord.

== History ==
Manistee Catholic Central Schools was established in 1964 through the consolidation of several local parish schools. On the 21st of March 2024, Bishop Jeffrey Walsh announced a need for an additional 2 million dollars in order to fund the next school year. A deadline of April 8 was set but the funding fell short. On April 9 Bishop Walsh announced the school would close with the 2024 school year. As of now the property is still owned by the local parish.

== Sports ==
Catholic Central had a variety of sports including football, volleyball, cheerleading, basketball, softball, track and field, bowling and golf, co-op ski.
