= Delos L. Filer =

American who developed Ludington, Michigan

Delos L Filer
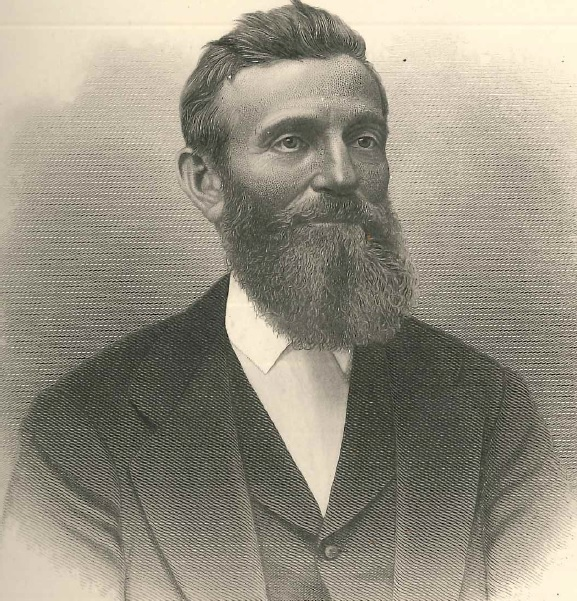
- c. 1869
- Born: September 17, 1817; Herkimer County, New York
- Died: July 26, 1879 (aged 61); Mason County, Michigan
- Resting place: Forest Home Cemetery in Milwaukee, Wisconsin, US
- Education: public schools
- Occupations: businessman, lumberman
- Known for: developing Mason County and Ludington, Michigan
- Spouse(s): S.A. Paine (m.1838 – 1839); Juliet Golden (m. 1840 – 1864); Mary M. Pierce (m.1866 – 1879)
- Children: five

Delos L. Filer (September 17, 1817–July 26, 1879) was a businessman involved in developing Manistee County and the towns of Manistee, Filer City and Ludington in the state of Michigan. He owned sawmills and related businesses.

== Biography ==
=== Early life and education ===
Filer was of Scottish ancestry and born in Herkimer County in the state of New York on September 17, 1817. He attended local public schools for his initial training. Because of his scholastic interests he became a teacher in the New York District School system soon after graduating from high school.

=== Mid life ===
Filer was also a farmer and businessman early in his adult life. He was interested in the lumber industry and merchandising. He left New York in 1849 when his family moved to Racine, Wisconsin. There, he became a traveling salesman selling cigars and tobacco. His merchandising territory was Wisconsin and Illinois. Filer was in this occupation for four years and then came to Manistee, Michigan, in the fall of 1853. He became bookkeeper for the accounting firm E. & J. Canfield earning $400 (equivalent to $12,400 in 2020) per year, after having been previously employed with the Canfields in Racine. To supplement his income for his family of four children, he used basic knowledge of medicine to help the sick.

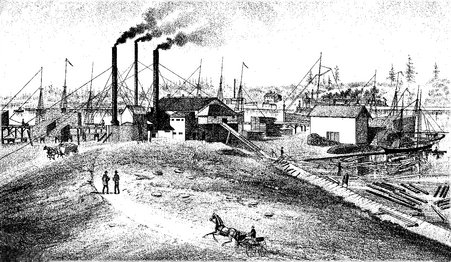
Filer & Sons Mill in 1882

Filer saved up enough money by 1858 to buy property. First he bought some land containing timber and then a half-interest in the Batchelder mill property that included a sawmill. He was successful in operating his half of the sawmill business and eventually bought out the other half-interest. Success in operating the Batchelder mill he owned outright gave him the opportunity to buy additional surrounding land containing timber. Filer then bought the McVickar estate in 1862. Together with the Batchelder mill, that brought Filer's land to the equivalent of two-thirds of what is today Manistee.

In 1866, Filer established D. L. Filer & Sons in 1866 with his sons Delos W. Filer and E. Golden Filer; he also purchased 2,500 acres (1,000 ha) at the south end of Manistee Lake where they built a sawmill. Another part of that acreage became Filer City, a suburb of Manistee.

The management of the sawmill firm was done mostly by Filer's sons. According to Lumberman (1905), the "mill was improved until it produced 100,000 feet of lumber, 250,000 wood shingles, and 50,000 wooden lath slats daily". The Filer & Sons lumber mill ran out of timber and went out of business in 1914.

=== Marriage ===
Filer married S.A. Paine in 1838; she died in June 1839, leaving a daughter. His second wife Juliet died in 1864 leaving four children: Mary J. Filer, E. Golden Filer, Frank Filer, and Delos W. Filer. He was married a third time on January 23, 1866. He married Mary M. Pierce of Manistee, who had a daughter, Grace.

=== Later life and death ===
While traveling, Filer became ill in Denver and returned to Ludington, where he died on July 26, 1879.

Filer had been president of and a main stockholder in the Pere Marquette Lumber Company and Pere Marquette Boom Company. He ran Filer & Sons of Manistee and Cream City Iron Works of Filer, Stowell & Company of Milwaukee. His worth was estimated to be somewhere between $500,000 (equivalent to $14,000,000 in 2020) and $1,000,000. He is buried in Forest Home Cemetery in Milwaukee.
