= Vogue =

Vogue may refer to:

== Business ==
- Vogue (magazine), an American fashion magazine
  - British Vogue, a British edition of an American fashion magazine
  - Vogue Adria, a fashion magazine for West Balkan countries
  - Vogue Arabia, an Arab fashion magazine
  - Vogue Australia, Australian edition of an American fashion magazine
  - Vogue China, Chinese edition of an American fashion magazine
  - Vogue France, French edition of an American fashion magazine
  - Vogue Greece, Greek edition of an American fashion magazine
  - Vogue India, Indian edition of an American fashion magazine
  - Vogue Italia, Italian edition of an American fashion magazine
  - Vogue México y Latinoamérica, Mexican/Latin American edition of an American fashion magazine
  - Vogue Nederland, Dutch edition of an American fashion magazine
  - Vogue Polska, Polish edition of a fashion magazine
  - Vogue Russia, Russian of an American fashion magazine
  - Vogue Scandinavia, Scandinavian edition of an American fashion magazine
  - Vogue Singapore, Singaporean edition of an American fashion magazine
  - Vogue Taiwan, Taiwanese edition of an American fashion magazine
  - Vogue Ukraine, Ukrainian edition of an American fashion magazine
  - Vogue Knitting, a now-defunct sister publication to Vogue, dedicated to knitting
  - Men's Vogue, a sister publication to Vogue, targeted at men
  - Men in Vogue, a sister publication to British Vogue, targeted at men
  - Teen Vogue, a sister publication to Vogue, targeted at teenage girls and young women
- Vogue Records, a short-lived American 1940s label
- Disques Vogue, a French jazz record company
- Singer Vogue, two generations of British cars manufactured by Singer
- Vogue Tyre, a wheel manufacturer based in Chicago
- Vogue (cigarette), an upmarket cigarette brand
- HTC Vogue, a codename for the HTC Tough Pocket PC
- The Vogue, venue in Broad Ripple Village, Indianapolis, US

== Music ==
- The Vogue, an American rock band from Seattle
- "Vogue" (song), 1990 song by Madonna
- "Vogue" (KMFDM song), 1992
- "Vogue" (Ayumi Hamasaki song), 2000
- "The Vogue", a song by Antonelli Electr. featuring Miss Kittin

== Places ==
- Vogue, Cornwall, UK, a hamlet
- Vogüé, a village in Ardèche department, France

== Events ==
- Met Gala
- Vogue World 2024

== People ==
- Eugène-Melchior de Vogüé (1848–1910), French diplomat
- Marthe de Vogüé (1860–1923), French political activist
- Melchior de Vogüé (1829–1916), French archaeologist, uncle of the above
- Nelly de Vogüé (1908–2003), French writer, painter, and business executive, granddaughter-in-law of the above
- Vogue Williams (born 1985), Irish model

== Other uses ==
- Vogue (dance), a highly stylized, modern house dance

== See also ==
- Vogue Theatre (disambiguation)
- New Vogue (dance), an Australian form of sequence dancing
- Voulge, a medieval weapon
- Voggue, a disco vocal duo from Canada
