= Nels Johnson =

American clockmaker

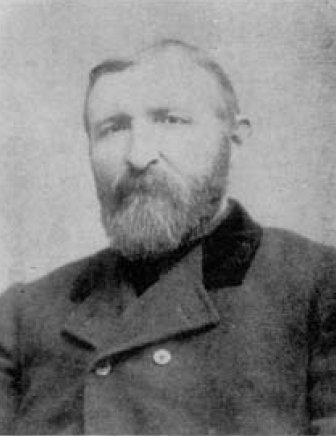
- photograph, circa 1885
- Born: Nels Johnson; November 26, 1838; Denmark
- Died: January 13, 1915 (aged 76)
- Resting place: Oak Grove Cemetery in Manistee, Michigan.
- Occupation: Clockmaker

Nels Johnson (1838–1915) was a Danish-American professional mechanic and engineer. Johnson died in Manistee on January 20, 1915, at the age of 76.

== Sources ==
- Murray, James Augustus Henry (1888). English Dictionary Historical Principles. Clarendon Press. OCLC 1068304435.
- Nicholson, Howard L. (2013). Danes and Icelanders in Michigan. Michigan State University Press. ISBN 9781628950397.
- RPC (1895). Portrait & biographical record Northern Michigan. Record Publishing Company. OCLC 1048537921.
