= Parkdale, Michigan =

- Census-designated place (CDP) & unincorporated community
- Location within Michigan Location within the United States
- Coordinates: 44°16′03″N 86°18′10″W
- Country: United States
- State: Michigan
- County: Manistee
- Township: Manistee

Area
  - Total: 1.55 sq mi (4.01 km^{2})
  - Land: 1.55 sq mi (4.01 km^{2})
  - Water: 0 sq mi (0.00 km^{2})
- Elevation: 600 ft (180 m)

Population (2020)
  - Total: 607
  - Density: 392.2/sq mi (151.42/km^{2})
- Time zone: UTC-5 (Eastern (EST))
  - Summer (DST): UTC-4 (EDT)
- ZIP Code: 49660 (Manistee)
- Area code: 231
- GNIS feature ID: 634378
- FIPS code: 26-62500

Parkdale is an unincorporated community and census-designated place (CDP) within Manistee Township, Manistee County, Michigan, United States. Its population was 607 as of the 2020 census, down from 704 in 2010.

== History ==
The community had a rural post office from April 1897 to September 1898 and again from October 1898 to April 1900. From 1927 until 2003, Parkdale was the southern terminus of M-110.

== Geography ==
The community is in southwestern Manistee Township, on the northern edge of Manistee Lake where the Manistee River enters the lake. It is on US 31 near the junction with M-55 on the northern boundary of the Manistee city limits.

According to the U.S. Census Bureau, the Parkdale CDP has an area of 1.548 square miles (4.01 km^{2}), all of it land.

== Demographics ==
Historical population
Census	Pop.	Note	%±
2010	704		—
2020	607		−13.8%
U.S. Decennial Census
