= Stronach Township, Michigan =

- Township
- Location within Michigan Location within the United States
- Coordinates: 44°12′11″N 86°10′38″W
- Country: United States
- State: Michigan
- County: Manistee

Area
  - Total: 55.7 sq mi (144 km^{2})
  - Land: 55.1 sq mi (143 km^{2})
  - Water: 0.5 sq mi (1.3 km^{2})
- Elevation: 690 ft (210 m)

Population (2020)
  - Total: 834
  - Density: 15.1/sq mi (5.8/km^{2})
- Time zone: UTC-5 (Eastern (EST))
  - Summer (DST): UTC-4 (EDT)
- ZIP codes: 49660 (Manistee); 49411 (Free Soil)
- Area code: 231
- FIPS code: 26-101-76840
- GNIS feature ID: 1627128
- Website: stronachtownship.net

Stronach Township is a civil township of Manistee County in the U.S. state of Michigan. The population was 834 at the 2020 census.

== History ==
Stronach Township is the oldest non-native settlement in Manistee County. In 1840 Joseph Stronach cleared a site to establish a sawmill in the township. In 1841 Joseph Stronach's brother David Stronach and his son Adam Stronach arrived by schooner with machinery and approximately 15 men to begin construction of the sawmill.

== Communities ==
- Stronach is an unincorporated community and census designated place on the western boundary of the township along the southeast end of Lake Manistee at 44°12′48″N 86°16′31″W The settlement was first called "Paggeotville" and was renamed when John and Adam Stronach built a sawmill in 1841. A post office opened August 9, 1866 and was discontinued on December 21, 1893. Other sources indicate the post office operated until March 31, 1954 or until December 21, 1983. The area is now served by the Manistee post office with ZIP code 49660.

== Geography ==
Stronach is in southern Manistee County and is bordered to the northwest by the city of Manistee, the county seat. The southern border of the township is the Mason County line. According to the U.S. Census Bureau, the township has a total area of 55.7 square miles (144 km^{2}), of which 55.1 square miles (143 km^{2}) are land and 0.5 square miles (1.3 km^{2}), or 0.96%, are water. The Little Manistee River crosses the township from southeast to northwest, reaching Manistee Lake at the community of Stronach.

== Demographics ==
As of the census of 2000, there were 804 people, 347 households, and 235 families residing in the township. The population density was 14.5 per square mile (5.6/km^{2}). There were 549 housing units at an average density of 9.9 per square mile (3.8/km^{2}). The racial makeup of the township was 95.40% White, 2.74% Native American, 0.12% Asian, 0.37% from other races, and 1.37% from two or more races. Hispanic or Latino of any race were 0.75% of the population.

There were 347 households, out of which 27.7% had children under the age of 18 living with them, 56.5% were married couples living together, 7.8% had a female householder with no husband present, and 32.0% were non-families. 28.2% of all households were made up of individuals, and 11.8% had someone living alone who was 65 years of age or older. The average household size was 2.32 and the average family size was 2.82.

In the township the population was spread out, with 22.0% under the age of 18, 4.6% from 18 to 24, 28.4% from 25 to 44, 29.1% from 45 to 64, and 15.9% who were 65 years of age or older. The median age was 42 years. For every 100 females, there were 117.9 males. For every 100 females age 18 and over, there were 110.4 males.

The median income for a household in the township was $36,181, and the median income for a family was $40,625. Males had a median income of $36,563 versus $21,369 for females. The per capita income for the township was $17,683. About 3.8% of families and 5.4% of the population were below the poverty line, including 7.8% of those under age 18 and 4.7% of those age 65 or over.

== Wildlife ==
Stronach is located within the Huron–Manistee National Forests and has thousands of acres of unspoiled habitat for wildlife. In addition to world class fly fishing, the following may be found within the township: white-tailed deer, mink, black bear, bald eagle, coyote, and the invasive savannah monitor lizard.
