= Frederick Winthrop Ramsdell =

American painter

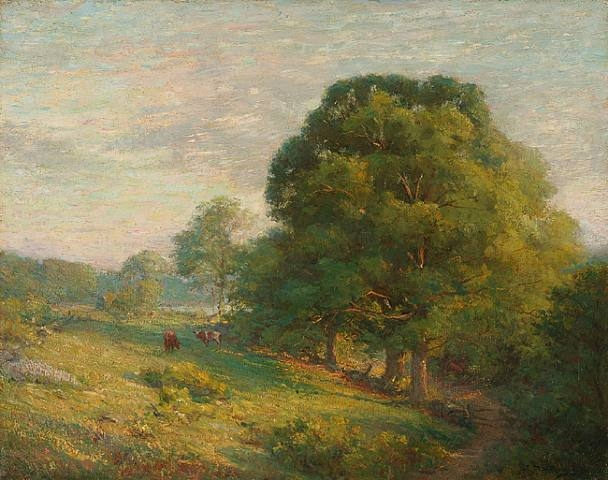
A June Day, 1910, oil on canvas

Frederick Winthrop Ramsdell (9 December 1865 – 27 May 1915) was an American artist, best known for his iconic poster advertising American Crescent Cycles.

His father was attorney Thomas Jefferson Ramsdell. Frederick Ramsdell was from Manistee, Michigan and studied at the Art Students League of New York under James Carroll Beckwith and later in Paris under R. Collin. (possibly Arthur George Collins). His work was shown at the Paris Salon between 1891 and 1898. He spent some years in France and Italy before returning to the States and settling in Connecticut. He owned two properties – one in Lyme on Grassy Hill Road in 1907 and the second in Old Lyme on Sill Lane in 1915.

Ramsdell became a member of the Impressionist Old Lyme Art Colony in 1907, and the Lyme Art Association, exhibiting with them between 1907 and 1915.
