= Manistee High School =

Manistee Middle High School

Location
- 525 12th Street; Manistee, Michigan 49660; United States
- Coordinates: 44°14′04″N 86°19′30″W

Information
- Type: Public secondary school
- School district: Manistee Area Public Schools
- Superintendent: Ronald Stoneman
- Principal: Morgan Nowicki
- Teaching staff: 33.20 (on an FTE basis)
- Grades: 6–12
- Enrollment: 669 (2023-2024)
- Student to teacher ratio: 20.15
- Colors: Navy blue Gold
- Athletics conference: West Michigan Conference
- Nickname: Mariners
- Rival: Ludington High School
- Yearbook: Manichigan
- Website: www.manisteemariners.org/manistee-middle-high-school/

Manistee High School is a public secondary school in Manistee, Michigan, United States. It serves grades 6-12 for the Manistee Area Public Schools.

== Athletics ==
Manistee's Mariners compete in the West Michigan Conference. School colors are Navy blue and gold. The following Michigan High School Athletic Association (MHSAA) sanctioned sports are offered:

- Baseball (boys)
- Basketball (girls and boys)
  - Girls state champion - 1982
- Competitive cheerleading (girls)
- Cross country (girls and boys)
- Football (boys)
- Golf (girls and boys)
- Ice hockey (boys)
- Skiing (girls and boys)
  - Girls state champion - 2009
- Soccer (girls and boys)
- Softball (girls)
- Swim and dive (girls and boys)
- Tennis (girls)
- Track and field (girls and boys)
- Volleyball (girls)
- Wrestling (girls and boys)

Prior to 2023, the school's teams were known as the "Chippewas". The school retired the indigenous nickname in favor of the name "Mariners".
