= M-110 (Michigan highway) =

Former state highway in Manistee County, Michigan, United States

M-110
- Lake Shore Road
- M-110 highlighted in red

Route information
- Maintained by MDOT
- Length: 1.715 mi (2.760 km)
- Existed: 1927–2003

Major junctions
- South end: US 31 in Parkdale
- North end: Kott Road north of Parkdale

Location
- Country: United States
- State: Michigan
- Counties: Manistee

Highway system
- Michigan State Trunkline Highway System; Interstate; US; State; Byways
← M-109	→ M-111

M-110 was the designation of a former state trunkline highway in the US state of Michigan. The highway was a 1.715-mile-long (2.760 km) spur that provided access from US Highway 31 (US 31) to Orchard Beach State Park. The highway was designated in 1927 and lasted until 2003.

== Route description ==
The southern terminus of M-110 was at a junction with US 31 near Parkdale on the northern boundary of the city of Manistee. From there, the trunkline traveled north along Lake Shore Road near Lake Michigan. Along the way, the highway passed through the unincorporated community of Parkdale. The landscape contained fields as the roadway approached the forest at Orchard Beach State Park. M-110 continued past the park and terminated at an intersection with Kott Road.

== History ==
A highway was first designated along Lakeshore Road in 1927 bearing the M-110 designation. The highway was improved the following year. That year, M-110 was listed as one of a few rural highways that had streetlights. In a 1972 profile, M-110 was listed as one of the 13 shortest highways in the state, noting its connection to Orchard Beach State Park.

In 2003, the Michigan Department of Transportation (MDOT) transferred M-110 to the Manistee County Road Commission. In the last traffic surveys before the transfer, MDOT determined that an average of 2,335 vehicles used M-110 on a daily basis in 2002.

== Major intersections ==
The entire highway was in Manistee Township, Manistee County.

mi	km	Destinations	Notes
0.000	0.000	US 31 / LMCT – Manistee, Traverse City	
1.715	2.760	Kott Road	
1.000 mi = 1.609 km; 1.000 km = 0.621 mi
