= Ramsdell Theatre =

Historic theater in Manistee, Michigan

- U.S. National Register of Historic Places
- Michigan State Historic Site
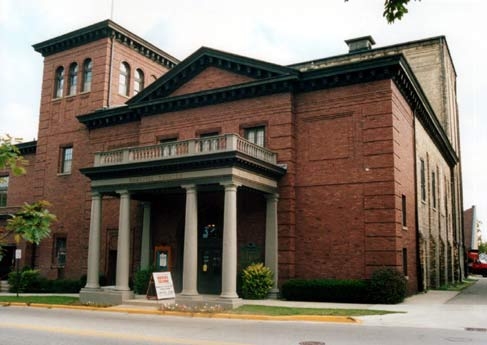

- Location within Michigan Location within the United States
- Interactive map
- Location: 101 Maple St, Manistee, Michigan
- Coordinates: 44°14′45.06″N 86°19′25.74″W
- Area: 1 acre (0.40 ha)
- Built: 1902—1903
- Architect: Solon Spencer Beman
- Architectural style: possible Colonial Revival architecture or Greek Revival architecture
- NRHP reference No.: 72000640
- Added to NRHP: January 13, 1972

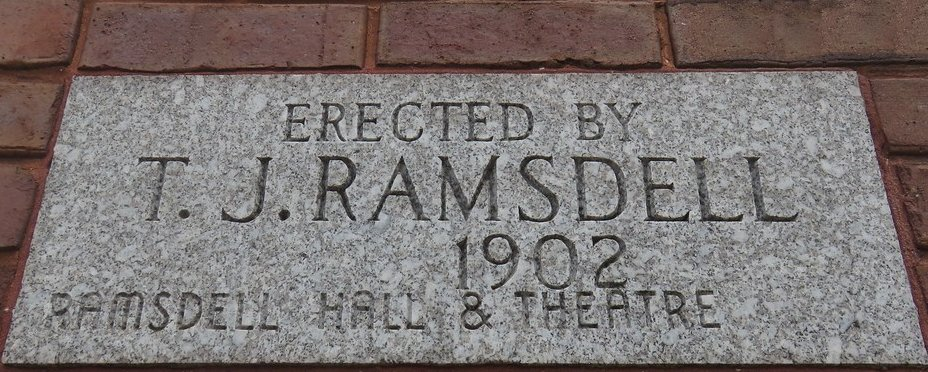
Ramsdell erected tablet on building

The Ramsdell Theatre is a historic playhouse theater building and opera house at 101 Maple Street in downtown Manistee, Michigan. The building was financed by local businessman and politician Thomas Jefferson Ramsdell and was built in 1902. It replaced the town's two previous opera houses which had been destroyed by fire, one in 1882 and the other in 1900. Besides producing plays the facility was later used as a movie theater. James Earl Jones started his acting career at the theater as an actor and stage manager.

== Building features ==
The Ramsdell Theatre, characterized by the Society of Architectural Historians' Archipedia as "the finest of several opera houses built in small Michigan cities at the turn of the twentieth century", was constructed between 1902 and 1903, paid for by the town's only lawyer Thomas Jefferson Ramsdell at a cost of $100,000, equivalent to $3,131,923 in 2021. Architect Solon Spencer Beman designed the structure. The building, located at First and Maple Streets, was designated a National Historic Landmark in 1972 and the state of Michigan named the Theater as a Michigan Historic Site in 1980. (Note: The Theatre's Michigan Registered Historic Site Marker, dated 1980, can be seen on the Ramsdell Theatre's website.) The Theatre & the adjacent Hall together serve as a community center for the surrounding area.

The general design has been described as Greek Revival or Grecian architecture and also as a classic Colonial design. The National Register Nomination form has the building's design being of Greek and Italianate styles. The front is a design of red brick with Doric columns that support the flat portico over the building's main entryway. The Theatre and the Ramsdell Great Hall (the adjoining assembly hall), are distinct buildings from each other. There is a solid wall in-between, although both were built at almost the same time. The building has a hipped roof, with a closely spaced teeth-like block modillion cornice, a decorated colonnaded porch, an overarched entrance, ornamental brick panels, and an interior dome mural.

The theater features two balconies with private viewing boxes along the main floor. The seating has been cut back to 489 from its original capacity of 1200, one reason being the upper balcony has been closed-off to the public because of fire safety. Two seating boxes are located almost on each end of the stage with two additional ones in the lower balcony. An unusual feature of the interior is that the balconies are in the general shape of a horseshoe. The auditorium has been altered more than the outside of the building, the major difference in the present interior being the addition of a projection booth in the middle of the top balcony. Though the specific date the booth was constructed is unknown, it was built sometime before April 1925 — a 2012 article in The Manistee News Advocate quotes its April 8 edition: "The Ramsdell has been equipped with two of the latest type motion projection machines and they are already in place in a fireproof room at the rear of the balcony."

The stage is 34 feet (10 m) deep and 60 feet (18 m) wide with a proscenium arch of 26 feet (7.9 m). The raised frame from which lighting is suspended over the stage is 70 feet (21 m) while two fly galleries are almost 30 feet (9.1 m) above the stage. In addition, a paint gallery that is 33 feet 10 inches (10.31 m) above the stage floor permitted the scenery backdrops to be painted while they were hung rather than having to climb on a ladder or lay them flat on a floor. The theatre has nine trapdoors — three can be lowered beneath while six can be raised from the stage.

Walter Burridge created the front curtain – A Grove Near Athens – which is still in use at the present time. Burridge was a notable artist who painted theatrical scenery for plays and opera companies throughout the United States. He also created cycloramas for prominent national exhibitions. Artist Frederick Winthrop Ramsdell, Thomas Jefferson Ramsdell's son, painted both the dome in the auditorium and the two lunettes in the lobby. The lobby scenes depict women listening to a young musician and the dome in the house shows Venus, ringed by cherubs and riding a chariot through the sky.

== Theatre planning and construction ==
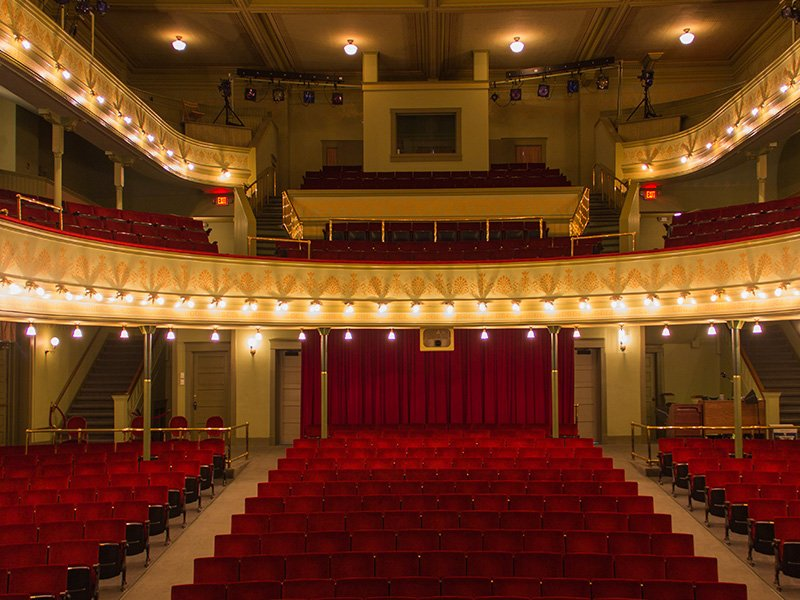
Ramsdell Theatre interior 2005

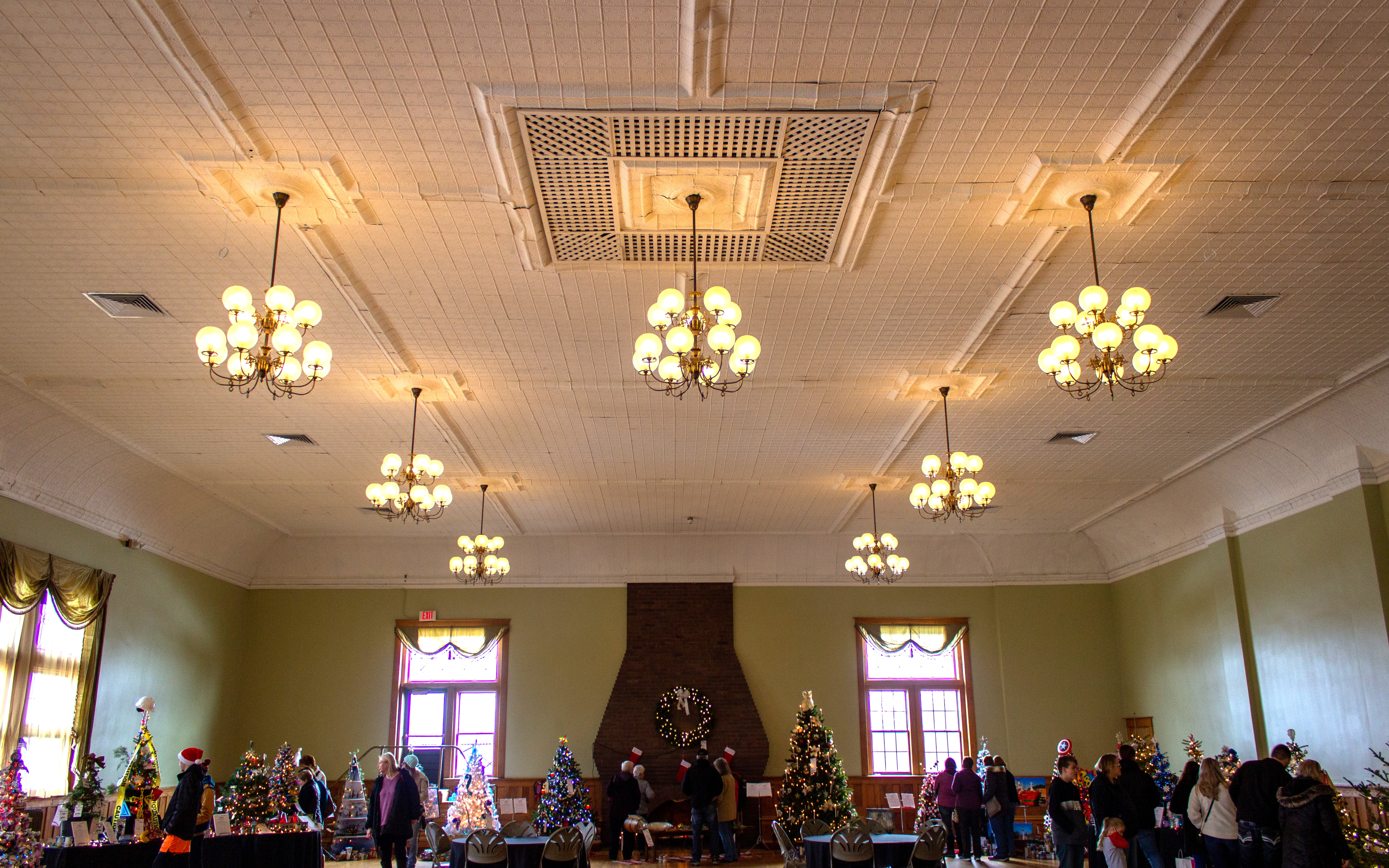
Ramsdell Theatre grand ballroom 2019

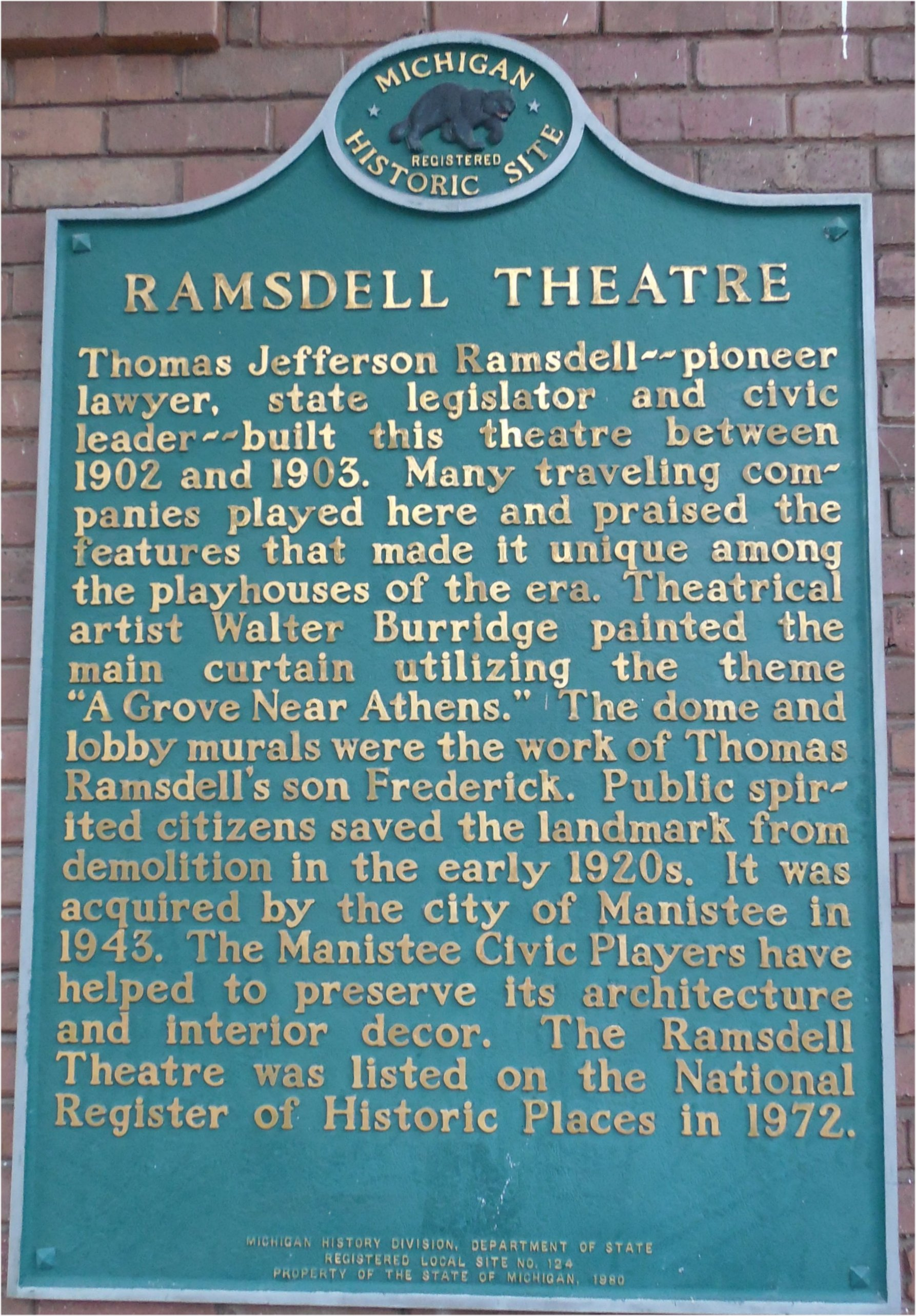
Ramsdell Theatre historic marker

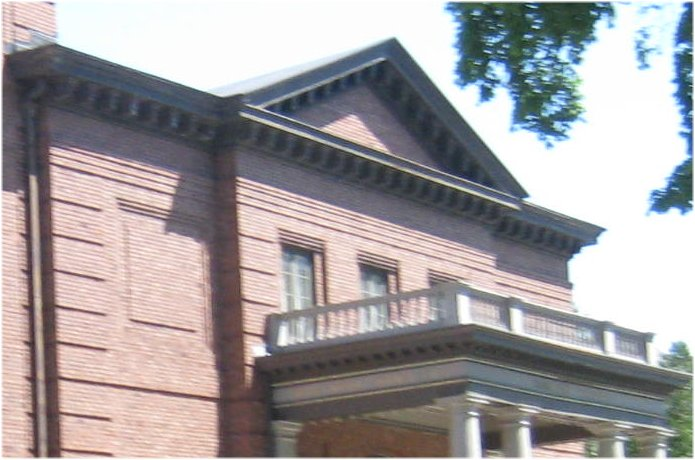
Ramsdell Theatre hipped roof + dentil

Planning for the building began in 1901 after the two previous Manistee opera houses were destroyed by fire. The third opera house, built by Ramsdell, is the structure that still stands and is being used today as the Ramsdell Theater.

The neighboring Assembly Hall was finished in 1901 before the Theatre and an opening ball was held in December 1902 by the local Manistee Retail Clerk's Union. The theater itself officially opened on September 4, 1903, with a performance of A Chinese Honeymoon. Ticket prices for this first production went from $25 for the best seats in the house to $10 for the upper balcony, ticket prices for succeeding productions were lower. The Theatre was referred to as "Ramsdell's Folly" when it was constructed, partly because of its notorious high cost. Its original budget was for $25,000 (equivalent to $968,000 in 2025), but it ultimately cost $100,000 (equivalent to $3,721,000 in 2025) when finally built.

== History ==
From 1903 until 1914 the Theatre was used for a variety of events including plays from professional touring companies, community events such as amateur plays and also movie screenings. By 1914 the Theatre's original purpose as a performance space was no longer in evidence. By the 1920s the theatre space was largely abandoned and remained unused for any stage productions until 1951.

Ramsdell died in 1917. The theater was purchased for $25,000 (equivalent to $459,000 in 2025) from his estate in 1925 by the Manistee Rotary Club. The Club ran the theatre mostly as a cinema with infrequent vaudeville performances. By the 1920s the theatre space was largely abandoned and remained almost unused for any stage productions until 1951 though the Butterfield Theatre chain leased it in 1927 to show movies. Butterfield held the lease until the City of Manistee gained control in 1941.

The Manistee Civic Players formed in 1939. The Butterfield company permitted the Players to use the theater space for two plays and their rehearsals a year. The Civic Players performed multiple productions over the next few years. In 1943 the City of Manistee bought the Theatre from the Rotary Club, The City used only the Assembly Hall for the Manistee Recreation Association, leaving the Theatre itself shuttered. In 1950 a group of women's clubs formed the Civic Betterment Committee with the purpose being to restore the Ramsdell Theatre back to its original purpose.

The Manistee Drama Festival was formed in 1951. That first season productions included George Washington Slept Here, Dracula, and Blithe Spirit. By this time a number of restoration objectives were accomplished by the profits from these productions. In 1952 the Festival was renamed the Manistee Summer Theatre and Madge Skelly was hired as associate/assistant director. Skelly directed eight plays that same year and was named managing director in 1953, the same year that the city of Manistee purchased the theater and hall. Skelly was responsible for the Summer Theatre until 1961. The Manistee Civic Players began producing three or four shows each year after 1963. One of them each year is designated for a musical production and sometimes a second one.

Actor James Earl Jones was a stage carpenter and an occasional actor at Ramsdell during the 1953 summer stock season. From 1955 to 1957 he served as The Summer Theatre's stage manager as well as taking on more challenging roles. Jones' first appearance onstage as Shakespeare's Othello was at the Ramsdell in 1956, he played the role while also serving as stage carpenter and stage manager. He has returned twice to support fundraising efforts for the restoration project.

In 1990 the Ramsdell Restoration Committee was formed for fundraising and managing restoration. The Ramsdell Governance Committee was formed in 2005 by the business people of Manistee and the city took over the responsibility for the building in 2006.

=== Historical Marker ===
There is a Michigan State Historical Marker placed at the front entrance of the theater.
