= Manistee Township, Michigan =

- Township
- Location within Michigan Location within the United States
- Coordinates: 44°16′24″N 86°16′5″W
- Country: United States
- State: Michigan
- County: Manistee

Area
  - Total: 48.2 sq mi (125 km^{2})
  - Land: 44.4 sq mi (115 km^{2})
  - Water: 3.8 sq mi (9.8 km^{2})
- Elevation: 719 ft (219 m)

Population (2020)
  - Total: 4,022
  - Density: 90.6/sq mi (35.0/km^{2})
- Time zone: UTC-5 (Eastern (EST))
  - Summer (DST): UTC-4 (EDT)
- ZIP codes: 49660 (Manistee); 49626 (Eastlake); 49675 (Onekama)
- Area code: 231
- FIPS code: 26-101-50740
- GNIS feature ID: 1626667
- Website: www.manisteetownship.com

Manistee Township is a civil township of Manistee County in the U.S. state of Michigan. The population was 4,022 at the 2020 census.

== Communities ==
- The city of Manistee borders the township to the southwest.
- The village of Eastlake is in the southwest corner of the township.
- Parkdale is an unincorporated community in the southwest part of the township, on the northern edge of Manistee Lake where the Manistee River enters the lake. It is at 44°16′03″N 86°18′10″W on US 31, near the junction with M-55 on northern boundary of the Manistee city limits. From 1927 until 2003, Parkdale was the southern terminus of M-110. The community had a rural post office from April 1897 to September 1898 and again from October 1898 to April 1900.

== Geography ==
According to the United States Census Bureau, Manistee Township has a total area of 48.2 square miles (125 km^{2}), of which 44.4 square miles (115 km^{2}) are land and 3.8 square miles (9.8 km^{2}), or 7.92%, are water. The Manistee River crosses the southern part of the township, flowing into Manistee Lake at the southwest border.

=== Major highways ===
- US 31 follows a southwest–northeast route in the township.
- M-55 has its western terminus in the township, and continues east.

== Demographics ==
As of the census of 2000, there were 3,764 people, 1,188 households, and 864 families residing in the township. The population density was 84.6 inhabitants per square mile (32.7/km^{2}). There were 1,391 housing units at an average density of 31.3 per square mile (12.1/km^{2}). The racial makeup of the township was 84.62% White, 9.14% African American, 2.13% Native American, 0.48% Asian, 0.03% Pacific Islander, 1.12% from other races, and 2.50% from two or more races. Hispanic or Latino of any race were 2.74% of the population.

There were 1,188 households, out of which 28.0% had children under the age of 18 living with them, 62.8% were married couples living together, 6.9% had a female householder with no husband present, and 27.2% were non-families. 24.3% of all households were made up of individuals, and 10.7% had someone living alone who was 65 years of age or older. The average household size was 2.43 and the average family size was 2.88.

In the township the population was spread out, with 17.2% under the age of 18, 9.2% from 18 to 24, 32.7% from 25 to 44, 25.3% from 45 to 64, and 15.7% who were 65 years of age or older. The median age was 40 years. For every 100 females, there were 142.2 males. For every 100 females age 18 and over, there were 155.3 males.

The median income for a household in the township was $39,946, and the median income for a family was $48,684. Males had a median income of $35,574 versus $21,555 for females. The per capita income for the township was $16,442. About 3.8% of families and 4.8% of the population were below the poverty line, including 5.1% of those under age 18 and 4.4% of those age 65 or over.

== Government and infrastructure ==
The Michigan Department of Corrections Oaks Correctional Facility is in the township.
