= WMTE (AM) =

- Manistee, Michigan; United States
- Frequency: 1340 kHz
- Branding: Talk Radio 1340

Programming
- Format: News/talk
- Affiliations: Michigan IMG Sports Network

Ownership
- Owner: Lake Michigan Broadcasting

History
- First air date: June 7, 1951
- Last air date: August 15, 2017
- Call sign meaning: Manistee

Technical information
- Facility ID: 10812
- Class: C
- Power: 1,000 watts
- Transmitter coordinates: 44°14′7″N 86°19′5″W

WMTE (1340 AM) was a radio station broadcasting a news/talk format. Licensed to Manistee, Michigan, it first began broadcasting on June 7, 1951, from facilities located on "Radio Hill" on the southern city limits of Manistee near the intersection of 10th and Olga Streets. The station surrendered its license on August 15, 2017.

== Profile ==
The original radio station was housed in a World War II surplus prefab building erected at the transmitter site. Transmitter power was 250 watts with a single transmission tower, typical of Class IV radio stations of that time. In 1962, WMTE increased power to 1000 watts daytime and 250 watts at night. Later Federal Communications Commission (FCC) rule changes raised the nighttime power limit to 1000 watts for most Class IV (later Class C) stations.

WMTE last operated out of downtown studios on Greenbush St. in Manistee, Michigan. The station continued to use the original transmitter location and tower on "Radio Hill" until it went silent on October 1, 2010.

Bernie Schroeder was a radio broadcaster for 51 years and is a member of the Michigan Radio Hall of Fame.

WMTE announced that it had been sold to Ft. Bend Broadcasting on September 24, 2010. The press release said that it would be signing off permanently on September 30, 2010. The station officially went silent just after midnight on Friday, October 1, 2010.

Roy S. Henderson and Lake Michigan Broadcasting acquired the WMTE license in November 2010. WMTE, along with sister station WCUZ (100.1 FM), then aired a talk format branded as "Talk Radio 1340 WMTE".

WMTE surrendered its license to the FCC on August 15, 2017; it was cancelled on August 21.
