= Manistee, Michigan =

- City
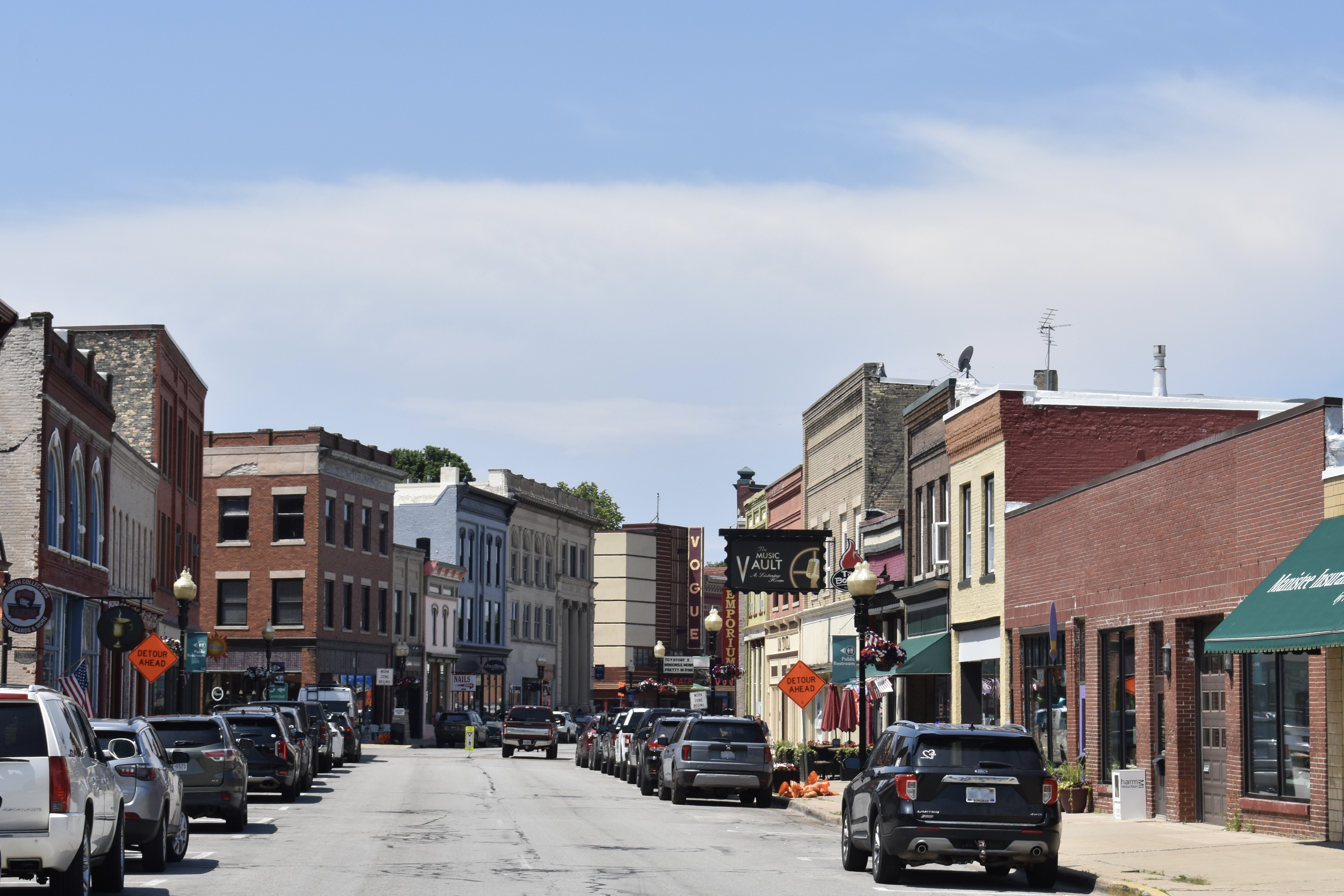
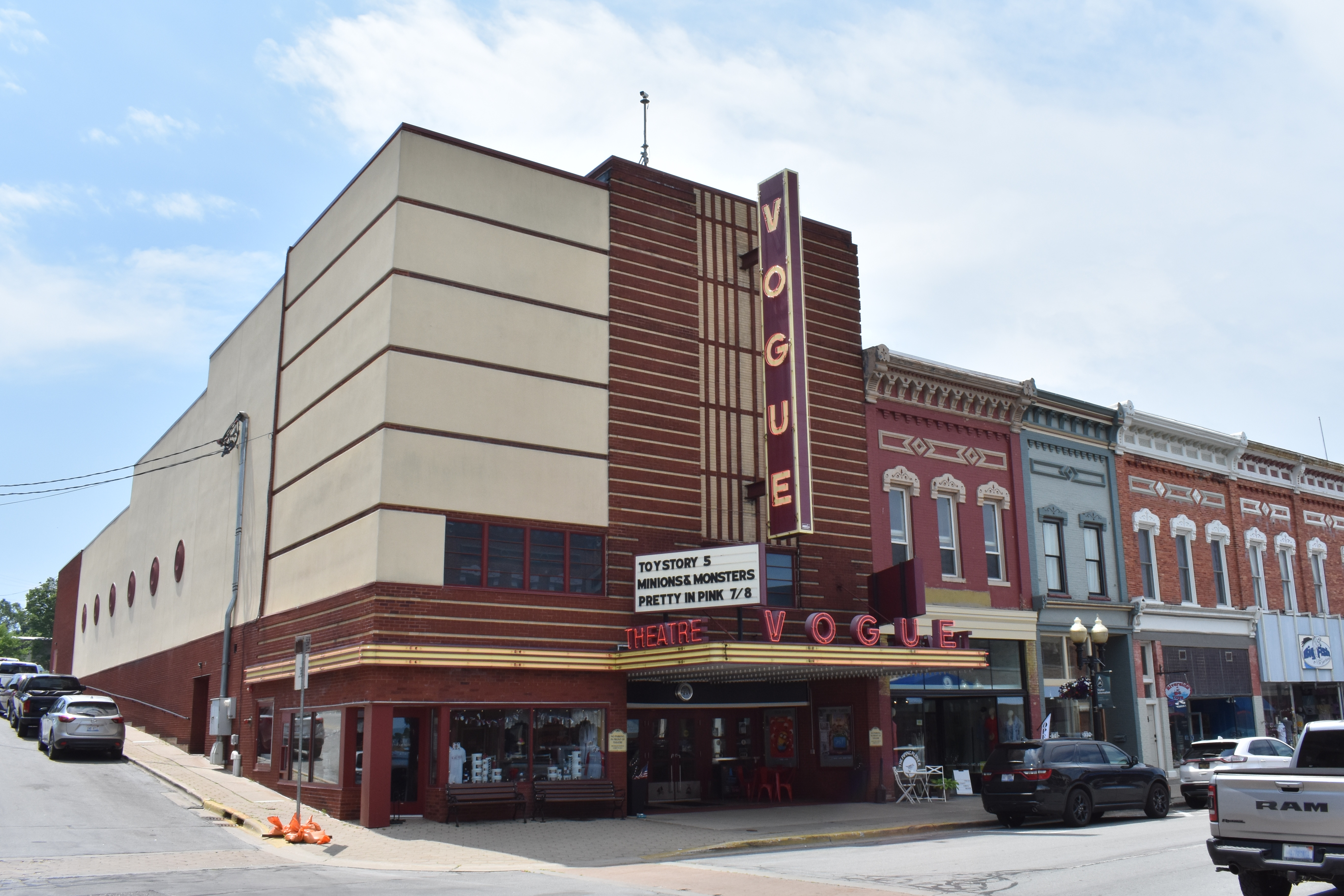
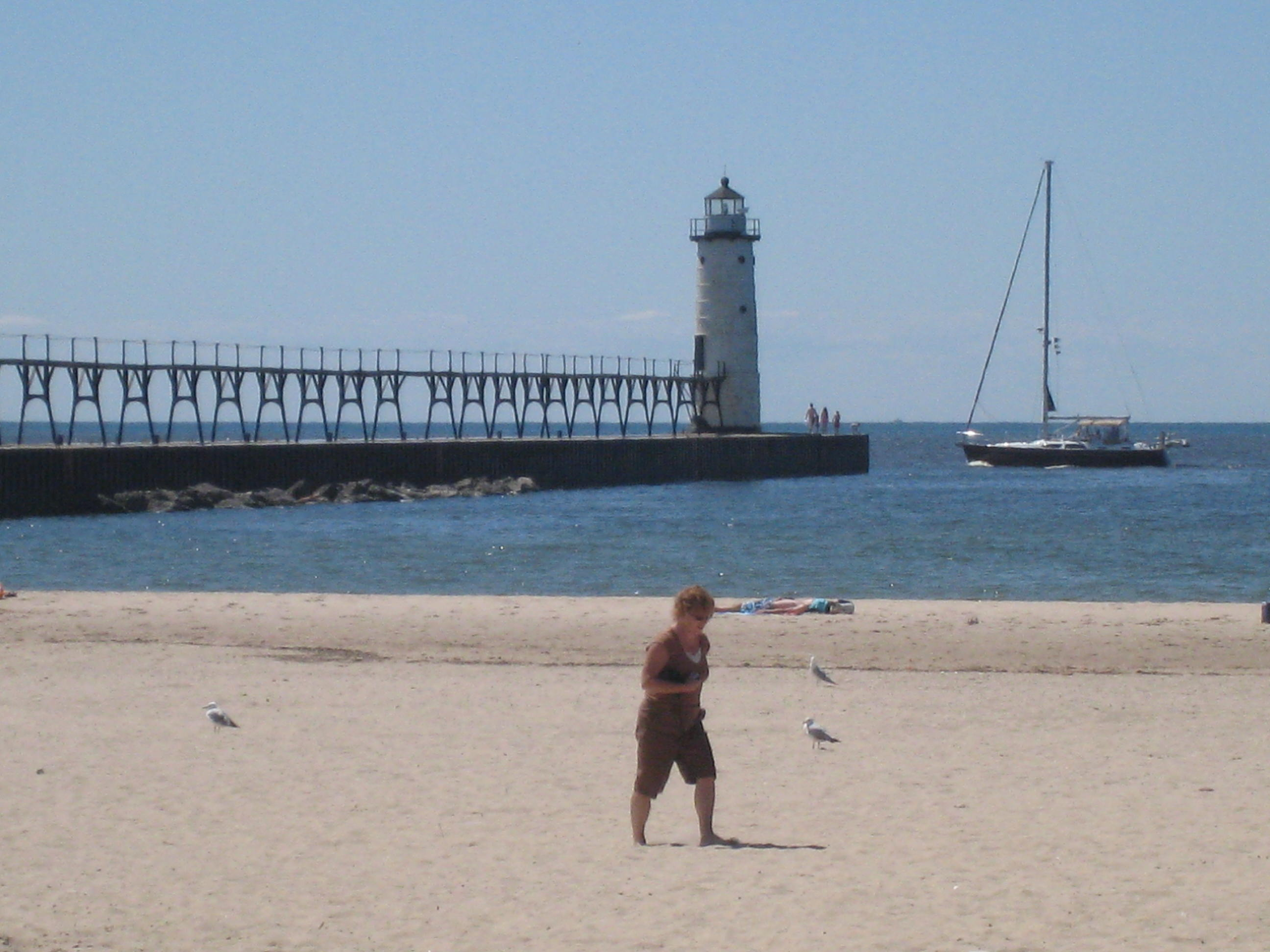
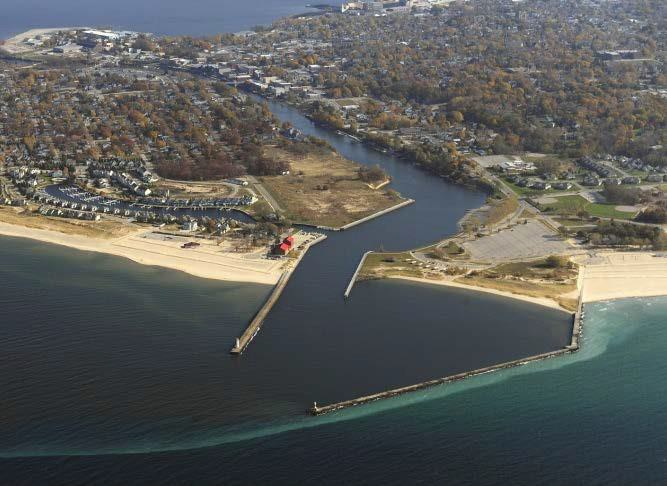
- Manistee Central Business District Vogue Theatre Manistee Breakwater Lighthouse Mouth of the Manistee River at Lake Michigan. Downtown Manistee and Manistee Lake are in the background.
- Nickname: "Salt City (of the Inland Seas)"
- Location of Manistee, Michigan

- Location in the United States
- Coordinates: 44°14′37″N 86°19′17″W
- Country: United States
- State: Michigan
- County: Manistee
- Settled: April 16, 1841

Area
  - Total: 4.53 sq mi (11.73 km^{2})
  - Land: 3.28 sq mi (8.49 km^{2})
  - Water: 1.25 sq mi (3.24 km^{2})
- Elevation: 663 ft (202 m)

Population (2020)
  - Total: 6,259
  - Density: 1,908.9/sq mi (737.04/km^{2})
- Time zone: UTC-5 (Eastern (EST))
  - Summer (DST): UTC-4 (EDT)
- ZIP code: 49660
- Area code: 231
- FIPS code: 26-50720
- GNIS feature ID: 1620680
- Website: manisteemi.gov

Manistee (/mænɪsti/ man-iss-TEE) is a city in the U.S. state of Michigan. Located in southwestern Manistee County, it is part of the northwestern Lower Peninsula. Manistee is the county seat of Manistee County, and its population was 6,259 at the 2020 census. This makes Manistee the fifth-largest city in Northern Michigan.

Manistee is located on an isthmus between Manistee Lake and Lake Michigan, with the Manistee River bisecting the city as it flows west to the latter. Manistee is located along US 31, one of the major trunkline highways of the state.

== Etymology ==
The name "Manistee" is from an Ojibwe word first applied to the principal river of the county. The derivation is not certain, but it may be from ministigweyaa, "river with islands at its mouth". Other sources claim that it was an Ojibwe term meaning "spirit of the woods".

== History ==
In 1751, a Jesuit mission was established in Manistee. Missionaries visited Manistee in the early 19th century, and a Jesuit mission house is known to have been located on the northwest shore of Manistee Lake in 1826. In 1832, a group of traders from Massachusetts built a log house up the Manistee River. However, they were soon driven off by the Odawa nation. The first white settlement and sawmill was built there in 1841.

In 1830, the village of Manistee was one of about 15 Odawa (Ottawa) villages along the shore of Lake Michigan. Much of the Manistee River Valley, including Manistee itself, was designated as an Odawa Reservation from 1836 to 1848.

The first permanent Euro-American settlement was made on April 16, 1841, when John Stronach and his son, Adam Stronach, arrived at the mouth of the Manistee River in a schooner loaded with fifteen men and equipment, and established a sawmill.

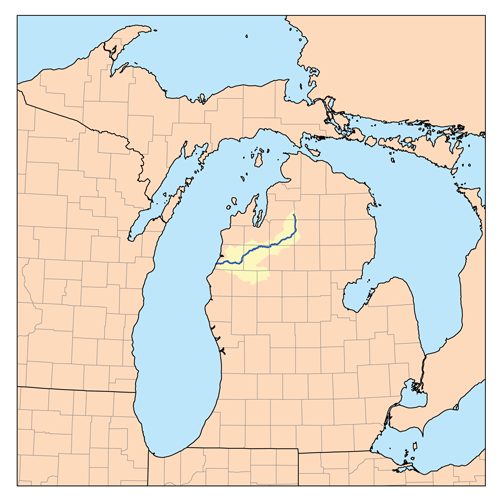
From 1836 to 1848, much of the Manistee River Valley, including Manistee itself, was an Ottawa Reservation. During the lumbering era of the late 1800s, Manistee became a significant site for lumber mills. Huge numbers of white pine logs were floated down the river to the port at Manistee and eventually on to the lumber markets of Grand Rapids, Milwaukee and Chicago.

In 1846, the town was named "Manistee"; it was made part of Ottawa County, whose county offices were 100 miles (160 km) away at Grand Haven. After a series of new counties were organized, by 1855 Manistee was part of a large Manistee County that also included modern-day Wexford and Missaukee counties. Thomas Jefferson Ramsdell, Manistee's first lawyer, moved there in 1860 and remained there until his death in 1917. Ramsdell owned the first hardware store in the city, and was responsible for the construction of a bridge across the Manistee River.

On October 8, 1871, the town was practically destroyed by fire; on the same day that the Peshtigo Fire, the Great Chicago Fire, and fires in Port Huron and Holland occurred, the Great Michigan Fire burned Manistee. Manistee was incorporated as a city in 1882.

=== 21st century ===
In 2000, Manistee made national headlines after a local jury convicted a woman for expressing to her mother near a Hispanic family in a restaurant her wish that immigrants would learn English; the judge described it as "insulting conduct" consisting of "fighting words", an offense that was punishable under a local ordinance. Allegations appeared of improper procedure and irregularities in the court records. Two years later (November 1, 2002) and after the defendant spent four nights in jail, the conviction was overturned by the state Court of Appeals.

== Geography ==
Manistee is in southwestern Manistee County in northern Michigan, bordered to the west by Lake Michigan and to the east by Manistee Lake. The Manistee River connects the two lakes, cutting through the middle of the city. According to the United States Census Bureau, Manistee has a total area of 4.53 square miles (11.73 km^{2}), of which 3.28 square miles (8.50 km^{2}) are land and 1.25 square miles (3.24 km^{2}), or 27.6%, are water. Neighboring and nearby communities include Parkdale to the northeast, Eastlake to the east, and Filer City, Oak Hill, and Stronach to the southeast. The townships that border Manistee are Filer to the south, Stronach to the southeast, and Manistee to the east and northeast.

U.S. Route 31 passes through the center of Manistee as Cypress Street. The highway leads northeast 60 miles (97 km) to Traverse City and south 25 miles (40 km) to the outskirts of Ludington. M-55 intersects US 31 in Parkdale, just east of Manistee, and leads east 47 miles (76 km) to Cadillac.

At the mouth of the Manistee River are the Manistee Pierhead lights (north and south piers) that were built in 1873, and replaced in 1927.

== Climate ==
Climate data for Manistee, Michigan (1991–2020 normals, extremes 1888–present)
Month	Jan	Feb	Mar	Apr	May	Jun	Jul	Aug	Sep	Oct	Nov	Dec	Year
Record high °F (°C)	59 (15)	64 (18)	82 (28)	86 (30)	93 (34)	99 (37)	99 (37)	100 (38)	97 (36)	88 (31)	78 (26)	64 (18)	100 (38)
Mean daily maximum °F (°C)	30.2 (−1.0)	32.5 (0.3)	42.1 (5.6)	54.8 (12.7)	67.1 (19.5)	76.1 (24.5)	79.7 (26.5)	78.1 (25.6)	72.0 (22.2)	59.1 (15.1)	46.1 (7.8)	35.1 (1.7)	56.1 (13.4)
Daily mean °F (°C)	24.4 (−4.2)	25.9 (−3.4)	33.7 (0.9)	44.8 (7.1)	55.9 (13.3)	65.0 (18.3)	69.4 (20.8)	68.4 (20.2)	62.2 (16.8)	50.7 (10.4)	39.5 (4.2)	29.7 (−1.3)	47.5 (8.6)
Mean daily minimum °F (°C)	18.6 (−7.4)	19.2 (−7.1)	25.3 (−3.7)	34.7 (1.5)	44.8 (7.1)	54.0 (12.2)	59.1 (15.1)	58.7 (14.8)	52.4 (11.3)	42.2 (5.7)	33.0 (0.6)	24.4 (−4.2)	38.9 (3.8)
Record low °F (°C)	−20 (−29)	−38 (−39)	−21 (−29)	6 (−14)	21 (−6)	23 (−5)	33 (1)	31 (−1)	23 (−5)	15 (−9)	−8 (−22)	−14 (−26)	−38 (−39)
Average precipitation inches (mm)	2.20 (56)	1.59 (40)	2.22 (56)	3.44 (87)	3.29 (84)	3.76 (96)	3.29 (84)	3.32 (84)	3.26 (83)	4.12 (105)	3.17 (81)	2.68 (68)	36.34 (923)
Average precipitation days (≥ 0.01 in)	17.4	11.5	10.7	11.7	11.9	10.2	9.3	9.5	11.3	14.5	15.2	16.3	149.5
Source: NOAA

== Demographics ==
Historical population
Census	Pop.	Note	%±
1870	3,343		—
1880	6,930		107.3%
1890	12,812		84.9%
1900	14,260		11.3%
1910	12,381		−13.2%
1920	9,694		−21.7%
1930	8,078		−16.7%
1940	8,694		7.6%
1950	8,642		−0.6%
1960	8,324		−3.7%
1970	7,723		−7.2%
1980	7,665		−0.8%
1990	6,734		−12.1%
2000	6,586		−2.2%
2010	6,226		−5.5%
2020	6,259		0.5%
U.S. Decennial Census

=== 2020 census ===
As of the 2020 census, Manistee had a population of 6,259. The median age was 44.2 years. 20.0% of residents were under the age of 18 and 22.7% of residents were 65 years of age or older. For every 100 females there were 90.6 males, and for every 100 females age 18 and over there were 86.9 males age 18 and over.

97.5% of residents lived in urban areas, while 2.5% lived in rural areas.

There were 2,893 households in Manistee, of which 22.7% had children under the age of 18 living in them. Of all households, 36.1% were married-couple households, 21.1% were households with a male householder and no spouse or partner present, and 33.8% were households with a female householder and no spouse or partner present. About 39.2% of all households were made up of individuals and 17.3% had someone living alone who was 65 years of age or older.

There were 3,630 housing units, of which 20.3% were vacant. The homeowner vacancy rate was 2.1% and the rental vacancy rate was 10.6%.

Racial composition as of the 2020 census
Race	Number	Percent
White	5,479	87.5%
Black or African American	58	0.9%
American Indian and Alaska Native	125	2.0%
Asian	32	0.5%
Native Hawaiian and Other Pacific Islander	2	0.0%
Some other race	54	0.9%
Two or more races	509	8.1%
Hispanic or Latino (of any race)	260	4.2%

=== 2010 census ===
As of the census of 2010, there were 6,226 people, 2,816 households, and 1,614 families residing in the city. The population density was 1,892.4 inhabitants per square mile (730.7/km^{2}). There were 3,599 housing units at an average density of 1,093.9 per square mile (422.4/km^{2}). The racial makeup of the city was 91.5% White, 0.5% African American, 3.8% Native American, 0.4% Asian, 0.7% from other races, and 3.0% from two or more races. Hispanic or Latino of any race were 3.4% of the population.

There were 2,816 households, of which 26.2% had children under the age of 18 living with them, 39.1% were married couples living together, 13.4% had a female householder with no husband present, 4.9% had a male householder with no wife present, and 42.7% were non-families. 36.4% of all households were made up of individuals, and 14.7% had someone living alone who was 65 years of age or older. The average household size was 2.18 and the average family size was 2.82.

The median age in the city was 43.6 years. 21.9% of residents were under the age of 18; 8% were between the ages of 18 and 24; 21.9% were from 25 to 44; 30.1% were from 45 to 64; and 18% were 65 years of age or older. The gender makeup of the city was 48.5% male and 51.5% female.

=== 2000 census ===
As of the census of 2000, there were 6,586 people, 2,912 households, and 1,729 families residing in the city. The population density was 2,023.7 inhabitants per square mile (781.4/km^{2}). There were 3,426 housing units at an average density of 1,052.7 per square mile (406.4/km^{2}). The racial makeup of the city was 94.9% White, 0.3% African American, 1.4% Native American, 0.5% Asian, nil% Pacific Islander, 1.0% from other races, and 1.9% from two or more races. Hispanic or Latino of any race were 2.2% of the population.

There were 2,912 households, out of which 27.5% had children under the age of 18 living with them, 42.8% were married couples living together, 12.3% had a female householder with no husband present, and 40.6% were non-families. 35.1% of all households were made up of individuals, and 17.8% had someone living alone who was 65 years of age or older. The average household size was 2.24 and the average family size was 2.88.

In the city, the age distribution of the population shows 24.0% under the age of 18, 7.3% from 18 to 24, 26.2% from 25 to 44, 23.1% from 45 to 64, and 19.4% who were 65 years of age or older. The median age was 40 years. For every 100 females, there were 86.9 males. For every 100 females age 18 and over, there were 81.3 males.

The median income for a household in the city was $30,351, and the median income for a family was $41,816. Males had a median income of $35,347 versus $20,102 for females. The per capita income for the city was $16,810. About 6.9% of families and 11.1% of the population were below the poverty line, including 13.2% of those under age 18 and 8.6% of those age 65 or over.

== Industry ==
In its heyday, Manistee was home to a booming logging industry.

In the late 19th century, Manistee was one of the leading shingle manufacturing cities in the world, with over 30 shingle mills on the Manistee river at one time. During the lumber boom of the 1880s, Manistee was the headquarters of its own railroad, the Manistee and North-Eastern and had more millionaires per capita than anywhere else in the United States.

Manistee is also associated with the salt industry. Manistee is now the home of three factories on Lake Manistee; Packaging Corporation of America, Morton Salt, and Martin Marietta. For this reason, Manistee is known as the "Salt City". The town is also a local favorite for tourism and fishing.

== Media ==
Manistee is home to a radio station, WMTE-FM (101.5), and was previously home to the now-defunct WMTE (1340 AM). The Ludington Daily News, Manistee News Advocate and Traverse City Record-Eagle cover the Manistee area and distribute daily newspapers in the city.

Formerly distributing newspapers in Manistee included the Bear Lake Beacon, the Copemish Courier, the Manistee Advocate, the Manistee Daily Advocate (which became the Manistee News Advocate), the Manistee Daily News, the Manistee Democrat, and the Onekama Lake Breeze.

Manistee is home to 10 West Studios which produces full-length motion pictures. Notable movies include: What If..., starring Kevin Sorbo and John Ratzenberger filmed in Manistee, Jerusalem Countdown featuring Randy Travis, Stacy Keach and Lee Majors, Mickey Matson and the Copperhead Conspiracy starring Christopher Lloyd and Ernie Hudson, and God Bless the Broken Road starring Jordin Sparks and Lindsay Pulsipher

== Area activities ==
- Orchard Beach State Park is approximately 2 miles north of Manistee.
- Little River Casino Resort is approximately 5 miles northeast of Manistee.
- Manistee National Golf Resort is approximately 2 miles south of Manistee.
- Manistee Golf and Country Club was established in 1901 and is located within the city of Manistee.
- There are three public beaches, Fifth Avenue Beach with the small man-made lake next to Fifth Avenue Beach and First Street Beach, located respectively north and south of the harbor entrance on the shore of Lake Michigan.

== Local events and attractions ==
Manistee has museums, an opera house, and recurring events. These include:

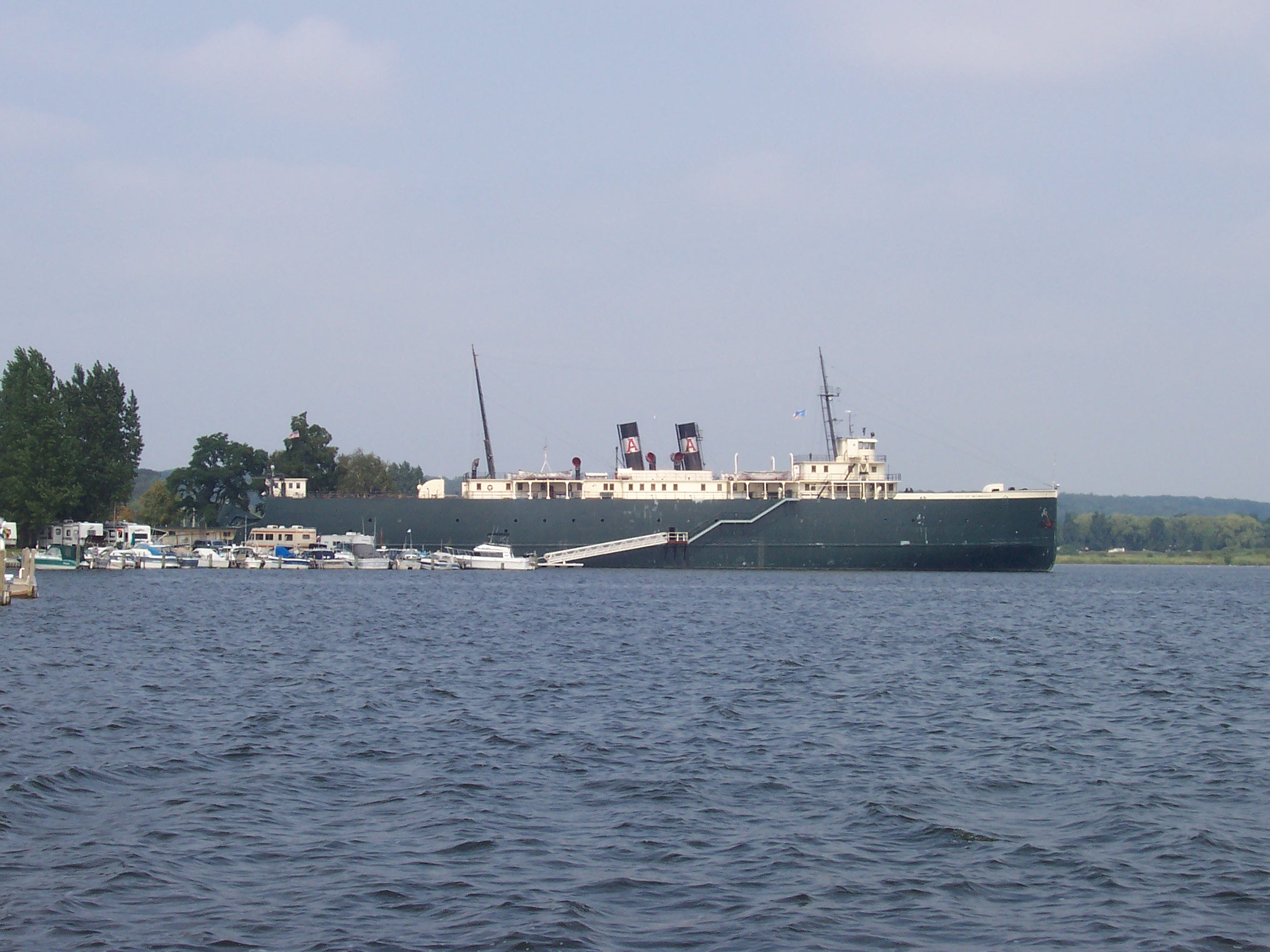
The SS City of Milwaukee, a retired railroad car ferry, in Manistee harbor

- Arcadia Area Historical Museum
- Armory Youth Project
- Brethren Heritage Museum
- Kaleva Bottle House Museum also known as the John J. Makinen Bottle House
- Kaleva Train Depot Museum
- Lake Bluff Bird Sanctuary (Michigan Audubon Society)
- Manistee Art Institute
- Manistee County Historical Museum
- Manistee Fire Hall
- Manistee National Forest Festival
- Marilla Historical Museum
- Our Savior's Historical Museum
- Ramsdell Theatre, home to the Manistee Civic Players. and the Manistee Art Institute.
- Riverwalk, 1.5 miles (2.4 km) of Victoriana and scenic river views.
- Page Road
- SS City of Milwaukee, a National Historic Landmark
- Victorian Manistee Tours
- Victorian Sleighbell Parade and Old Christmas Weekend
- Historic Vogue Theatre built in 1938, having Art Deco/Art Moderne design elements, and considered to be notable.
- Waterworks Building

== Retail ==
Manistee has a historic downtown with many original buildings from the Victorian era. The entire Downtown District is listed on the National Register of Historic Places. There are a good variety of retail stores in Manistee, many of which are locally owned and operated.

== Government and infrastructure ==
The Michigan Department of Corrections Oaks Correctional Facility is in Manistee Township, near Manistee.

== Recreation ==
- Over 40 charter fishing boats operate on Lake Michigan from Manistee County ports.
- Fishing in the Manistee River can yield salmon and steelhead.
- Because a large portion of the county is public land, hunting is popular.
- Filmmaker Michael Moore visited Manistee in February 2011 to support the restoration of the Vogue Theatre in downtown Manistee.

=== Sports ===
The Manistee Saints are a semi-professional baseball team that have called Manistee home since 1934. Their home games are at Rietz Park in Manistee. Formerly, the Manistee Colts and the Manistee Champs played in the Michigan State League, a minor league baseball league.

There are many golf courses located around the city of Manistee.

- Manistee National Golf and Resort
- Manistee Country Club
- Fox Hills Golf Course
- Wolf River Golf Park
- Fawn Crest Golf Course
- Arcadia Bluffs Golf Course
- Crystal Mountain
- Caberfae Peaks Ski & Golf Resort

There are also two ski resorts near the city of Manistee.

- Crystal Mountain (30 miles North)
- Caberfae Peaks Ski & Golf Resort (36 miles East)

There are many disc golf courses, mountain biking trails, and hiking trails all over Manistee County and in the city of Manistee.

== Schools ==
=== Currently operating ===
Elementary

- James Madison Elementary (DayCare, Pre-School, K), Manistee Area Public Schools
- Manistee Elementary School (Location of Former Middle School and John F. Kennedy Elementary School) (1-5), Manistee Area Public Schools
- Trinity Lutheran School (K-8), Lutheran Church – Missouri Synod Private School

Secondary

- Casman Alternative Academy (7-12), Provides an alternative education for those in Manistee County and surrounding areas.
- Manistee Middle/High School (6-12), Manistee Area Public Schools, Class B/Division 3; Division 5 (Football) in sports

=== Formerly operating ===
Elementary Jefferson Elementary School K-6

- George Washington Elementary (K-6), Manistee Area Public Schools
- Abraham Lincoln Elementary (K-6), Manistee Area Public Schools
- John F. Kennedy Elementary (Parkdale Location) (4-6), Manistee Area Public Schools
- John F. Kennedy Elementary (Location of Former Middle School) (3-5), Manistee Area Public Schools
- Woodrow Wilson Elementary (k-6), Manistee Area Public Schools (also known as Central Elementary School, was the site of the Manistee High School up until the 1927 building was finished)

Secondary

- Guardian Angels Schools (7-12), Catholic Church School
- St. Joseph Schools (K-12), Catholic Church School
- Newland Academy (6-12), School (Type Unknown) (formerly "Lake Bluff Academy")
- Union School (8-12), School (also known as Grant School)

All grades

Manistee Catholic Central School (K-12), Roman Catholic private school, Class D/Division 4; Division 8 (Football)

one room/country schools

- Tomaszewski Country School (K-8), School (One Room Country School)Closed 1959/60 Students moved to Parkdale School
- Ayres school (k-8), one room country school, closed in the 1960s when new elementary school was completed
- Stronach School (k-8) two-story country school for the small town of Stronach, closed in the 1960s when the Manistee ISD consolidated
- Eastlake School (k-8) two-story country school for the small town of Stronach, closed in the 1960s when the Manistee ISD consolidated
- ward schools - a set of four wooden schoolhouses used up until the newer elementary schools were completed. many of the ward schools were renamed after presidents and were later replaced by buildings with the same name (Fourth ward was also known as Lincoln School, after Lincoln Elementary was completed, Fourth ward was closed) two of these ward schools still stand, Washington and Lincoln.

== Transportation ==
- Manistee is served by Manistee County Blacker Airport (IATA: MBL, ICAO: KMBL, FAA LID: MBL), approximately three miles (4.8 km) northeast of the city. Starting in May 2012, Cape Air offered non-stop scheduled flights to and from Chicago Midway International Airport. By 2023, Cape Air was flying out of Chicago’s O’Hare, and had codesharing or interline agreements with other carriers including American and United.
- US 31 / LMCT traverses the heart of Manistee, running southerly toward Scottville and Muskegon and northerly toward Bear Lake and Traverse City.
- M-22 / LMCT begins five miles (8.0 km) northeast of Manistee
- M-55 begins one mile (1.6 km) northeast of Manistee and proceeds easterly across the Lower Peninsula to Tawas City.
- M-110 is a former state trunkline that used to run from US 31 on the city line of Manistee and Parkdale within Manistee Township to Orchard State Park. It was decommissioned in 2003.
- Great Lakes Central Railroad provides rail service to industries in Manistee.

== Notable people ==
- Robert R. Blacker, Canadian-born politician and lumber baron
- Dave Campbell, baseball player and sportscaster
- Byron M. Cutcheon, Civil War veteran and winner of the Medal of Honor, congressman, attorney, and postmaster
- Fred W. Green, governor of Michigan, 1927–1931
- Nels Johnson and his business of Century tower clocks
- James Earl Jones, actor; first began acting at the Ramsdell Theatre in Manistee
- Edward Kozlowski, Polish American priest, later Bishop of Milwaukee
- Michael J. Malik Sr., developer
- Harry W. Musselwhite, politician and newspaper publisher
- Harriet Quimby, first licensed American woman aviator; born in nearby Arcadia Township
- Olaf Swenson, fur trader, adventurer, and author
- George W. Tennant, cook, Antarctic explorer
- Toni Trucks, actor; first began acting at the Ramsdell Theatre in Manistee
- Robert Pershing Wadlow, the world's tallest man in medical history; died at the Hotel Chippewa in Manistee on July 15, 1940
- Kienan Robert Kowalski; internet personality known for his calm, stable, gentle nature and former Manistee Chippewas hockey player

== See also ==
- House of Flavors
