= Vogue Theatre (Michigan) =

Movie theater in Manistee, Michigan, United States

Coordinates: 44°14′51″N 86°19′22″W

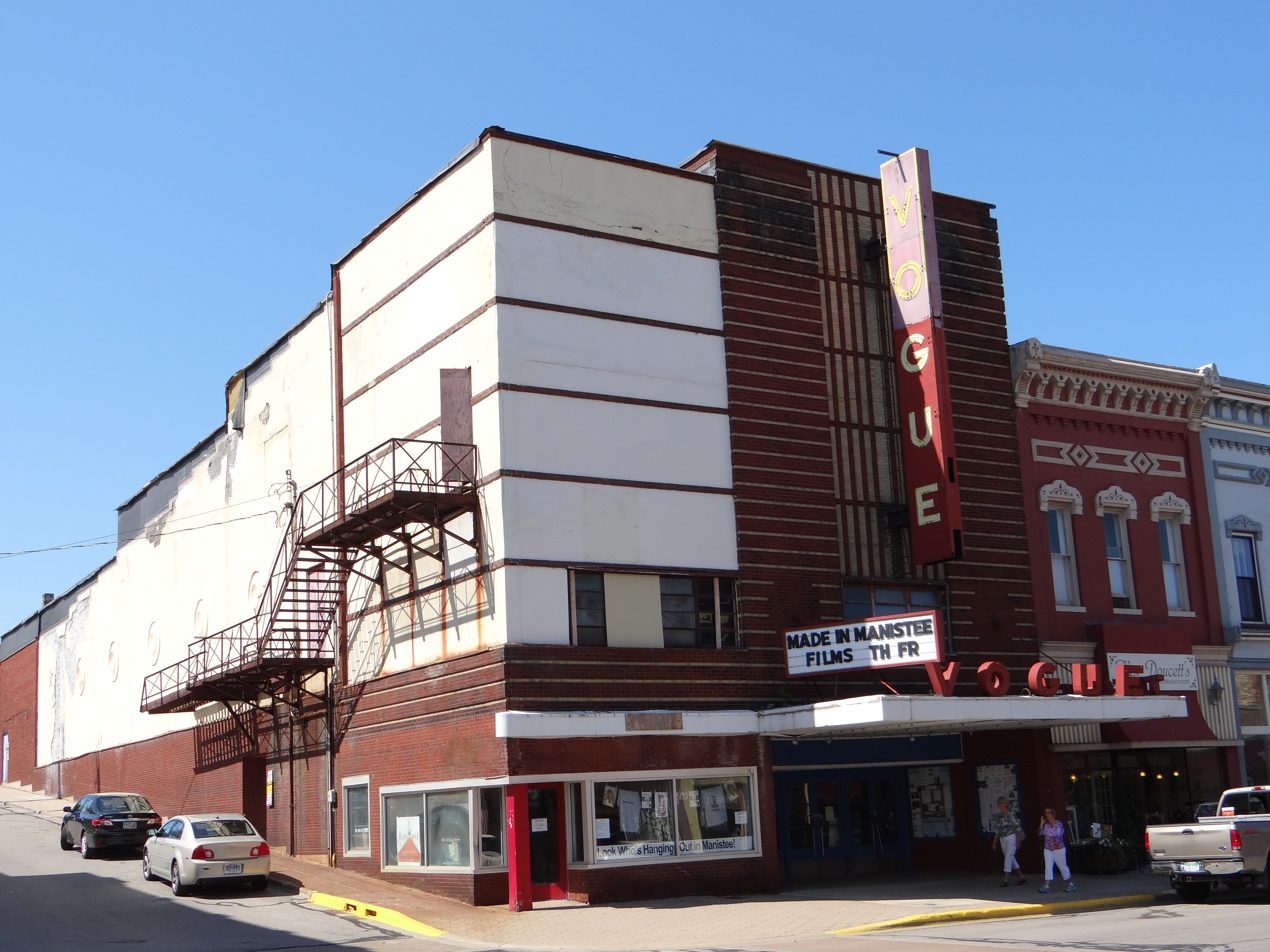
The Vogue Theatre in 2012

The Vogue Theatre is a movie theater in Manistee, Michigan. It was built in 1938, closed in 2006, and reopened to the public in 2013 after a fundraising effort to refurbish the historic building.

The Vogue Theatre (Michigan) was selected Red Hot Best 2016 Winner for Northern Michigan small town movie theater.
