= Amethyst Theatre =

Historical movie theater in McAdam, New Brunswick

Coordinates: 45.59517°N 67.3281°W

- Interactive map of Amethyst Theatre
- Former names: Vogue Theatre
- Address: 10 Lake Avenue
- Location: McAdam, New Brunswick
- Type: Indoor theatre

Construction
- Renovated: 2010
- Demolished: 2019

Website
- amethysttheatre.com

The Amethyst Theatre formerly and perhaps better known as the Vogue Theatre is a historical movie theatre located in McAdam, New Brunswick. The theatre which is considered one of New Brunswick's classic theatres saw its peak during the early-mid 20th century. However, events such as a fire during Hurricane Edna in 1954, vandalism, and neglect have seen the building fall into disrepair. In 2010 the theatre was purchased by a new owner who began renovations to restore the theatre and provide a new cultural outlet for the village. The most watched film in the theater was The Sound of Music back in 1965.
