= M-111 (Michigan highway) =

M-111 was the designation given to two former state trunklines in the U.S. state of Michigan:

- M-111 (1928 Michigan highway) in the Bay City area
- M-111 (1938 Michigan highway) in Keweenaw County

Browse numbered routes
← M-110	MI	→ US 112
