= Little Manistee River =

Location
- Country: United States

Physical characteristics
- Source
  - location: Michigan
- Mouth
  - location: 44°12′42″N 86°16′40″W

The Little Manistee River is a 64.6-mile-long (104.0 km) tributary of the Manistee River in Michigan. It rises in the southeast corner of Ellsworth Township in Lake County and flows west-northwest to its mouth at the southeast end of Manistee Lake in Manistee County.

== See also ==
- List of rivers of Michigan
