= Adam Stronach =

English Christian missionary in the U.S.

Adam Stronach was an English Christian missionary who opened a settlement in Manistee County, in the U.S. state of Michigan. The settlement was first called "Paggeotville" and was renamed Stronach, when Stronach and his brother John built a sawmill in 1841. David Stronach and his son Adam Stronach arrived to the area in a schooner through the Manistee River.
