= Manistee Lake (Manistee County, Michigan) =

Lake in the state of Michigan, United States

- Location within Michigan Location within the United States
- Location: Manistee County, Michigan
- Coordinates: 44°14′16″N 86°18′12″W
- Primary inflows: Little Manistee River; Manistee River
- Primary outflows: Manistee River
- Surface elevation: 581 ft (177 m)
- Settlements: Eastlake, Manistee

Manistee Lake is a water body adjacent to the city of Manistee, Michigan. Its primary inlet, as well as its outlet, is the Manistee River, flowing to Lake Michigan. The tributary Little Manistee River enters the southeast end of the lake before the outlet.

== See also ==
- List of lakes in Michigan
