= Great Lakes passenger steamers =

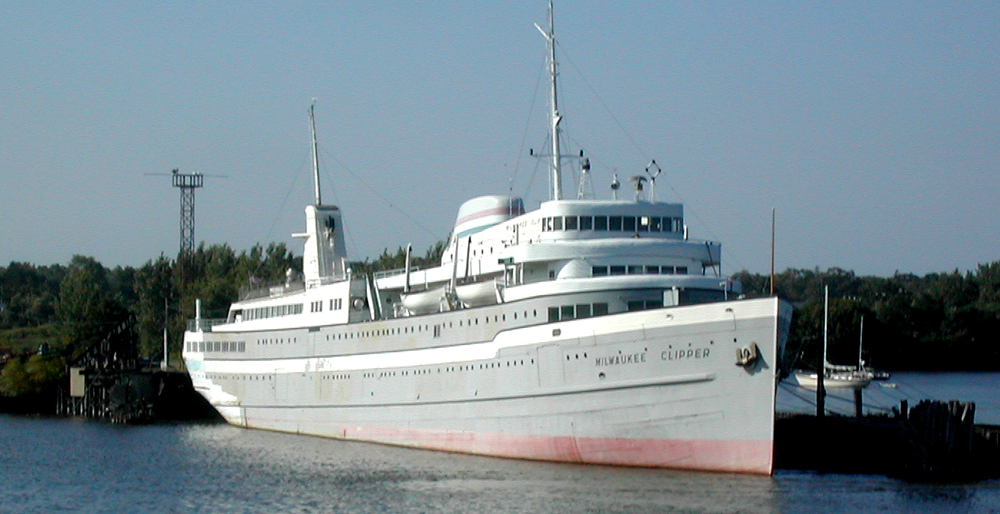
SS Milwaukee Clipper

The history of commercial passenger shipping on the Great Lakes is long but uneven. It reached its zenith between the mid-19th century and the 1950s. As early as 1844, palace steamers carried passengers and cargo around the Great Lakes. By 1900, fleets of relatively luxurious passenger steamers plied the waters of the lower lakes, especially the major industrial centres of Chicago, Milwaukee, Detroit, Cleveland, Buffalo, and Toronto.

== History ==
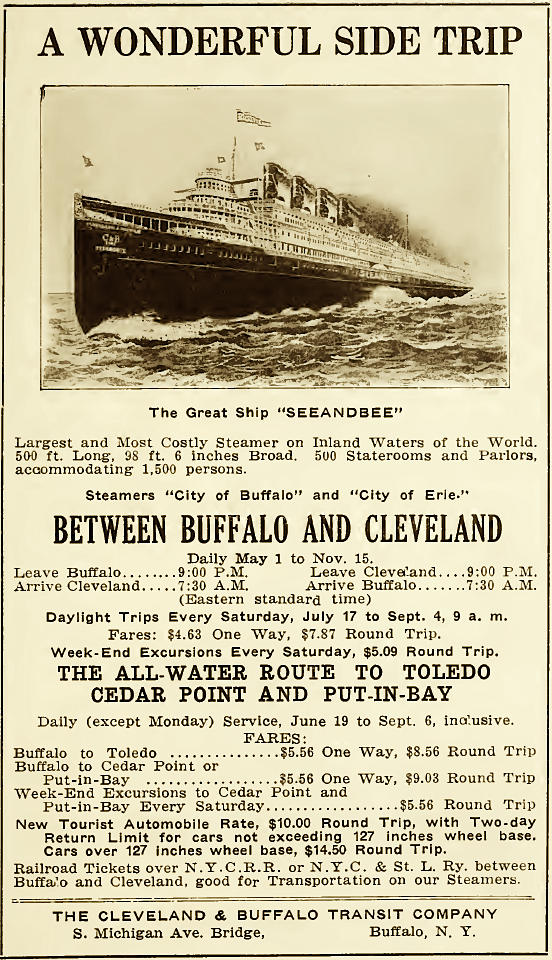
Seeandbee, launched in 1912

The first steamboat on the Great Lakes depends on definition. The Canadian-built Frontenac (170 feet, 52 m), was launched on September 7, 1816, at Ernestown, Ontario (about 18 miles (29 km) from Kingston). The U.S.-built Ontario (110 feet, 34 m), launched in the spring of 1817 at Sacketts Harbor, New York, began its regular service in April 1817 before Frontenac made its first trip to the head of the lake on June 5.

The first steamboat on the upper Great Lakes was the passenger-carrying Walk-in-the-water, built in 1818 to navigate Lake Erie. It was a success and more vessels like it followed. Steamboats on the lakes grew in size and number, and additional decks were built on the superstructure to allow more capacity. This inexpensive method of adding capacity was adapted from river steamboats and successfully applied to lake-going craft.

The Erie Canal opened in 1825, allowing settlers from New England and New York to reach Michigan by water through Albany and Buffalo. This route opening and the incorporation of Chicago, Illinois in 1837, increased Great Lakes steamboat traffic from Detroit through the Straits of Mackinac to Chicago.

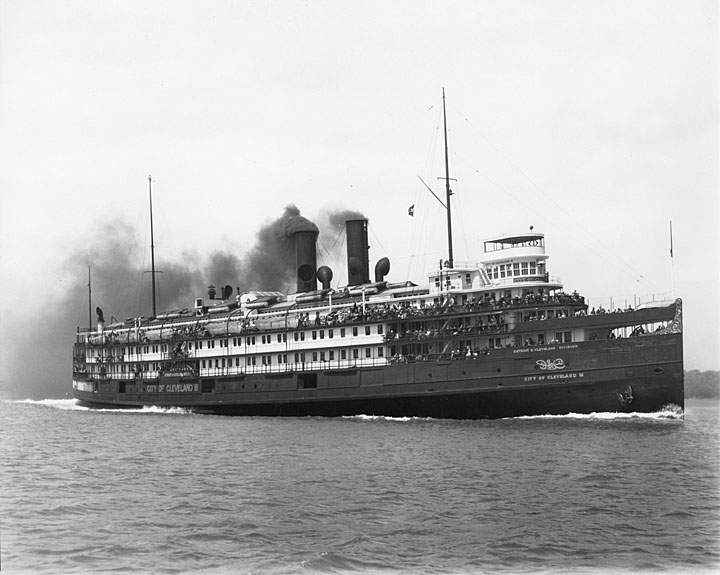
City of Cleveland (circa 1941)

The screw propeller was introduced to the Great Lakes by Vandalia in 1842 and allowed the building of a new class of combination passenger and freight carrier. The first of these "package and passenger freighters", Hercules, was built in Buffalo in 1843. Hercules displayed all the features that defined the type, a screw propelled the vessel, passengers were accommodated in staterooms on the upper deck, and package freight below on the large main deck and in the holds.

Engines developed as well. Compound engines, in which steam was expanded twice for greater efficiency, were first used on the Great Lakes in 1869. Triple-expansion engines, for even greater efficiency, were introduced in 1887 and quadruple-expansion engines, the ultimate type of reciprocating engine for speed, power and efficiency, appeared on the lakes in 1894.

Steamboat lines were established by railroads on the Great lakes to join railheads in the 1850s. This service carried goods and passengers from railroads in the East across the length of the lakes to railroads for the journey West. Railroads bought and built steamship lines to complement railroad services. One such railroad-owned steamship line was formed by the Pennsylvania Railroad in 1865 to connect their terminals at Buffalo to those of the Northern Pacific Railroad at Duluth, Minnesota. This new line, owned by the Erie and Western Transportation Co., became the well-known Anchor Line. The Northern Pacific started its own Northern Steamship Company which, from the mid-1890s, operated the steamers, North Land and North West on 7-day round trip cruises between Buffalo to Duluth. Travelers could disembark at several points and were allowed to finish their voyage later in the season.

A significant industry in leisure cruising arose beginning in the late 19th century, providing large passenger vessels for travel to summer resorts and hotels in the north woods, away from the polluted cities. Summer hotels such as the Grand Hotel on Mackinac Island and Ottawa Beach near Holland, Michigan as well as cottage resorts like Harbor Beach and Petoskey, Michigan had regular steamship service. The passenger steamers were also used as charters for day trips. Infamous among these are Lady Elgin which sank in 1861 with 300 lives lost, Eastland, which capsized in the Chicago River in 1915 with the loss of 844 lives, and Noronic, which burned at the wharf in Toronto, Ontario in September 1949 with the loss of 119 lives. While the ship had been known as the "Queen of the Great Lakes" it is now also a symbol of the end of passenger cruises on the Great Lakes. SS North American and SS South American would continue to sail until 1967 when South American made a final run delivering passengers to the 1967 World's Fair in Montreal, Quebec.

In 1915, the anti-monopoly provisions of section 11 of the Panama Canal Act of 1912, ch. 390, 37 Stat. 560, 566 (August 24, 1912), which prohibited railroads under most circumstances from owning steamships, went into effect. As a result, railroad-owned company fleets were sold to buyers with no ownership interest in railways because under the new law railroads had to divest themselves of their marine divisions on the lakes. Under this divestiture law, Milwaukee Clipper, for instance, was sold by the Anchor Line along with four other railroad-owned company fleets to the newly formed Great Lakes Transit Corporation. Under this flag, Milwaukee Clipper carried passengers along her old route until retired in 1970.

== Resort traffic ==
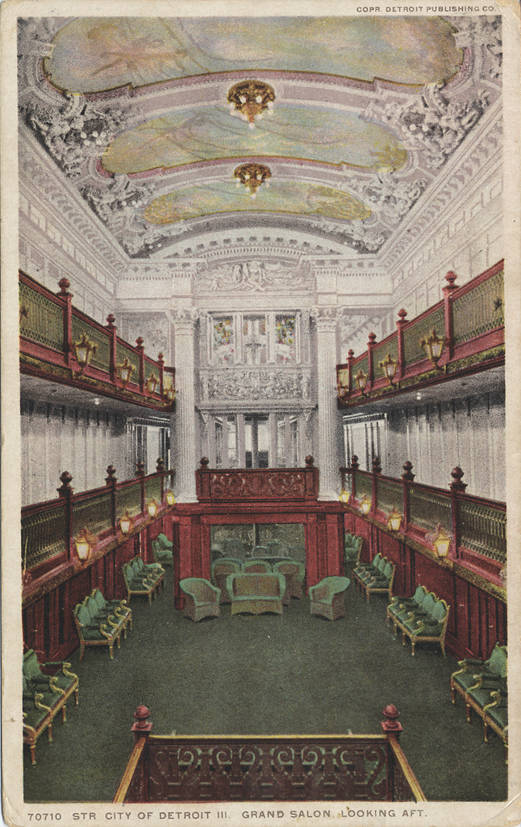
Grand Salon, City of Detroit III

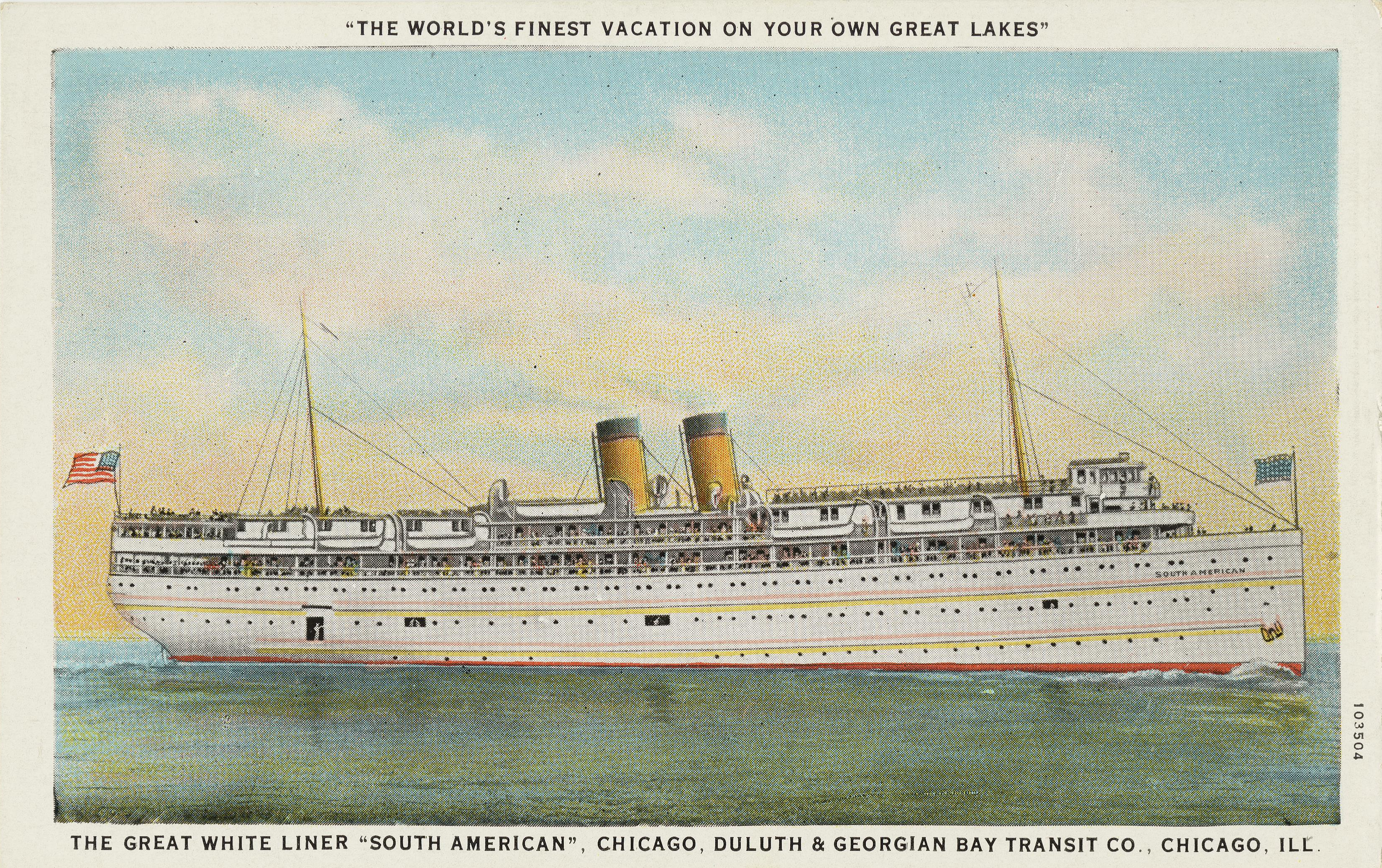
SS South American, built in 1913, remained in service until 1967

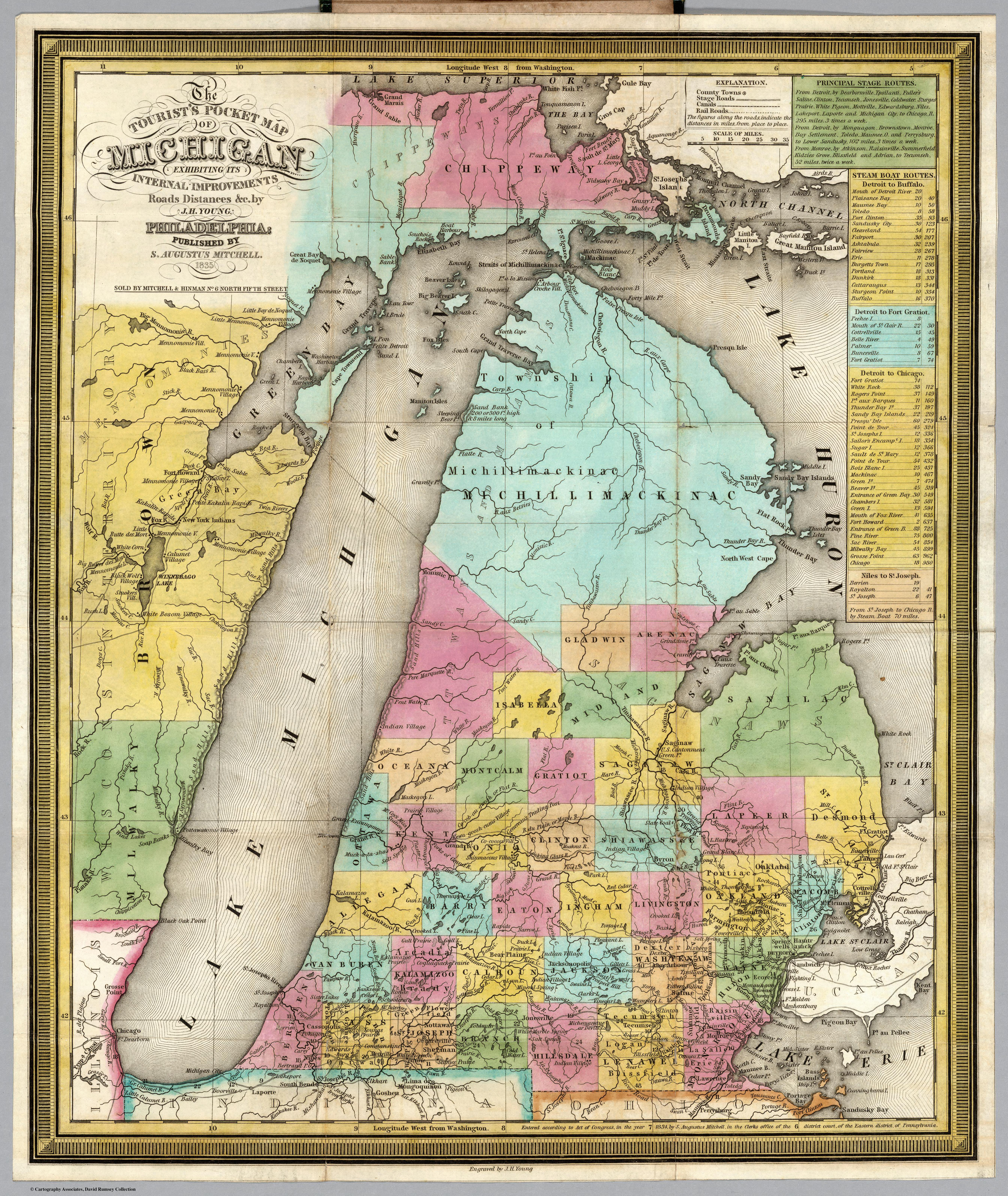
This inset from the 1835 Tourist's Pocket Map Of Michigan shows steam boat routes from Detroit to Buffalo, Detroit to Fort Gratiot, Detroit to Chicago via Michilimackinac, and Niles to St Joseph.

Before trains and, later, cars became prevalent, summer vacation areas in more remote areas around the Great Lakes were accessible primarily only by steamer. Northern Michigan's tourist and resort areas began to grow in this manner in the late 1890s.

In the late 19th century, many early tourists arrived at Northern Michigan resort areas via a Lake Michigan steamship. Chicago to Harbor Springs, Michigan, was a popular trip for many passengers. Manitou would make the trip in 24 hours. In 1898, the fare was $5.00, with meals and berth extra. Two other popular ships were Petoskey and Charlevoix; their time to Harbor Springs was 40 hours. The cost to take these boats in 1898 was $7.00, with meals and berth included. Early steamships stopped at Harbor Springs due to its naturally protected and very deep harbor; later, they added a stop in Petoskey.

During the period between 1910 and 1931, crowds would gather at the Glen Haven docks on Saturdays and Sundays. Motorcoaches awaited newly arriving resort guests while many summer home residents rode to the docks to meet husbands or fathers arriving from the Chicago area. "They leave Chicago Friday night," explained a tourist publication, "and get here the next morning; first stop. They're with their families until Sunday night when the boat takes 'em back again, ready for the job. Great for 'em!"

The author Ernest Hemingway spent the majority of his first 22 summers in Northern Michigan, around Petoskey. He often traveled by steamer from Chicago to Harbor Springs, a voyage that would take 32 hours.

Major lines on the Great Lakes included the Detroit and Cleveland Navigation Company in the U.S., and in Canada, the Northern Navigation Company (later absorbed by Canada Steamship Lines). Some were affiliated with railway companies such as the Ann Arbor Railroad, the Grand Trunk Railway, and the Pere Marquette Railway (absorbed in 1947 into the Chesapeake & Ohio Railway). On Georgian Bay and Lake Huron, the ships of the Owen Sound Transportation Company have shuttled passengers since 1921.

== Current service ==
Since the 1950s, leisure cruises have given way to ferry services on the Great Lakes, transporting people and vehicles to and from various islands. These include Isle Royale, Pelée Island, Mackinac Island, Beaver Island, Bois Blanc Island (Michigan), Bois Blanc Island (Ontario), Kelleys Island, South Bass Island, North Manitou Island, South Manitou Island, Harsens Island, the Toronto Islands. Well-known among these is Chi-Cheemaun linking Tobermory (Ontario) with the largest freshwater island in the world, Manitoulin Island.

Car ferry services also link Ludington, Michigan with Manitowoc, Wisconsin (operated by SS Badger, the last coal-fired steam ship operating on the Great Lakes) and a high-speed catamaran running between Milwaukee, Wisconsin and Muskegon, Michigan. An international ferry ran on Lake Ontario from Rochester, New York to Toronto from 2004 to 2005, but it was plagued with high operating costs and low demand. The privately owned company was taken over by the city administration of Rochester, and the ship was sold overseas where it operated across the Strait of Gibraltar.

Cruise ship traffic on the Great Lakes increased in the early-21st century, with ships like MS Hamburg, MS Saint Laurent and the smaller ships of the Great Lakes Cruise Company offering multi-day trips.

=== Some passenger steamers ===
Ship's Name	Year built	Nationality	Ship's Name	Year built	Nationality	Ship's Name	Year built	Nationality
Niagara	1856	United States	SS Christopher Columbus	1892	United States	PS Lady Elgin	1851	United States
Milwaukee Clipper	1904	United States	SS Keewatin	1907	Canadian	Comet	1875	United States
SS City of Milwaukee	1931	United States	City of Detroit III	1911	United States	SS City of Erie	1898	United States
SS South American	1913	United States	SS Eastland	1902	United States	Tashmoo	1899	United States
SS North American	1913	United States	SS Canadiana	1910	Canadian	SS Alabama	1909	United States
Tionesta	1903	United States	Octoraro	1910	United States	Manitou	1893	United States

City of Alpena (circa 1921)

== See also ==
- Ferries in Michigan
- Lake steamers of North America
