= SS Greater Detroit =

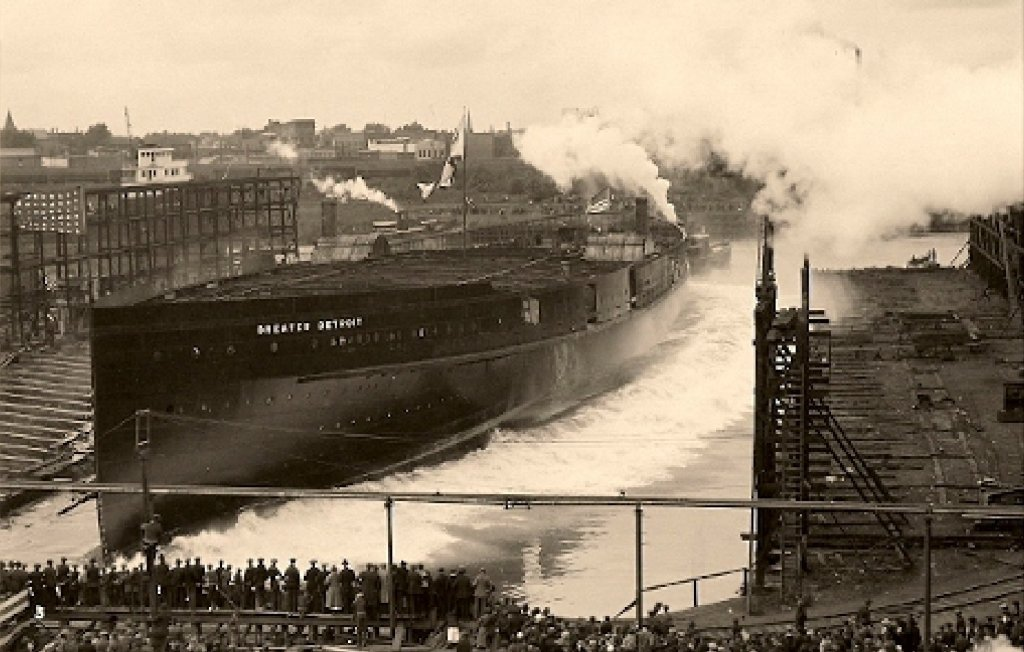
- The launching of SS Greater Detroit on September 15, 1923.

History

United States
- Name: SS Greater Detroit
- Owner: Detroit and Cleveland Navigation Company
- Operator: Detroit and Cleveland Navigation Company
- Route: Detroit, Michigan to Buffalo, New York
- Builder: American Ship Building Company
- Cost: $3.5 million
- Launched: September 15, 1923
- Maiden voyage: August 24, 1924
- In service: 1924
- Out of service: 1950
- Identification: 223664
- Fate: Burned and sold for scrap in 1956.

General characteristics
- Type: Sidewheel steamer
- Tonnage: 7,739 GRT
- Length: 536 ft (163.4 m)
- Beam: 96 ft (29.3 m)
- Depth: 21.25 ft (6.48 m)
- Decks: 7
- Installed power: 10,000 hp (7,500 kW) Corliss Engine (Converted to oil in 1949)
- Propulsion: Sidewheel
- Speed: 21 knots (39 km/h; 24 mph)
- Capacity: 2,127 passengers; 103 automobiles
- Crew: 300

SS Greater Detroit was a sidewheel steamer on Lake Erie that was launched in 1923. It was operated by the Detroit and Cleveland Navigation Company and carried passengers between Detroit, Michigan and Buffalo, New York. Greater Detroit and her sister ship, SS Greater Buffalo, were the largest and most expensive sidewheel steamers in the world at the time of their launching, and were capable of transporting more passengers than many oceangoing liners of the time. They were renowned for their onboard luxury, decor and modern amenities. Nicknamed the "Leviathan of the Great Lakes", Greater Detroit was in passenger service for 26 years until 1950, when she became too expensive to continue to operate. The ship was sold for scrap in 1956.

== History ==
After World War I, the Detroit and Cleveland Navigation Company was interested in expanding its presence on its passenger and freight route between Detroit, Michigan, and Buffalo, New York. In 1922 they were approached by Frank E. Kirby, a noted ship architect at the time, who proposed a new ship design for the world's largest paddlewheel steamers. The company accepted the design and commissioned two, Greater Detroit and her sister ship Greater Buffalo, to be built by the American Ship Building Company at their shipyards in Lorain, Ohio. The hull of Greater Detroit was launched on September 15, 1923, and was then towed to the American Shipbuilding Company yard in Detroit to be fitted with its numerous decks and an ornate wooden interior. After almost a year of this work Greater Detroit began service on August 24, 1924, sailing overnight from Detroit to Buffalo.

The ships were outfitted with the most powerful paddle engines ever built – Corliss steam engines capable of producing 10,000 horsepower (7,500 kW) and propelling the ship at speeds of up to 21 knots (39 km/h; 24 mph). The ship's paddlewheel and bow rudder also helped the ship navigate the narrow rivers and harbors common on the Great Lakes.

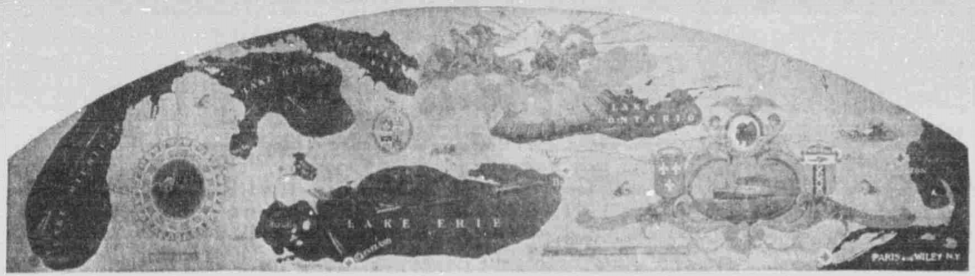
A mural from the ship depicting the Detroit and Cleveland Navigation Company's routes

The ship boasted numerous modern luxuries, including distilled water, air conditioning, movie theaters, and wireless equipment for communication. Large promenades and smoking rooms boasted impressive views of the ship's surroundings. Its 625 staterooms could carry over 2,000 passengers, and its dining room could seat 375 for full service dinner and breakfast service. Its modern decor was widely praised and included numerous frescoes and murals depicting the maritime and cultural history of the Great Lakes; company advertising from the period proclaimed it was "the last word in marine architecture." It was also equipped with numerous safety features including a double bottom hull, 16 watertight compartments, and sprinklers in every room to combat fire. The ship was renowned for its luxury and catered to mostly wealthy travelers. Greater Detroit sailed overnight from Detroit to Buffalo, making its return trip over the same night. Greater Buffalo was based in Buffalo and conducted this service in reverse.

While initially extremely popular, the ship struggled to operate during the Great Depression. Labor strikes and its resource-intensive coal engines increased operating costs, while increasing competition from railroads and the automobile, as well as the wider economic depression, sapped demand for its services. The vessel's large size proved to be a liability as it was too wide to pass through the Sault St. Marie Canal to Lake Superior or the Welland Canal to Lake Ontario, confining it to Lake Erie. Losses for the ship continued to mount (its sister ship Greater Buffalo lost over $2,000,000 (around $31,700,000 in 2020) from 1931 – August 1942) and it was mothballed for the 1938 season.

The entry of the United States into World War II brought some relief as gas rationing caused many to use the ship for travel as well as recreation. The war also brought trials for the company, as Greater Detroit's sister ship, Greater Buffalo, was requisitioned for use by the navy, converted to a training aircraft carrier, and renamed USS Sable. Although this brought some badly needed cash to the company, it also caused logistical issues as the previous daily round trip service could no longer be conducted. This prompted another D&C ship, City of Detroit III, to be reassigned to the Detroit-Buffalo route.

== End of service ==
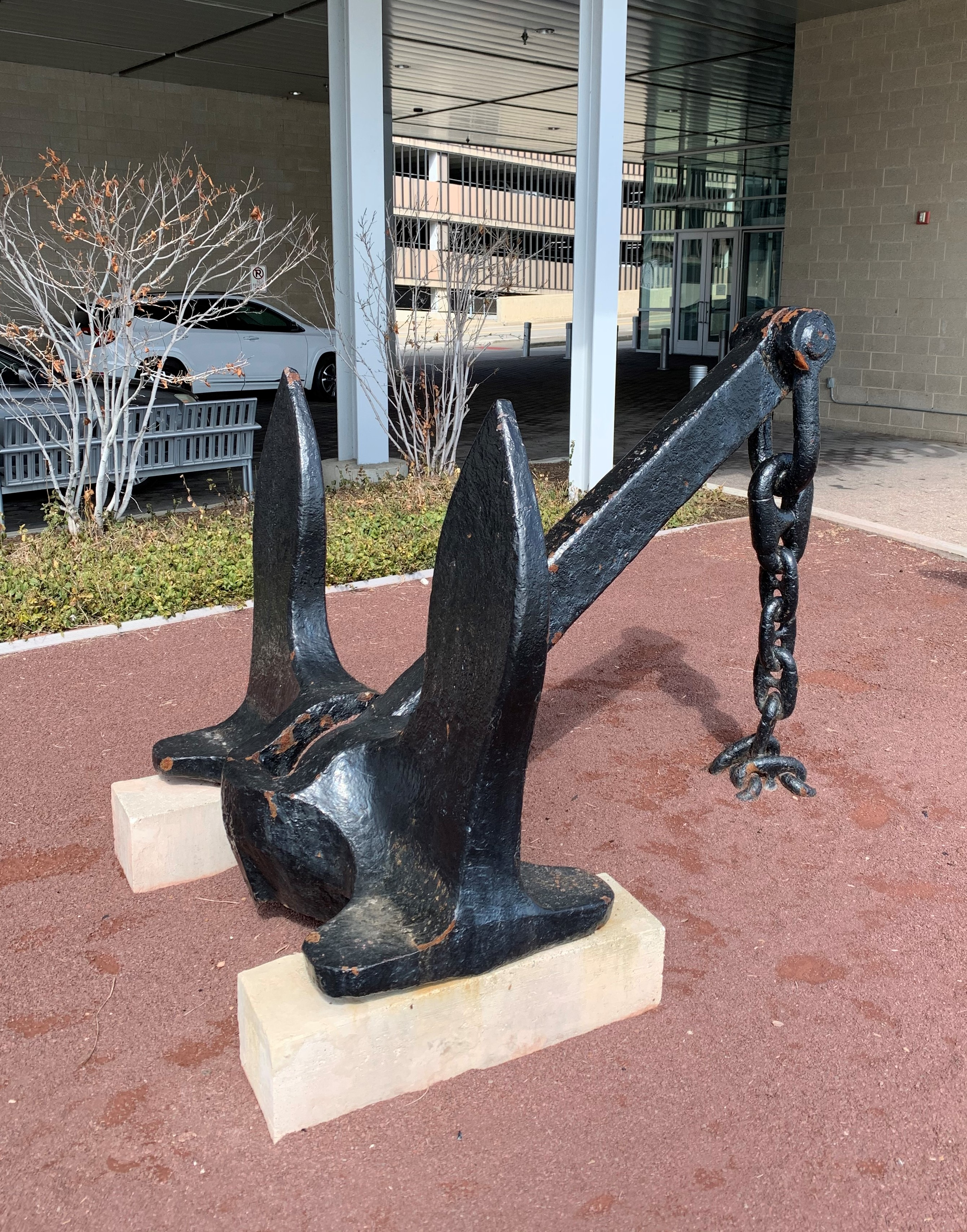
The anchor of SS Greater Detroit, on display outside the Port of Detroit.

Rising labor costs and competition from the automobile made the ship's post World War II future uncertain. In an effort to make the ship more economical to operate and reduce pollution, the ship's coal boilers were replaced with six oil burning marine engines in 1949. In 1950 the ship was also repainted white to underscore the cleanliness of the refitted vessel. These changes were ultimately in vain, as the ship was removed from service in the fall of 1950. In 1951 Greater Detroit was finally retired. The ship sat unused until 1956 when it was sold for scrap. The interior fittings were sold as souvenirs to area residents, and on December 12, 1956 the ship was towed out onto Lake St. Clair and lit on fire to remove all wooden elements of the superstructure and make scrapping easier. Without steam power the 6,000 lb (2,700 kg) anchor was unable to be raised and was instead cut, resting on the bottom of the Detroit River for almost 60 years. The hull was then towed to Hamilton, Ontario and was scrapped by the Steel Company of Canada.

On November 15, 2016, the anchor was recovered by a team of divers from the Great Lakes Maritime Institute. It is currently on display outside the Detroit/Wayne County Port Authority Office in downtown Detroit.

== See also ==
- Great Lakes passenger steamers
