= SS Alabama =

Scrapped American steamship

History

United States
- Name: Alabama
- Builder: Manitowoc Shipbuilding Company, Manitowoc, Wisconsin
- Yard number: 36
- Launched: December 18, 1909
- Out of service: 1946
- Fate: Converted to non-powered barge, 1961; Scrapped, 2006

General characteristics
- Type: Great Lakes passenger steamer
- Tonnage: 2,626 GRT; 1,684 NRT
- Length: 275 ft (84 m) o/a
- Beam: 44 ft 6 in (13.56 m)
- Depth: 17 ft 1 in (5.21 m)
- Propulsion: 2,000 ihp (1,491 kW) triple expansion steam engine; 3 coal-fired Scotch boilers

SS Alabama was a steamship that served on the Great Lakes.

== Construction ==
Alabama was built by the Manitowoc Shipbuilding Company at Manitowoc, Wisconsin, in 1909. She was 275 ft (84 m) in length, had a 46 ft (14 m), 6 in (15 cm) beam, and drew 17 ft 1 in (5.21 m) She was equipped with a 2,200 horsepower quadruple expansion steam engine and a three coal-burning Scotch marine boilers.

== Owners ==
Alabama's first owner was the Goodrich Transit Company.

After Goodrich Transit went bankrupt in 1933 she joined the Chicago, Duluth and Georgian Bay Transit Company, which also owned the SS North American and SS South American.

In 1946, the Georgian Bay Line sold Alabama for conversion to barge service. She was moved to Detroit's Rouge River where her passenger cabins were removed and her hull renovated for use as a cargo barge to haul scrap metal.

Purchased in 2005 by Dean Construction, she was towed to LaSalle, Ontario, Canada, that October, and was later scrapped.
