= Detroit and Cleveland Navigation Company =

Great Lakes shipping company

Detroit and Cleveland Navigation Company, often abbreviated as D&C, was a shipping company on the Great Lakes.

House flag used by D&C

== Operations ==
The main route was between Detroit, Michigan, and Cleveland, Ohio. Routes also lead to Buffalo, New York with the purchase of the Detroit and Buffalo Steamship Company in 1909. Charters and day-trips were also offered. Most scheduled sailings were overnight sailings, landing in the morning after departure. Each ship was painted with a black hull and white superstructure and white lettering. By 1949, the ships wore all-white paint with blue lettering. The popular line operated from 1868 to 1951 and is often referred to as the owner of many of the Great Lakes' best "floating palaces" and "honeymoon ships".

== History ==
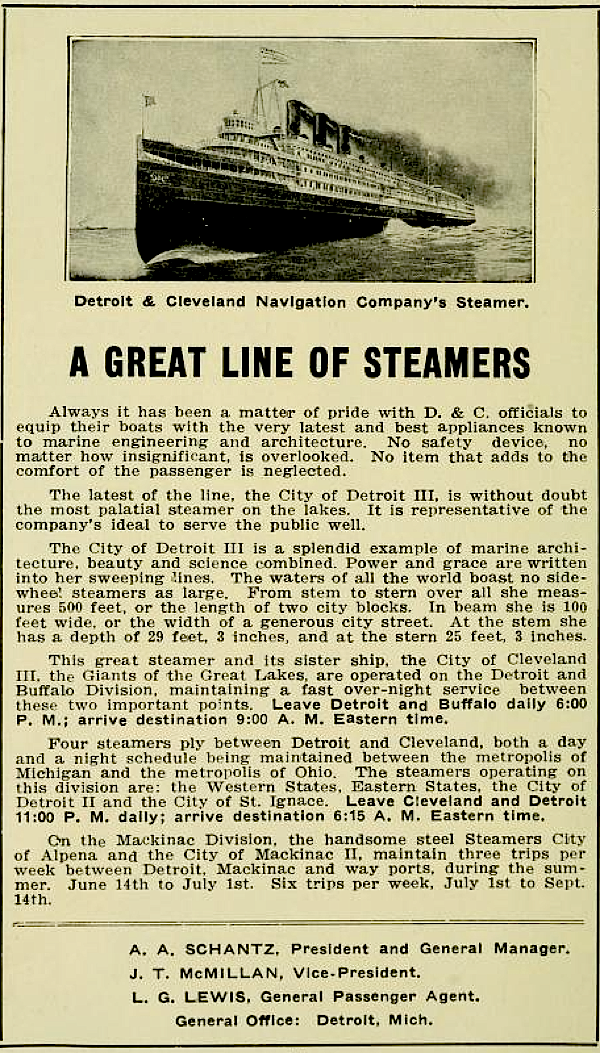
1920 Detroit and Cleveland Navigation Company advertisement.

In its heyday, the D&C Line was among the most well-known shipping companies in business on the Great Lakes, with its vessels being among the largest and most palatial ever seen. Two of them, SS Greater Buffalo and the SS Greater Detroit, were both built in 1923, and were known as the largest side-wheeler passenger ships in the world. Naval architect Frank E. Kirby designed many D&C ships. As ferry and cruise ships, all of the ships of D&C were a success, with various civic groups and companies often chartering each ship on account of their reputations for excellent services and good cuisine. Upon reaching Buffalo, happy honeymoon couples would connect to Niagara Falls. In the late 1930s, the increasing use of the automobile caused passenger numbers to slowly fall.

During World War II, Greater Buffalo was converted into training aircraft carriers for use on the Great Lakes. In the meantime, Greater Detroit and her fleetmates saw an increase in passenger revenues, with the ships being reasonably full as Americans rationed gasoline for the war effort and therefore chose to travel between cites on the D&C liners, among other lines operating then.

By the end of the war, revenues fell again. Greater Detroit and her fleetmates, the City of Cleveland III, City of Detroit III, Western States, and the Eastern States, were all that remained. On June 26, 1950, the 390-foot (120 m)-long City of Cleveland III was struck abaft by the Norwegian freighter Ravenfjell, and was severely damaged. Five passengers were killed in the collision, with dozens injured. The two ships survived and returned to their ports, but this incident, along with the dramatic resurgence of the automobile and truck traffic trades, finished the company. The company was formally dissolved in 1951, shortly after their old harbor terminals were condemned by the city of Detroit because of old age, and by 1959, most of the line's remaining ships had been scrapped. Greater Detroit and Eastern States in particular had their wooden upper works set afire before their steel hulls were scrapped at the Steel Company of Canada.

Western States, after finding herself laid up by 1951, was towed to Tawas City, Michigan on Lake Huron in 1955 to become a floating hotel. Overniter Inc. was her owner and the vessel was unofficially renamed Overniter. When the "flotel" idea proved to be unprofitable, Siegel Iron & Metal Company of Detroit purchased her. After a dockside fire in 1959, she was scrapped by Michigan-based Bay City Scrap Company at the old Davidson Shipyard.

Greater Buffalo was declared surplus by the United States Navy and scrapped in 1948.

One vessel built in 1883, the 203-foot (62 m) long, 807 ton City of Mackinac (renamed State of New York in 1893 by the Cleveland and Buffalo Line) was sold back to D&C in 1909. The City of Mackinac was later converted into the floating clubhouse of the Chicago Yacht Club (from 1936 to 2004) and was the last known vessel of the D&C Line to survive.

== The line today ==
When the City of Detroit III was dismantled in 1956, Frank Schmidt bought the wooden fittings from the Gothic Room aboard the steamer and had the material shipped to suburban Cleveland. After his death, the Dossin Great Lakes Museum on Belle Isle in the Detroit River acquired the woodwork and a part of the large and elegant room was preserved there as a reminder of the D&C Line's past glory days.

It was not until the arrival of the German HAPAG ship c. Columbus in 1997 that such large and well-accommodated overnight passengers ships had been seen on the Great Lakes.

Along with the Hudson River Day Line, the Georgian Bay Lines, Great Lakes Transit Company, Canada Steamship Lines, Fall River Line, Old Bay Line, among other lines, the D&C Line is considered to be among the major passenger shipping companies of America's inland and coastal waterways. It was a people mover and a catalyst for the development of numerous towns and ports at a time when better automobile and trucking routes, along with larger bridges, were yet to be built and established.

== Notable steamships ==
- City of Mackinac (1883–1982)
- Eastern States (1901–1957)
- Western States (1902–1959)
- City of Cleveland III (1907–1956)
- City of Detroit III (1912–1957)
- Greater Detroit (1923–1957)
- Greater Buffalo (1923–1947)
- City of Alpena II
- City of St. Ignace
- State of New York

== Bibliography ==
- Interstate Commerce Commission (1916). "Appenxix, Exhibit No. 1 (Rates Via Rail-and-Lake Routes)". Interstate Commerce Commission Reports: Reports and Decisions of the Interstate Commerce Commission (December 1915 to January 1916). XXXVII. Washington: Government Printing Office.
- International Marine Engineering (1913). "Side Wheel Passenger Steamer See-and-Bee". International Marine Engineering. XVIII (6). New York, New York: Aldrish Publishing Company: 252–258.
