= Georgian Bay Line =

The Georgian Bay Line is the popular name of the Chicago, Duluth and Georgian Bay Transit Company. From 1913 until 1967, the Georgian Bay Line (GBL) provided transit service and cruise voyages to passengers on North America's Great Lakes.

House flag used by Georgian Bay Line

== History ==
=== Formation ===
The company was founded by Robert Chenault Davis, who for many years was employed by the Goodrich Line in Chicago. Mr. Davis envisioned a fleet of ships dedicated exclusively to passengers rather than the passenger and freight ships that plied the Great Lakes. The initial board consisted of Mr. Davis and four other Chicagoans: Charles Bour of President Northern Railways Advertising Company; Joseph M. Wile of Wile, Loeb & Gutman, Insurance; Dr. James Whitney Hall of the Chicago Railways Company; and Sam G. Goss, Vice President of Goss Printing Press Company.

The company was capitalized initially with $250,000 in preferred stock from about 35 investors located mostly in Chicago and Detroit.

=== Profitable operations ===
The Georgian Bay Line began operation in 1913 with the SS North American, which was launched on January 16, 1913. Due to a very profitable first season, the company launched the SS South American on February 21, 1914. Built of steel, these ships were almost sister ships. The North American had an overall length of 280 feet (85 m) while the South American was 321 feet. They carried passengers between Chicago, Mackinac Island, Sault Ste. Marie, Michigan, Duluth, Georgian Bay, Detroit, Cleveland, and Buffalo, and sometimes intermediate ports. In the 1940s, the Georgian Bay Line acquired a third vessel, SS Alabama, a refugee from the bankrupt Goodrich Transit Company where Mr. Davis had begun his career. The three ships tied up at the foot of 16th Street in Holland, Michigan, each winter and until they were permanently assigned elsewhere.

Up until World War II vessels like those operated by the Georgian Bay Line were an essential part of the transportation infrastructure of the Great Lakes. The line sold large quantities of point-to-point tickets to revenue passengers who paid publicly tariffed rates to be moved from one port to another. After the war, with increasingly inexpensive motor fuel and reliable, paved roads, point-to-point passenger volume declined and the Georgian Bay Line shifted its emphasis to the cruise ship trade.

Both vessels advertised weeklong cruises through the upper Great Lakes, with the South American traditionally visiting Lake Superior and the North American taking the Lake Michigan run. Mackinac Island, in the Straits of Mackinac, was the division point where the Y-shaped arms of the Georgian Bay Line's service territory came together.

=== Shutdown ===
The Georgian Bay Line's long-term viability was compromised by the seasonal nature of Great Lakes cruise trade. The boats were traditionally fitted out each spring in May and mothballed each fall in late September. After the invention of the passenger jet airplane in the 1950s, North American tourists found themselves able to fly to ports in locations, such as the Gulf of Mexico and the Caribbean, where twelve-month cruising was possible. In addition, cruise ships operating in international waters could hire crews from the Third World and did not have to obey U.S. or Canadian labor laws.

The Georgian Bay Line lost money in the 1960s. In 1963, after the GBL retired the North American, the South American and the Greene Line's Delta Queen were the last two long-distance cruise ships sailing under the U.S. flag. Neither vessel could meet modern fire-safety standards. In 1966, citing the danger to passengers of a catastrophic fire, Congress passed a law ordering both passenger vessels to tie up to the docks permanently. A series of temporary exceptions were carved out for the Delta Queen, but not for the South American. In 1967, the final Georgian Bay Line boat made its last trip.

The North American sank while under tow to what would have been a new life as part of a merchant marine academy, and the South American was scrapped in 1992. The Alabama was cut down to a barge in 1961 and was still afloat until 2005, when she was scrapped.
