= Corn Belt Fleet =

Corn belt fleet was a term used during World War II to describe the following training ships of the United States Navy;

- USS Sable, a pilot training ship
- USS Wolverine, a pilot training ship
