= USS Sable =

US Navy training ship in service 1943–1945

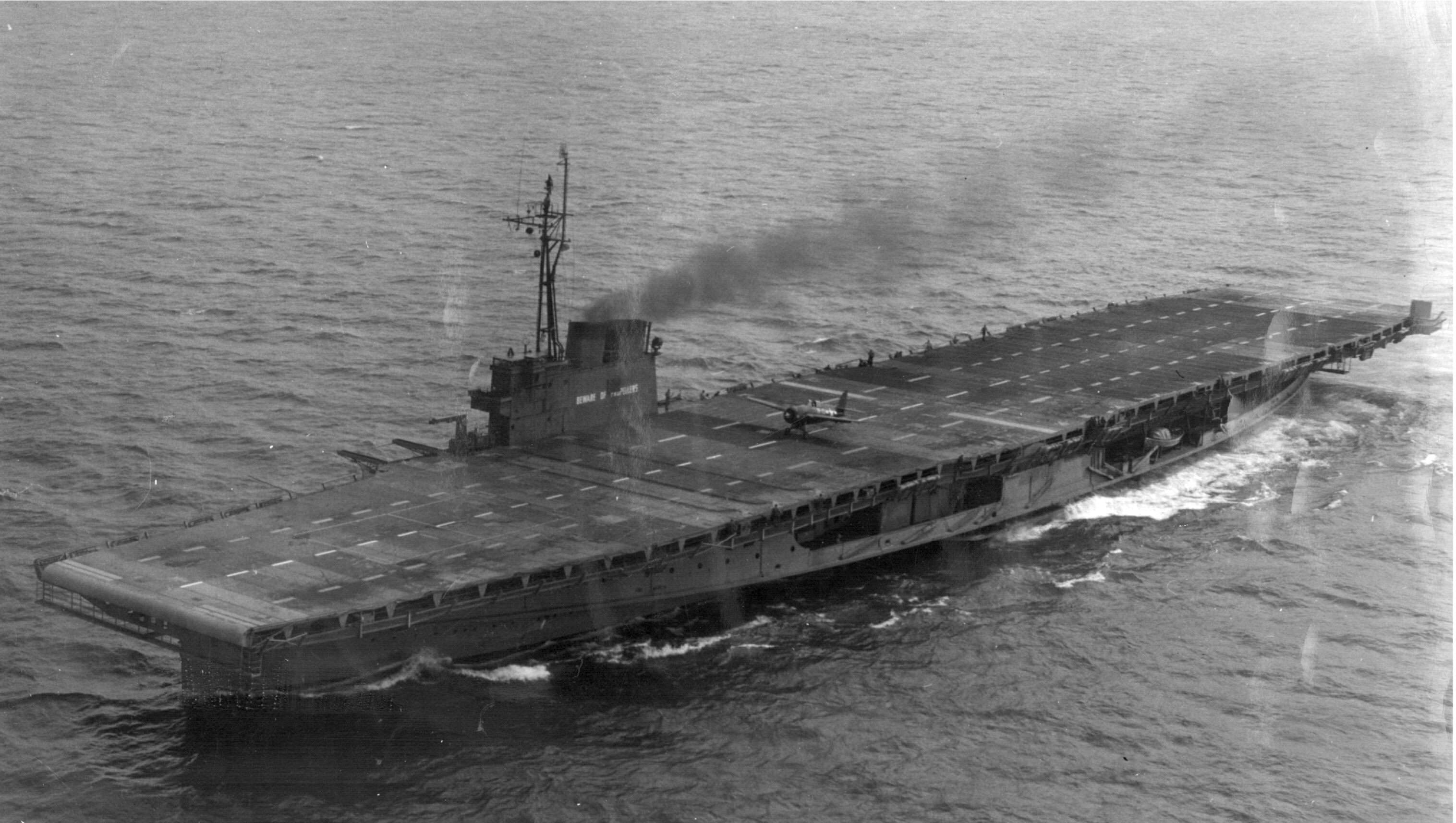
- USS Sable (IX-81) underway on Lake Michigan in 1944–45

History

United States
- Name: Greater Buffalo
- Owner: Detroit and Cleveland Navigation Company
- Port of registry: Detroit
- Route: Buffalo to Detroit
- Builder: American Ship Building Company, Lorain, Ohio
- Cost: $3,500,000.00
- Way number: 00786
- Launched: 27 October 1924
- Maiden voyage: 13 May 1925
- Identification: United States Official Number 223663; Code Letters WSBH (1934–42)
- Nickname(s): "Majestic of the Great Lakes"
- Fate: Acquired by the United States Navy on 7 August 1942.

United States
- Name: USS Sable
- Namesake: Sable
- Acquired: 7 August 1942
- Commissioned: 8 May 1943
- Decommissioned: 7 November 1945
- Stricken: 28 November 1945
- Identification: Code Letters NYZP; Hull number IX-81
- Honors and awards: American Campaign Medal; World War II Victory Medal
- Fate: Sold on 7 July 1948 for scrapping.

General characteristics
- Tonnage: 7,739 GRT as Greater Buffalo
- Displacement: 6,584 long tons (6,690 t) (as Sable)
- Length: 518.7 ft (158.1 m) (as Greater Buffalo); 535 ft (163.1 m) (as Sable)
- Beam: 58 ft (17.7 m) (as Greater Buffalo and Sable)
- Height: 21.3 ft (6.5 m) (as Greater Buffalo)
- Decks: 7 (as Greater Buffalo)
- Installed power: Inclined compound steam engine; Piston #1: 66 in (170 cm); Piston #2: 96 in (240 cm); Piston #3: 96 in (240 cm); Stroke length: 108 in (270 cm); 9 boilers; 3 × 100 kW turbo generators for ship lighting and operation.
- Propulsion: Sidewheel; 32.75 ft (10.0 m) diameter; 11 floats (paddles) that were 14.833 ft (4.521 m) long and 5 ft (1.5 m) wide; 30 revolutions per minute
- Speed: 18 knots (33 km/h)
- Crew: 300 (as Greater Buffalo)
- Notes: 2 × 6,000 lb (2,700 kg) anchors fore and 1 × 6,000 lb (2,700 kg) anchor aft (as Greater Buffalo)

USS Sable (IX-81) was a United States Navy training ship during World War II, originally built as the passenger ship Greater Buffalo, a sidewheel excursion steamboat. She was purchased by the Navy in 1942 and converted to a training aircraft carrier to be used on the Great Lakes. She lacked a hangar deck, elevators, or armament and was not a true warship, but she provided advanced training of naval aviators in carrier takeoffs and landings.

On her first day of service, 59 pilots became qualified within nine hours of operations, with each making eight takeoffs and landings. Pilot training was conducted seven days a week in all types of weather conditions. George H. W. Bush, later president of the United States, was one of the aviators who trained on Sable.

Sable was decommissioned on 7 November 1945. She was sold for scrapping on 7 July 1948 to the H. H. Buncher Company. She and her sister ship USS Wolverine – which together were used for the training of over 17,000 pilots, landing signal officers, and other navy personnel – hold the distinction of being the only freshwater, coal-fired, side paddle-wheel aircraft carriers used by the United States Navy.

== Construction ==
Formerly named Greater Buffalo, Sable was built in 1924 by the American Ship Building Company of Lorain, Ohio, as a sidewheel excursion steamer designed by marine architect Frank E. Kirby. Her hull number was 00786 and the official number assigned to her was 223663.

The interior of the ship was designed by W & J Sloane & Company of New York City in what was referred to as "an adaptation of the Renaissance style". The ship's saloon was on two decks, and there were 650 staterooms and more than 1,500 berths for passengers. A 22-foot (6.7 m)-long transportation-themed mural, painted by New York City artists Francklyn Paris and Frederick Wiley, was created on board Greater Buffalo. On the promenade deck at the stern of the ship was a smoking room with a line of windows that arced from one side of the ship to the other. Each room had a telephone connected by a central switch board located in the ship's lobby. The highest priced staterooms offered a private bathroom, couch and balcony. Her dining room could seat 375 with amenities including distilled water and what was advertised as "washed and cooled air". Foot lights were incorporated into the hallways and staircases so that the main lights could be turned off for the passengers sleeping comfort. Greater Buffalo could transport up to 103 vehicles on her main deck and 1,000 tons of freight. At the time she was given the nickname "Majestic of the Great Lakes".

To protect against a shipboard fire, safety features that were included in her construction included an automatic fire alarm system, a sprinkler system throughout the ship and fire safety walls. Her hull was all steel with eleven watertight compartments and a double bottom divided into sixteen watertight compartments. Hydraulically controlled watertight doors could be remotely operated from the engine room. A full-time watchman was on duty to add an extra layer of protection for the ship and passengers. Navigation equipment included a Sperry gyro compass and log, a Haynes automatic sounding machine along with high powered searchlights at each end of the ship. The ship was also equipped with twelve 60-person capacity lifeboats along with an assortment of life rafts and floats.

When completed, Greater Buffalo was 518.7 ft (158.1 m) in length, a beam of 58 ft (18 m), height of 21.3 ft (6.5 m) and measured 7,739 gross register tons. She had nine boilers installed and was powered by a three-cylinder inclined compound steam engine. The engine, built by American Shipbuilding, had one cylinder of 66 inches (170 cm) diameter and two of 96 inches (240 cm) diameter by 108 inches (270 cm) stroke. It was rated at 1,915NHP.

She was seven decks high, carried three funnels along her top and was equipped with rudders at both ends of the ship for improved maneuverability. She carried a crew of 300 officers and enlisted with their cabins stationed on the lowest deck fore and aft of the ship's machinery. The final cost for construction was $3,500,000.00.

== History ==
Following a period of company growth during World War I, the Detroit and Cleveland Navigation Company was able to order a pair of new ships for their Great Lakes routes. Greater Buffalo, along with her sister ship Greater Detroit, was among the largest side-wheel paddle ships on the Great Lakes when she entered service in 1924. Her port of registry was Detroit, Michigan.

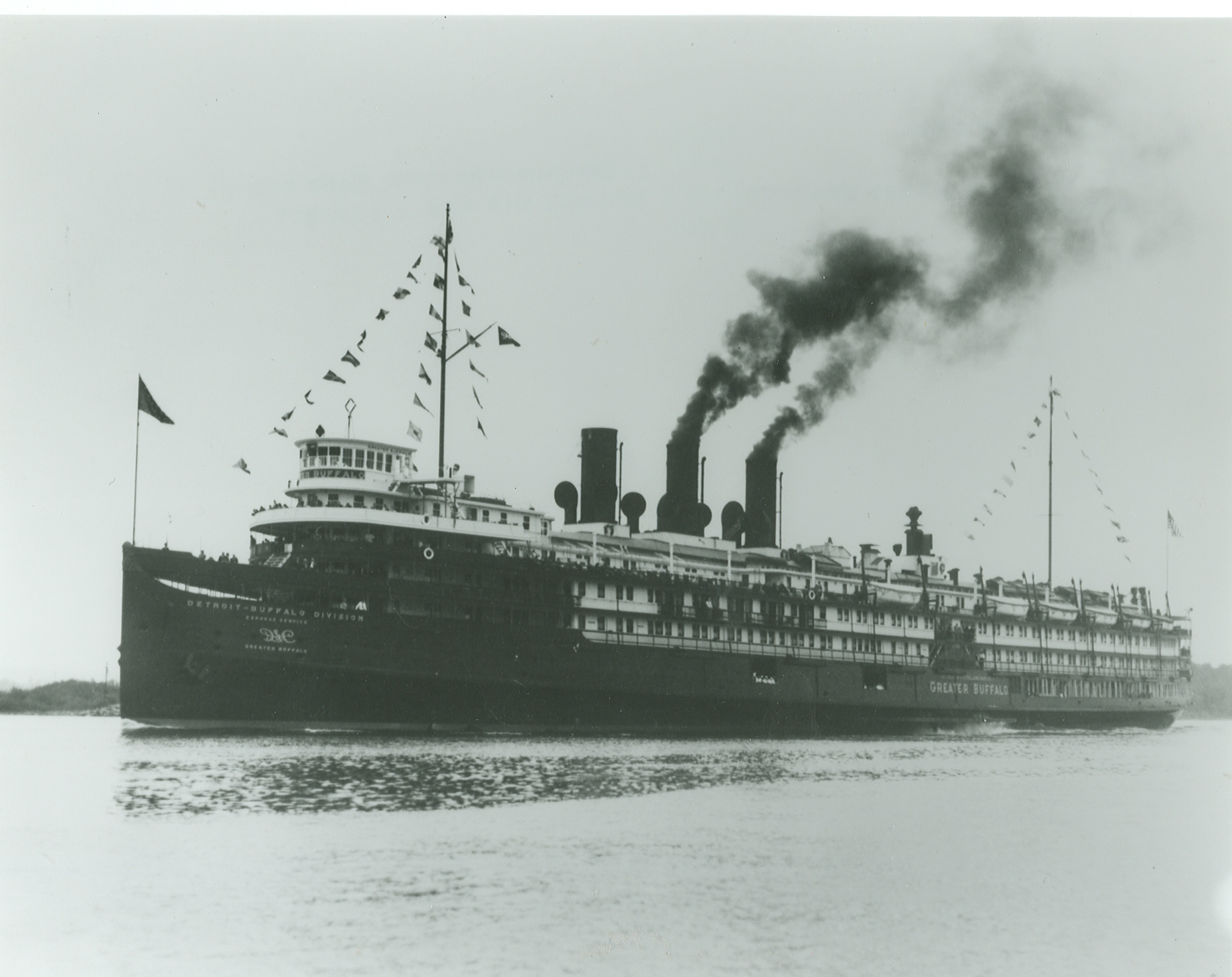
Greater Buffalo underway in 1942

On her maiden voyage to Buffalo, New York, on 13 May 1925 Greater Buffalo carried a capacity number of passengers including T.V. O'Connor, who was president of the shipping board at the time. Greater Buffalo was used as a palatial overnight service boat transporting up to 1,500 passengers from Buffalo to Detroit, Michigan, for the Detroit and Cleveland Navigation Company. Guests were entertained by an orchestra for dancing in the main dining room following dinner service as well as radio programming provided in the main salon. Along with passenger service Greater Buffalo, as well as other Detroit and Cleveland Navigation Company ships, offered their customers the option of transportation for 125 automobiles on their voyage.

During the Great Depression Greater Buffalo along with her sister ship were taken out of service from 1930 through 1935. This, along with union disputes and worker strikes, caused continuing losses for her owners. In 1934, she had been allocated the Code Letters WSBH. In 1936 Greater Buffalo was docked at Cleveland and used as a "floating hotel" for attendees of the Republican Convention. The ship was reported to have broken free of her moorings and drifted out into the harbor during a storm but was brought back by harbor tugs. During the 1938 season Greater Buffalo along with Greater Detroit were removed from service only to be returned to service the following year.

Following the attack on Pearl Harbor in 1941 there was a need for large vessels that could be converted into training aircraft carriers for pilot training. Greater Buffalo's length, following conversion, would be roughly two-thirds the length of an Independence-class aircraft carrier and it was felt by the navy that if pilots could master takeoffs and landings on the shorter deck they would have fewer problems transitioning to a standard length carrier. Other benefits of using her for training were that an active duty combat ship would not have to be used for training and with her location on the Great Lakes she would be out of the reach of enemy submarines and mines. Greater Buffalo was acquired by the Navy on 7 August 1942 by the War Shipping Administration to be converted into a training aircraft carrier and renamed Sable on 19 September 1942.

== Naval service ==
=== Refit ===
When leaving her port in Detroit for the last time heading for her refit, it was reported that Greater Buffalo was "saluted" by those on board the other vessels in the area. Sable was converted at the Erie Plant of American Shipbuilding Company at Buffalo, New York. The cabins and superstructure of the ship were removed leaving the main deck. Along with additional supports, a steel flight deck was installed instead of the originally planned Douglas-fir wooden deck similar to what was installed on USS Wolverine. The steel deck also allowed Sable to be used for the testing a variety of non-skid coatings applied to the flight deck. The deck of Sable was equipped with eight sets of arresting cables as well. A bridge island or superstructure was constructed on the starboard side of the ship along with outriggers forward of the island for storing damaged aircraft. On the main deck a lecture room, along with projection equipment, was constructed that could accommodate more than forty aviators with bunks for twenty one aviators. She was also equipped with a sick bay, operating room, laundry, tailor shop, crew quarters, a cafeteria style galley for the crew, a mess hall for the officers, storerooms and a refrigerator. Sable lacked a hangar deck, elevators or armament, as her role was for the training of pilots for carrier take-offs and landings. A number of crew members assigned to Sable prior to her commissioning were survivors of USS Lexington, which had been lost earlier during the Battle of the Coral Sea. Sable was commissioned on 8 May 1943.

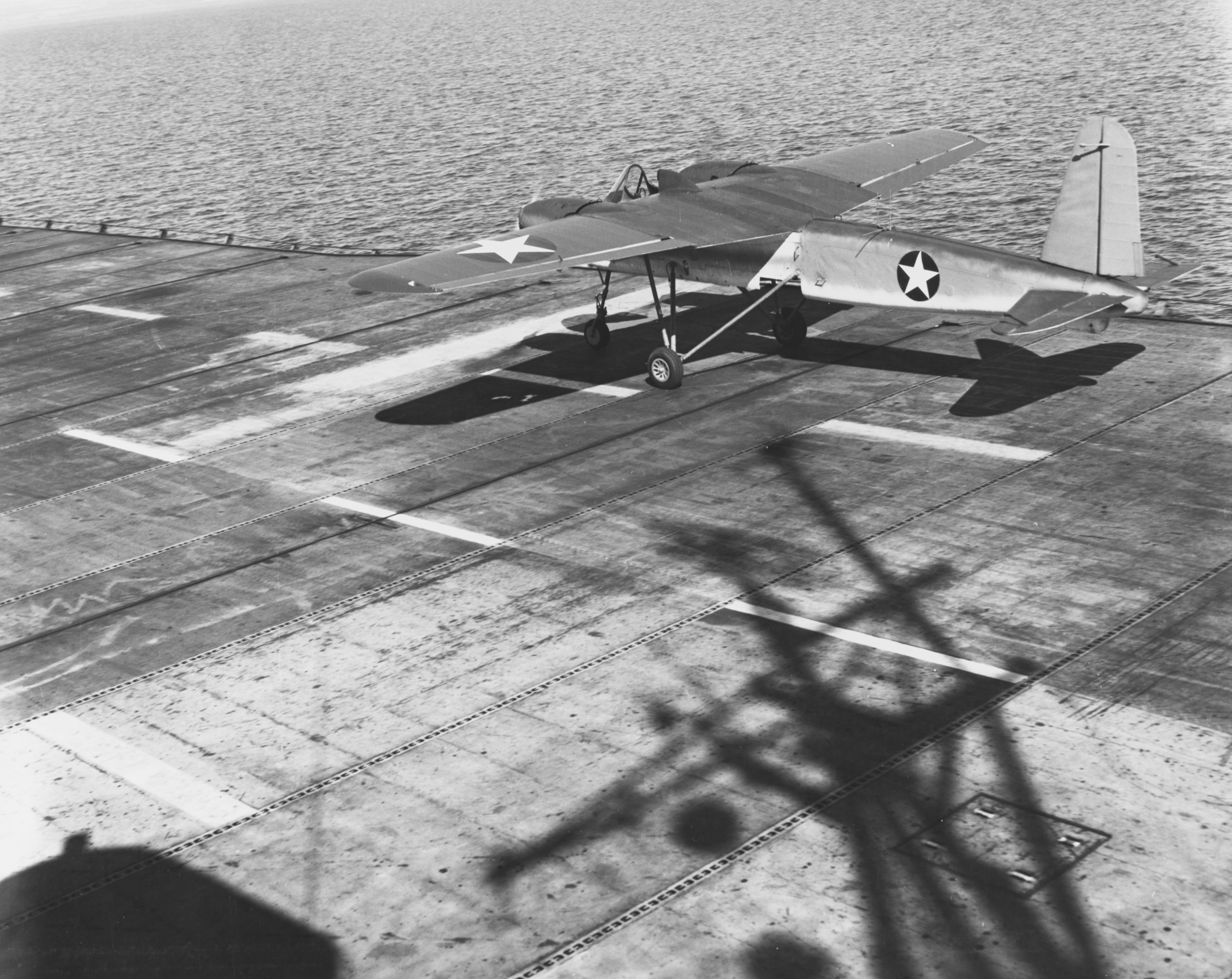
A TDN-1 assault drone aboard Sable 10 August 1943

=== Training duty ===
The completed Sable departed Buffalo on 22 May 1943 and arrived at her assigned homeport of Chicago, Illinois, on 26 May 1943 and were docked at Navy Pier joining her sister ship USS Wolverine in what was casually referred to as the "Corn Belt Fleet". Sable along with her sister ship, Wolverine, were assigned to the 9th Naval District Carrier Qualification Training Unit (CQTU) and were tasked with qualifying pilots for carrier operations. With the flight deck shorter and lower to the water it was felt that if a pilot could master take offs and landings they would have less trouble when they were stationed on a standard size carrier. Pilot training was conducted seven days a week with the fifty-nine pilots becoming qualified within nine hours of her first day of service. One issue that arose was that because of the lower top speed and height of Sable there wasn't enough "wind over deck" needed in order to launch certain types of aircraft or even carry out training on calm days. In August 1943 Sable was used as a base for testing the experimental TDN-1 torpedo drone aircraft.

=== Decommissioning and disposal ===
Following the end of World War II, Sable was decommissioned on 7 November 1945 and struck from the Naval Vessel Register on 28 November 1945. Before she was to be auctioned off a proposal was made by the Great Lakes Historical society to have Sable become a museum for Great Lakes history at Put-in-Bay, Ohio near the Commodore Perry monument. When that proposal failed she was sold by the Maritime Commission to H. H. Buncher Company on 7 July 1948 and was reported as "disposed of" on 27 July 1948. In order to fit through the Welland Canal, Sable was cut down prior to her journey to the ship breaking yard at Hamilton, Ontario. It was reported that 28 feet (8.5 m) of her beam along with 50 feet (15 m) of her stern flight deck were removed prior to her being moved by tugboats. Even with the modifications Sable only had 5 feet (1.5 m) of clearance on each side while passing through the canal locks.

=== Legacy ===
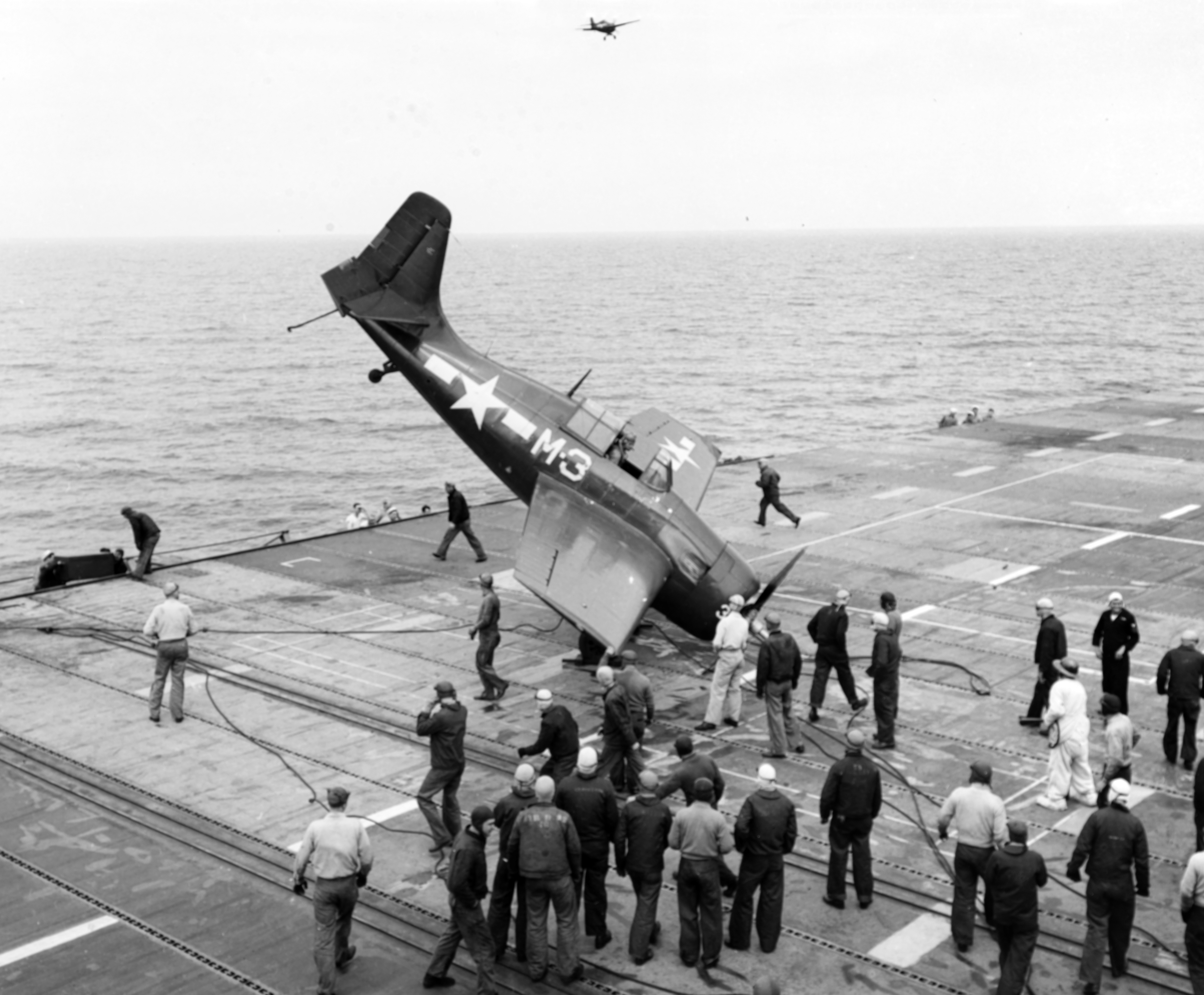
An FM-2 Wildcat upended on USS Sable during a training flight May 1945

Together, Sable and Wolverine trained 17,820 pilots in 116,000 carrier landings. Of these, 51,000 landings were on Sable alone. One of the pilots qualified on Sable was a 20-year-old Lieutenant, junior grade, future president George H. W. Bush. Of the estimated 135–300 aircraft lost during training, 35 have been salvaged and the search for more is underway. Both USS Sable and USS Wolverine hold the distinction of being the only freshwater, coal-driven, side paddle-wheel aircraft carriers used by the United States Navy. USS Sable earned both the American Campaign Medal and the World War II Victory Medal during her Naval career.

== Awards ==
USS Sable received the following awards for its World War II Service.

American Campaign Medal	World War II Victory Medal

== See also ==
- USS Wolverine (IX-64)
- SS Greater Detroit - sister ship
- Edward M. Cotter (fireboat)
- SS Canadiana
- MV Aquarama

== Bibliography ==
- Olson, Steven & Wilde, Douglas B. (2015). "Question 22/51: Engines of Training Carriers Wolverine (IX-64) and Sable (IX-81)". Warship International. LII (3): 208–212. ISSN 0043-0374.
- Silverstone, Paul H (1965). US Warships of World War II. Annapolis, Maryland: Naval Institute Press. ISBN 0-87021-773-9.
- Wilde, Douglas B. (2006). "Question 33/04: Training Carriers Sable (IX-81) and Wolverine (IX-64)". Warship International. XLIII (4): 354–360. ISSN 0043-0374.
