= City of Detroit III =

Sidewheel steam ship

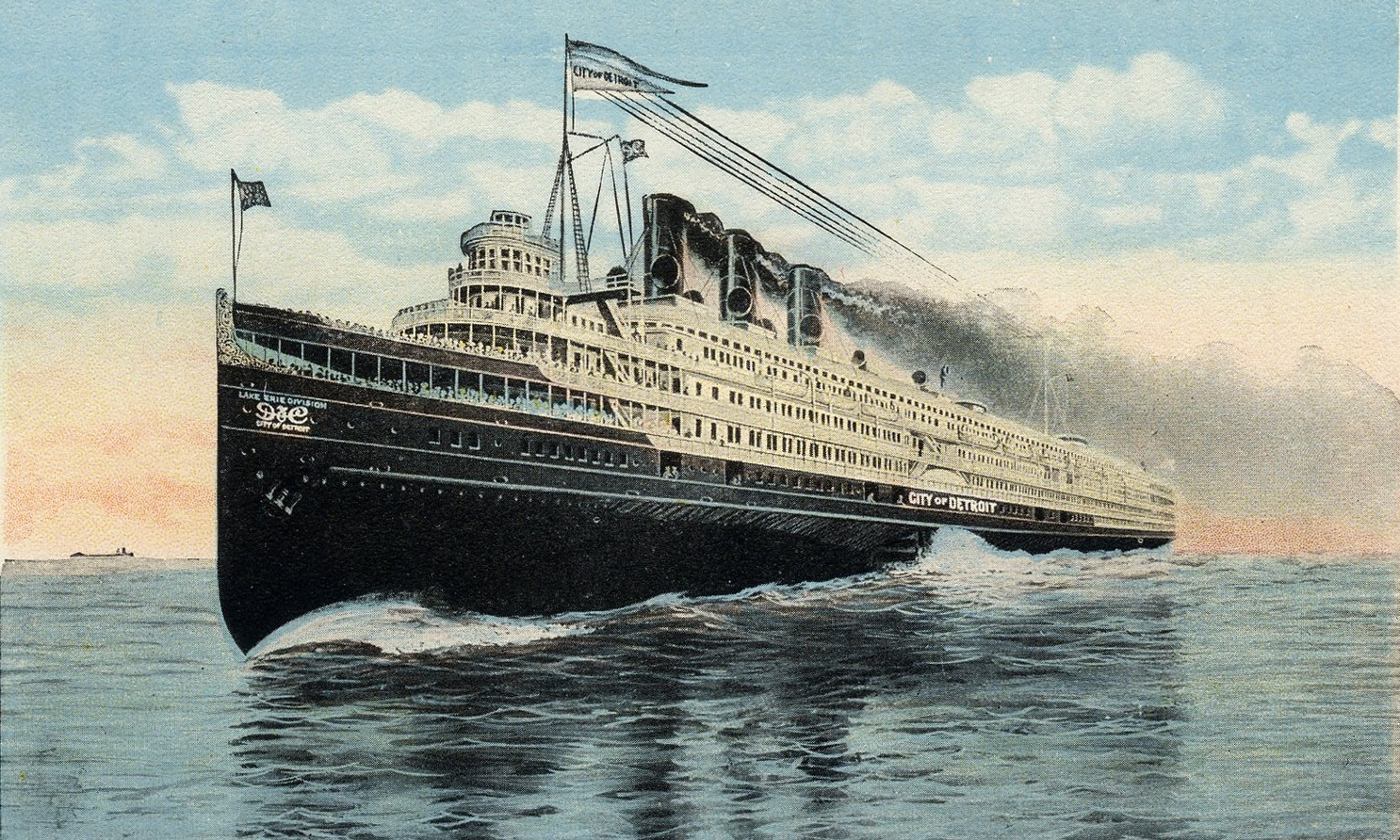
- Postcard from 1917 depicting City of Detroit III

History

United States
- Name: City of Detroit III
- Namesake: Detroit, Michigan
- Owner: Detroit & Cleveland Navigation Company
- Builder: Detroit Shipbuilding Company, Wyandotte, Michigan
- Cost: $1,500,000
- Launched: October 7, 1911
- Home port: Detroit, Michigan
- Identification: US 209571
- Fate: Dismantled in 1956 and sold for scrap

General characteristics
- Type: Sidewheel steamer
- Tonnage: 6,061 gross tons
- Length: overall: 470 ft 10 in (143.51 m); on keel: 455 ft 10 in (138.94 m)
- Beam: over guards 96 ft 6 in (29.41 m); hull, molded 55 ft 4 in (16.87 m); or 55 ft 6 in (16.92 m)
- Depth: at stem 22 ft (6.7 m); at guards 21 ft 3 in (6.48 m); at stern 29 ft 3 in (8.92 m)
- Capacity: 5,000 day passengers
- Crew: 200

City of Detroit III, often referred to as just D-III, was a sidewheel steamer on the Detroit River and Lake Erie. She was one of the largest sidewheelers on the Great Lakes.

== History ==
City of Detroit III was built by the Detroit Shipbuilding Company in Wyandotte, Michigan and was designed by Frank E. Kirby. The interior decorations were designed by painter and architect Louis O. Keil, who collaborated with Kirby on many projects. It was owned by the Detroit and Cleveland Navigation Company (D&C) and was launched on October 7, 1911. When she was launched City of Detroit III was the largest sidewheeler in the world. The next year the slightly larger 500-foot (150 m) length overall Seeandbee, another Kirby designed ship, was launched for the Cleveland & Buffalo Transit Company (C&B). City of Detroit III traveled regularly between Detroit, Michigan, Cleveland, Ohio and Buffalo, New York.

=== The "Gothic Room" ===
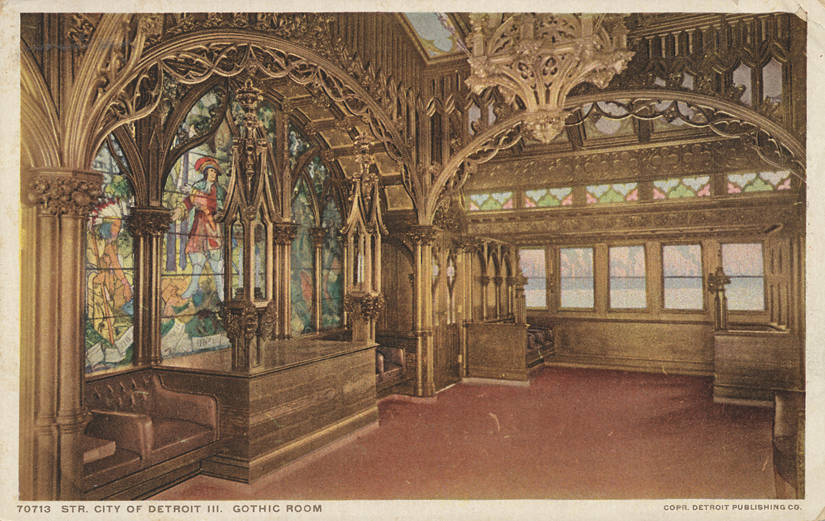
Gothic Room

City of Detroit III cost $1,500,000 to build ($50.6 million in 2024 dollars) and was ornately furnished. Forty percent of the steamer's width was situated over the wheels, allowing room for many amenities like salons, a palm court and a winery to be built into the vessel. One of the rooms was an opulent smoking room called the "Gothic Room", named for its Gothic design. It was built from English oak and included a stained glass window.

== End of service ==
City of Detroit III was taken out service in 1950, when the D&C discontinued service. She was sold for scrap in 1956, and was dismantled. City of Detroit III's "Gothic Room" was disassembled and re-erected in a barn near Cleveland, Ohio, for ten years before it was once again taken down and then partially reassembled and refinished at the Dossin Great Lakes Museum on Belle Isle in Detroit.

== Bibliography ==
- International Marine Engineering (1912). "City of Detroit III; World's Largest Side Wheel Steamer". International Marine Engineering. XVII (10). New York, New York: Aldrish Publishing Company: 389–396.
- International Marine Engineering (1913). "Side Wheel Passenger Steamer See-and-Bee". International Marine Engineering. XVIII (6). New York, New York: Aldrish Publishing Company: 252–258.
- Interstate Commerce Commission (1916). "Appenxix, Exhibit No. 1 (Rates Via Rail-and-Lake Routes)". Interstate Commerce Commission Reports: Reports and Decisions of the Interstate Commerce Commission (December 1915 to January 1916). XXXVII. Washington: Government Printing Office.
