= Dossin Great Lakes Museum =

Museum in Michigan

Coordinates: 42.3348°N 82.9854°W

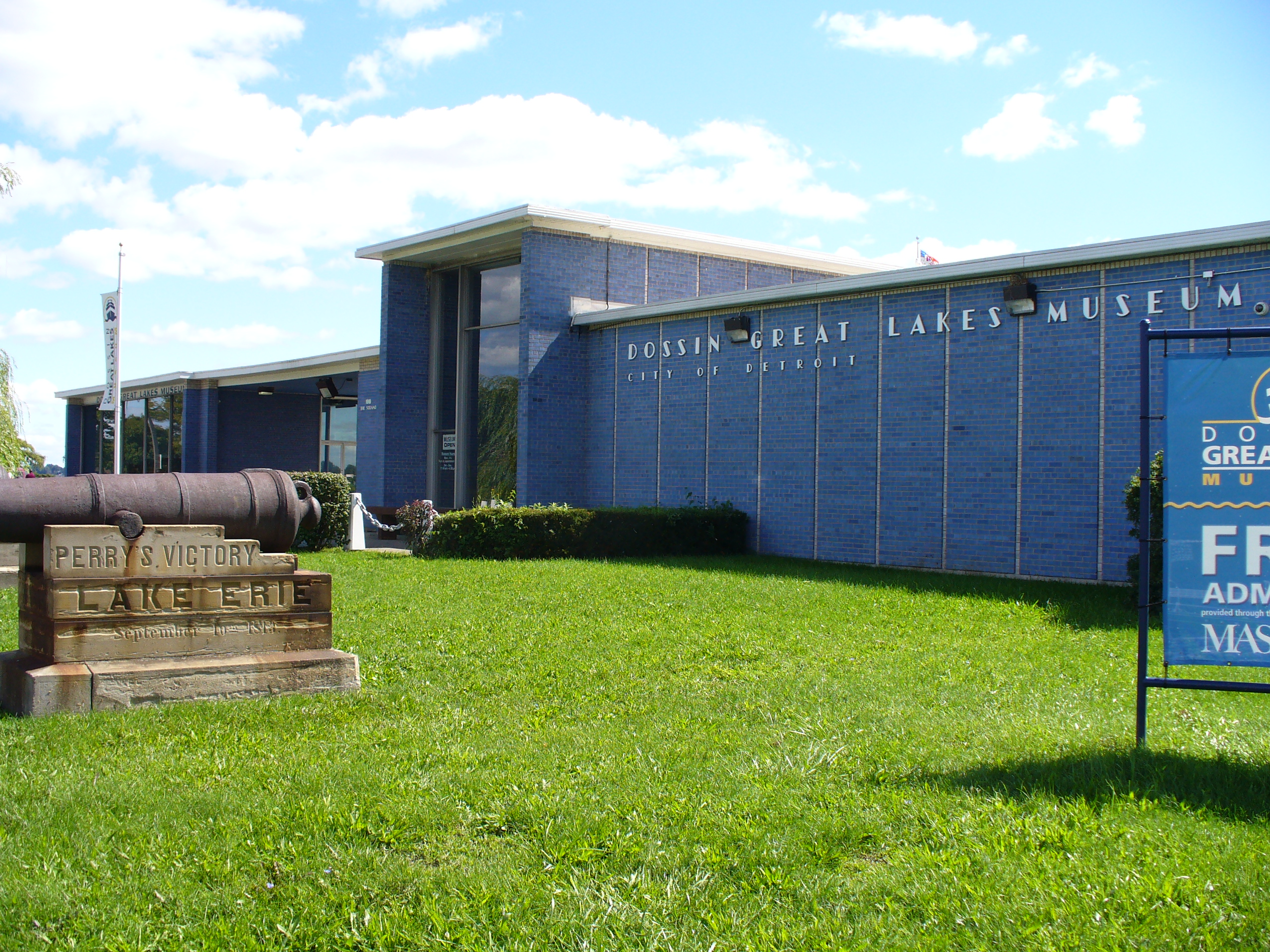
The Dossin Great Lakes Museum is located in Belle Isle Park

The Dossin Great Lakes Museum is an historical maritime museum in Detroit, Michigan. Located on The Strand on Belle Isle Park along the Detroit River, this museum places special interest on Detroit's role on national and regional maritime history. The 16,000-square-foot (1,500 m^{2}) museum features exhibits such as one of the largest collections of model ships in the world, and the bow anchor of the SS Edmund Fitzgerald, which went down in a storm in 1975. (Note: The anchor had been lost in the Detroit River.)

== History ==
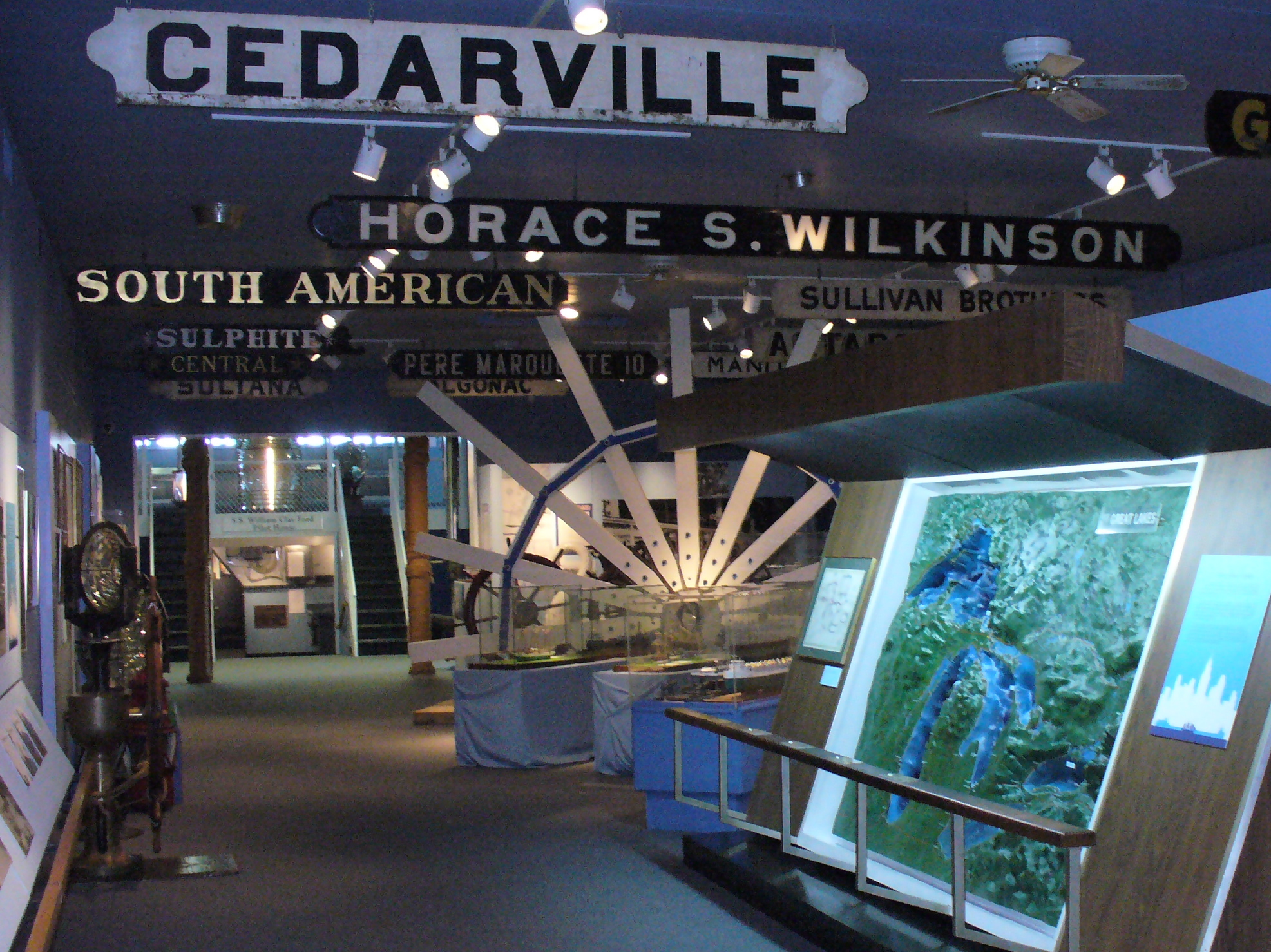
The Dossin Museum features artifacts and exhibits on the history and ships of the Great Lakes

This was founded in 1949 as the City Maritime Museum aboard the J. T. Wing wooden schooner, the last commercial sailing ship on the Great Lakes. The museum closed by 1956, less than a decade later, because of the deteriorating condition of the schooner.

With $125,000 in donations from Detroit's Dossin family, and a matching subsidy by the city's historical commission, the Dossin Great Lakes Museum broke ground on Belle Isle on May 21, 1959, near the former mooring of the J. T. Wing. It was opened on July 24, 1961. William Edward Kapp was the lead architect for the firm of Smith, Hinchman & Grylls.

The Dossin Museum went through a 10-week renovation ending March 24, 2007 after over $100,000 in refurbishments, added four new exhibits.

== Permanent exhibits ==
- The Miss Pepsi, one of the fastest hydroplane racing boats of all time, and the first boat to qualify for a race at a speed of over 100 miles per hour, owned and sponsored by the Dossin Family, one of the largest bottlers of Pepsi-Cola in the United States.
- The massive bow anchor of the SS Edmund Fitzgerald; the Fitzgerald had lost the anchor in the Detroit River
- The SS William Clay Ford Pilot House, where visitors can "be the captain" of one of the city's most noted freighters
- The restored smoking lounge of the SS City of Detroit III, which transports visitors back to the golden age of lake steamers
- One of the largest known collections of scale model ships in the world

== See also ==
- List of maritime museums in the United States
