= SS South American =

Coordinates: 42°11′00″N 87°39′00″W

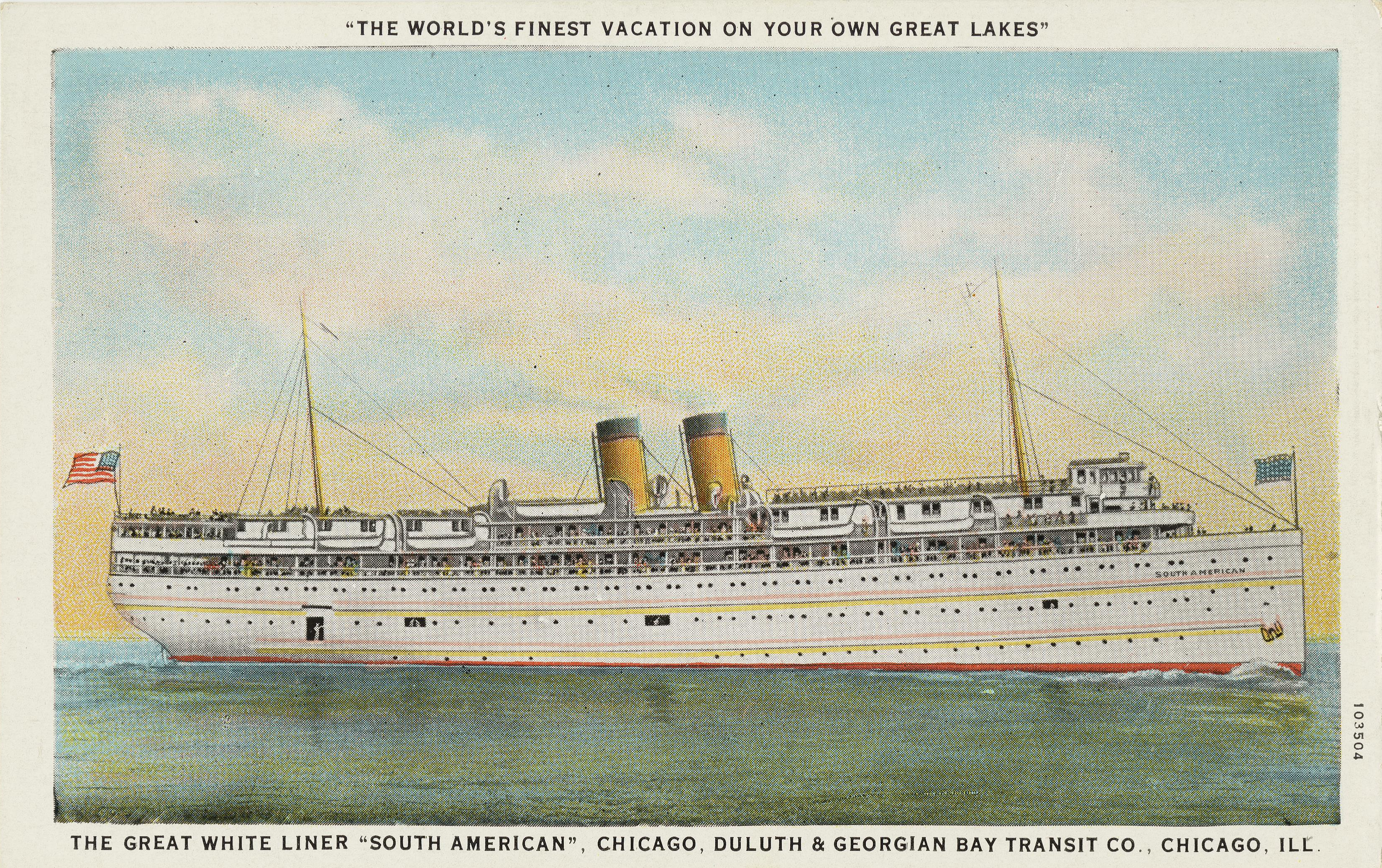
- Postcard of the South American on the Great Lakes

History

United States
- Name: South American
- Operator: Chicago, Duluth & Georgian Bay Transit Company
- Builder: Great Lakes Engineering Works; Ecorse, Michigan
- Yard number: 133
- Laid down: 26 Nov 1913
- Launched: 21 February 1914
- Completed: 1914
- Out of service: 1967
- Identification: Call sign: WGCW; IMO number: 5335060
- Fate: Failed Coast Guard Inspection 1968, scrapped 1992

General characteristics
- Type: Passenger ship
- Tonnage: 2662.00 gross
- Length: 290.50 ft (88.54 m)
- Beam: 47.00 ft (14.33 m)
- Draft: 18.25 ft (5.56 m)
- Propulsion: one propeller
- Notes: Steel

SS South American was a Great Lakes steamer built by the Great Lakes Engineering Works at Ecorse, Michigan. It was built in 1913/14 for the Chicago, Duluth & Georgian Bay Transit Company. The vessel was launched on February 21, 1914 and was the newer of two near-sister ships, the older one being the North American.

The South American was 314 feet (96 m) in length, had a 47-foot (14 m) beam, and drew 18 feet (5.5 m). She was equipped with a 2,200 indicated horsepower quadruple-expansion steam engine and three coal-burning Scotch marine boilers.

She caught fire on September 9, 1924 in winter lay-up at Holland, Michigan. Her upper works were rebuilt that winter. Also at the time, a second smokestack was added and her coal-fired boilers were converted to oil-burning.

In 1967, the South American departed from her usual schedule to offer trips to the 1967 World's Fair in Montreal. At the end of the season, she was retired from regular passenger service and sold to Seafarers International Union in Piney Point, Maryland, as a replacement for the North American which sank a year prior while in tow there. Failing Coast Guard inspection, she was moved to Camden, New Jersey, where she rotted before being scrapped in 1992 in Baltimore.
