= SS North American =

Coordinates: 42°11′00″N 87°39′00″W

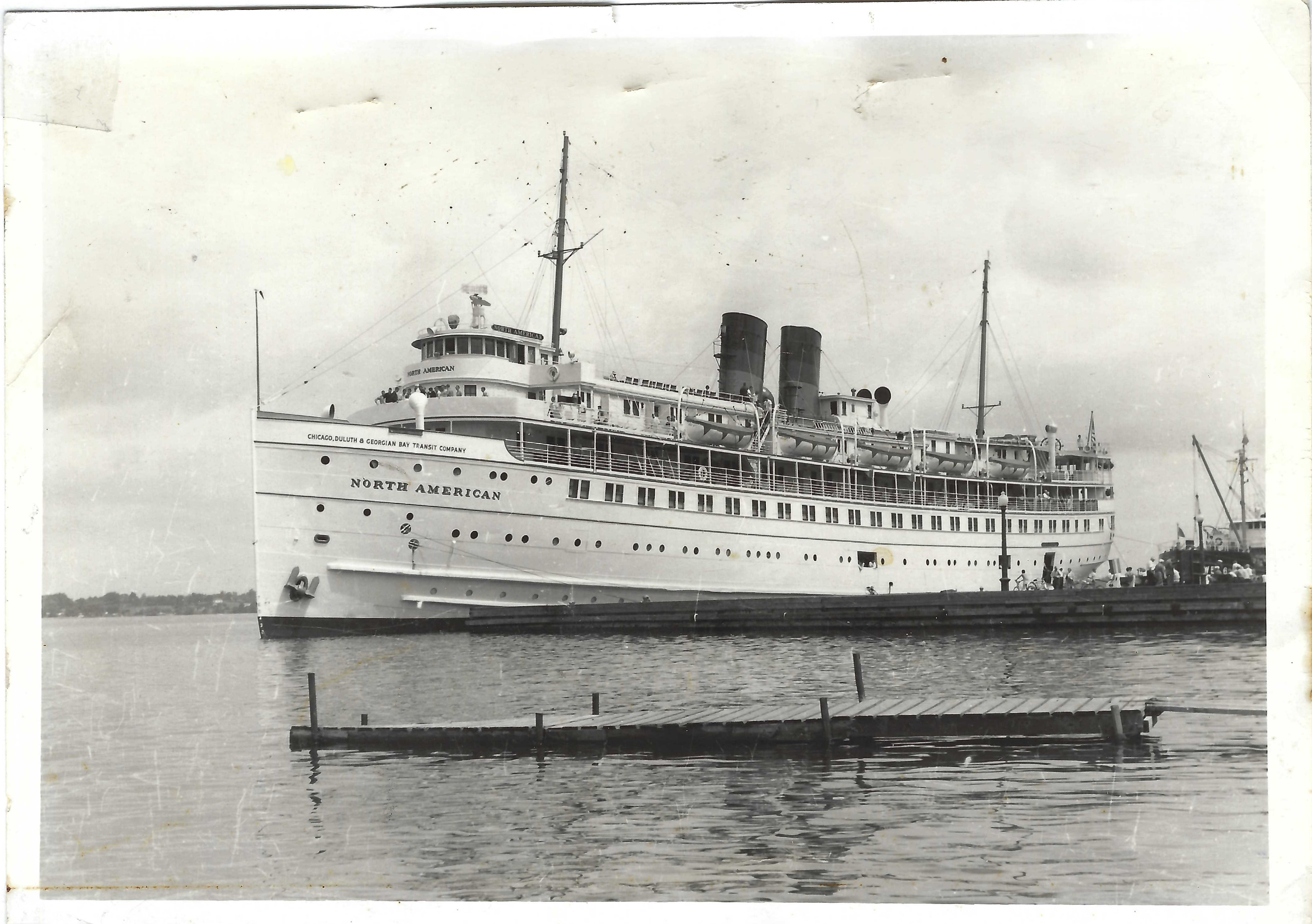
- North American

History

United States
- Name: North American
- Operator: Chicago, Duluth & Georgian Bay Transit Company
- Builder: Great Lakes Engineering Works; Ecorse, Michigan
- Yard number: 107
- Laid down: 11 November 1912
- Launched: 16 January 1913
- Completed: 1914
- Out of service: 1964
- Identification: Call sign: WTBA; IMO number: 5256783
- Fate: Sunk 13 September 1967

General characteristics
- Type: Passenger ship
- Tonnage: 2317.00 gross
- Length: 259.00 ft (78.94 m)
- Beam: 47.00 ft (14.33 m)
- Draft: 18.25 ft (5.56 m)
- Propulsion: one propeller
- Notes: Steel

North American was a Great Lakes steamship built by the Great Lakes Engineering Works at Ecorse, Michigan, in 1913 for the Chicago, Duluth & Georgian Bay Transit Company. The vessel was launched on January 16, 1913, and was the older of two near-sister ships, the newer one being SS South American.

North American was 280 feet (85 m) in length, had a 47-foot (14 m) beam, and drew 17 feet 6 inches (5.33 m) She had a 2,200 indicated horsepower quadruple expansion steam engine and three coal-burning Scotch boilers. In 1923 the boilers were converted to burn oil.

In 1963, North American was sold to the Canadian Holiday Company of Erie, Pennsylvania. The company used her in cross-lake service between Erie and Port Dover, Ontario, Canada, for one year until she was retired in 1964. After being retired from service, North American was involved in purchasing deals of uncertain nature, and was finally sold at public auction to the Seafarers International Union of North America in 1967 for use as a training ship at Piney Point, Maryland.

While under tow by the tug Michael McAllister from Boston to Newport News, the vessel unexpectedly sank in the North Atlantic on the night of 13 September 1967, due to swells created by the approaching Hurricane Doria, 25 nautical miles (29 mi; 46 km) northeast of Nantucket Light.

In July 2006, a research team aboard Quest Marine’s research vessel Quest located the North American close to the edge of the continental shelf, approximately 140 miles (230 km) off the New England coast in 250 feet (76 m) of water.
