= USS Wolverine (IX-64) =

US Navy training ship in service 1942–1945

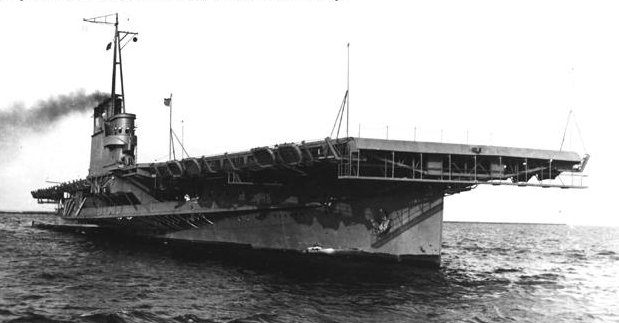
- USS Wolverine in Chicago harbor on 22 August 1942.

History

United States
- Name: Seeandbee
- Owner: Cleveland and Buffalo Transit Company
- Builder: Detroit Shipbuilding Company, Wyandotte, Michigan
- Yard number: 190
- Launched: 9 November 1912
- Maiden voyage: 19 June 1913
- Identification: United States Official Number 211085
- Fate: Sold to the C & B Transit Company of Chicago for $135,000

United States
- Name: Seeandbee
- Owner: C & B Transit Company of Chicago
- Fate: Sold to the United States Navy 12 March 1942 for $756,500 (Note: equivalent to $14,906,594 in 2025)

United States
- Name: USS Wolverine
- Namesake: Wolverine
- Acquired: 2 March 1942
- Commissioned: 12 August 1942
- Decommissioned: 7 November 1945
- Renamed: Wolverine on 2 August 1942
- Refit: 6 May 1942
- Stricken: 28 November 1945
- Home port: Chicago, Illinois (9th Naval District Carrier Qualification Training Unit)
- Identification: Code Letters NWMN; Hull number IX-64
- Honors and awards: American Campaign Medal; World War II Victory Medal
- Fate: Transferred to the Maritime Commission for disposal 26 November 1947 and sold for scrap December 1947

General characteristics
- Type: Side wheel paddle steamer
- Tonnage: 6,381 GRT (Note: The cited reference is not the equivalent of today's gross tonnage standardized in the 1960s. It is likely, though not specified, one of several measures of gross register tonnage of the registering authority and time.); 1,500 DWT
- Displacement: 7,200 long tons (7,300 t) (Wolverine)
- Length: 500 ft (150 m)
- Beam: 58 ft (17.7 m) hull, molded; 97 ft 8 in (29.8 m) extreme, over guards
- Draft: 15.5 ft (4.7 m)
- Decks: 5
- Installed power: Inclined compound steam engine; Piston #1: 66 in (170 cm); Piston #2: 96 in (240 cm); Piston #3: 96 in (240 cm); Stroke Length: 108 in (270 cm); 6 single-ended & 3 double-ended coal-fired boilers.; 12,000 ihp (8,900 kW)
- Speed: 22 miles per hour (35.4 km/h; 19.1 kn)
- Complement: 270 (Wolverine)

USS Wolverine (IX-64) was a training ship used by the United States Navy during World War II. She was originally named Seeandbee and was built as a Great Lakes luxury side-wheel steamer passenger ship for the Cleveland and Buffalo Transit Company. Seeandbee was launched on 9 November 1912 and was normally used on the Cleveland, Ohio, to Buffalo, New York, route with special cruises to other ports. After the original owners went bankrupt in 1939, Seeandbee was purchased by the C&B Transit Company of Chicago and continued operating until 1941.

Seeandbee was acquired by the United States Navy in 1942 and was quickly converted into a freshwater aircraft carrier for the advanced training of naval aviators in carrier take-offs and landings. Renamed USS Wolverine, she was not equipped with armor, a hangar deck, elevators or armaments. As a genuine flattop, Wolverine was shorter, and her flight deck closer to the water, than many of the fighting aircraft carriers of the day. Though unsuited for combat, she was highly functional in her pilot training mission.

The first aircraft landing on USS Wolverine occurred during September 1942. From 1943 until the end of the war in 1945, USS Wolverine along with her sister ship USS Sable was used for the training of 17,000 pilots, landing signal officers and other navy personnel with minimal losses. Following the end of World War II, the navy decommissioned Wolverine on 7 November 1945, and she was sold for scrap in December 1947.

== Design and construction ==
Seeandbee was designed by naval architect Frank E. Kirby for the Cleveland and Buffalo Transit Company of Cleveland, Ohio. She was designed for luxury overnight service between Cleveland and Buffalo, New York, and the company's previous experience led it to require two basic design features for the ship. First was paddle propulsion which offered an increased maneuvering capability and stability in rough weather along with more space for cabins and decks. Second, was using a more expensive and much heavier compound inclined steam engine that could develop 12,000 horsepower at low revolutions without the vibration associated with lighter vertical type steam engines. It was felt that meeting these design features would improve passenger comfort and their desire for a good night's sleep.

The ship was built by the Detroit Shipbuilding Company, soon to be acquired and renamed American Ship Building Company, of Wyandotte, Michigan. Seeandbee, the largest side-wheel steamer in the world at the time, was launched on 9 November 1912. According to the Interstate Commerce Commission the ship's tonnage was 6,381 GRT and 1,500 DWT.

The interior design was by Louis O. Keil and luxury was a key element. Passengers boarded through a mahogany paneled lobby with a Tuscan theme. The steward's office, purser's offices, telephone booths and a stairway to the promenade deck were protected by a vestibule equipped with sliding doors. The main dining room, which was aft and extended to the rear of the ship, was paneled in mahogany and white enamel. The main dining room had alcoves with bay windows that provided some relatively private dining areas for the passengers. A banquet room was on the starboard side and two private dining rooms on the port side. A staircase led to a buffet area, below the main dining room, that was decorated in the style of an old English tavern.

Seeandbee featured a main saloon on the promenade deck that extended almost 400 ft (121.9 m) in length. This area was subdivided into sections including a book shop, flower booths, an observation room as well as separate writing rooms for men and women. A number of private parlors were constructed, each was a different design and contained beds, a private bath and balconies. When an orchestra played on its own balcony at the end of the main saloon, the music could be heard in the parlors, the saloon, above in the atrium, and in the ladies drawing room. On the gallery deck was the ladies drawing room in Italian Renaissance style with built in seats and above, on the next deck, was an Atrium with sleeping rooms adjoining. Amidships on the gallery deck was the lounge with seating and provision for light refreshments. Passengers were accommodated in 510 rooms, of which 424 were regulation, 62 were fitted with a private toilet and 24 were "parlors en suite" giving sleeping room for 1,500 persons and capable of carrying a total of 6,000 passengers and 1,500 tons of cargo loaded on the main deck.

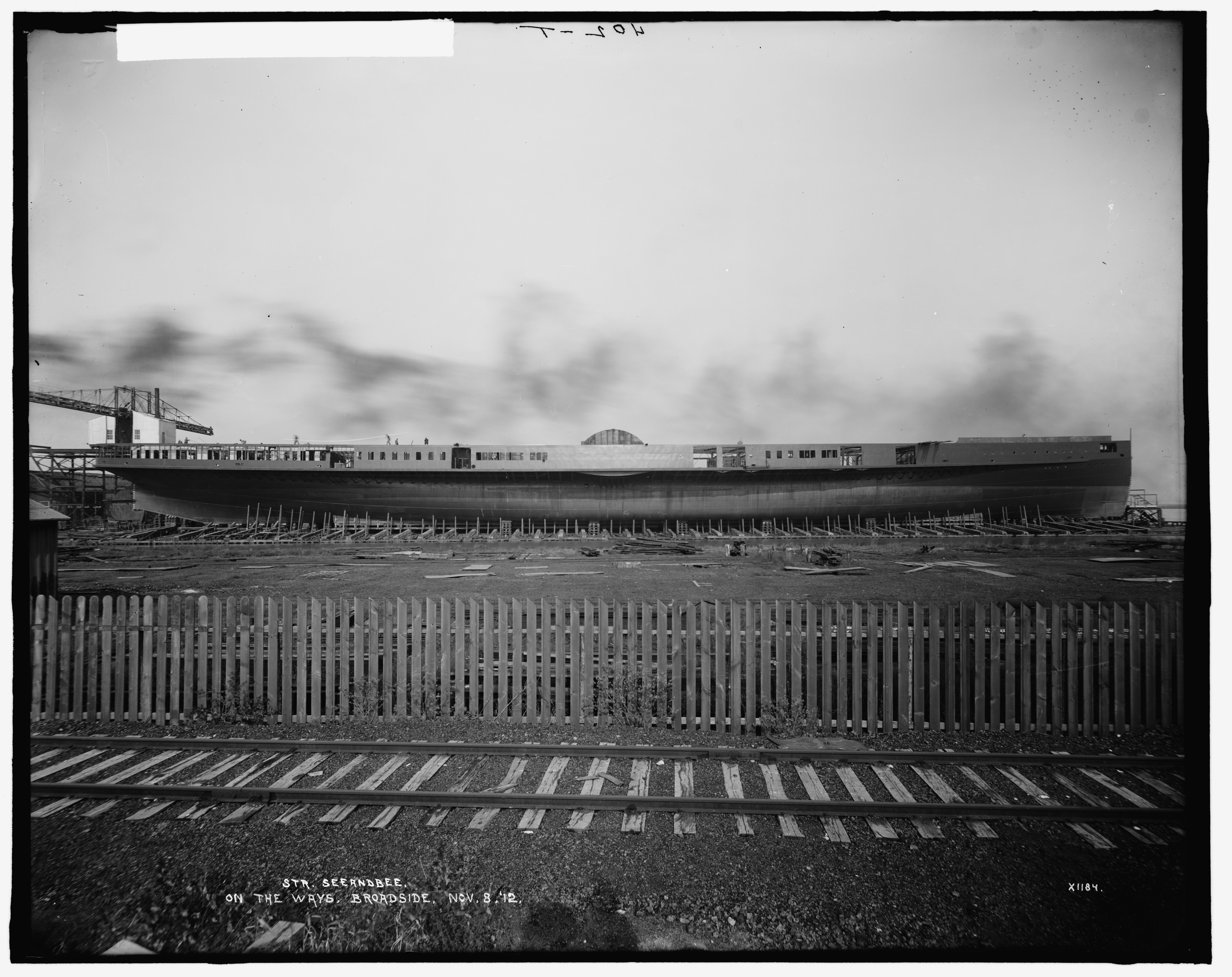
Preparing Seeandbee for launch, 8 November 1912

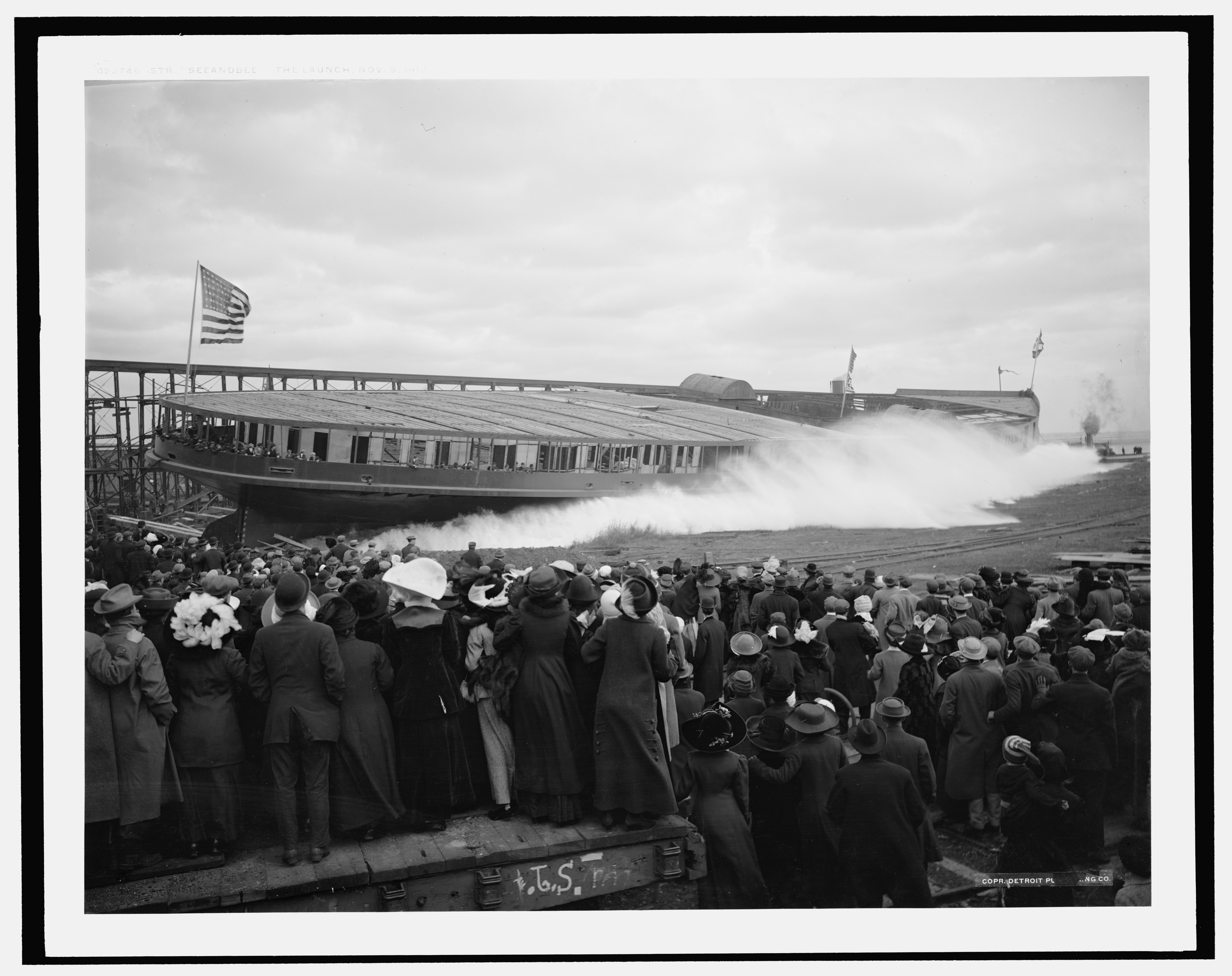
Launching Seeandbee, 9 November 1912

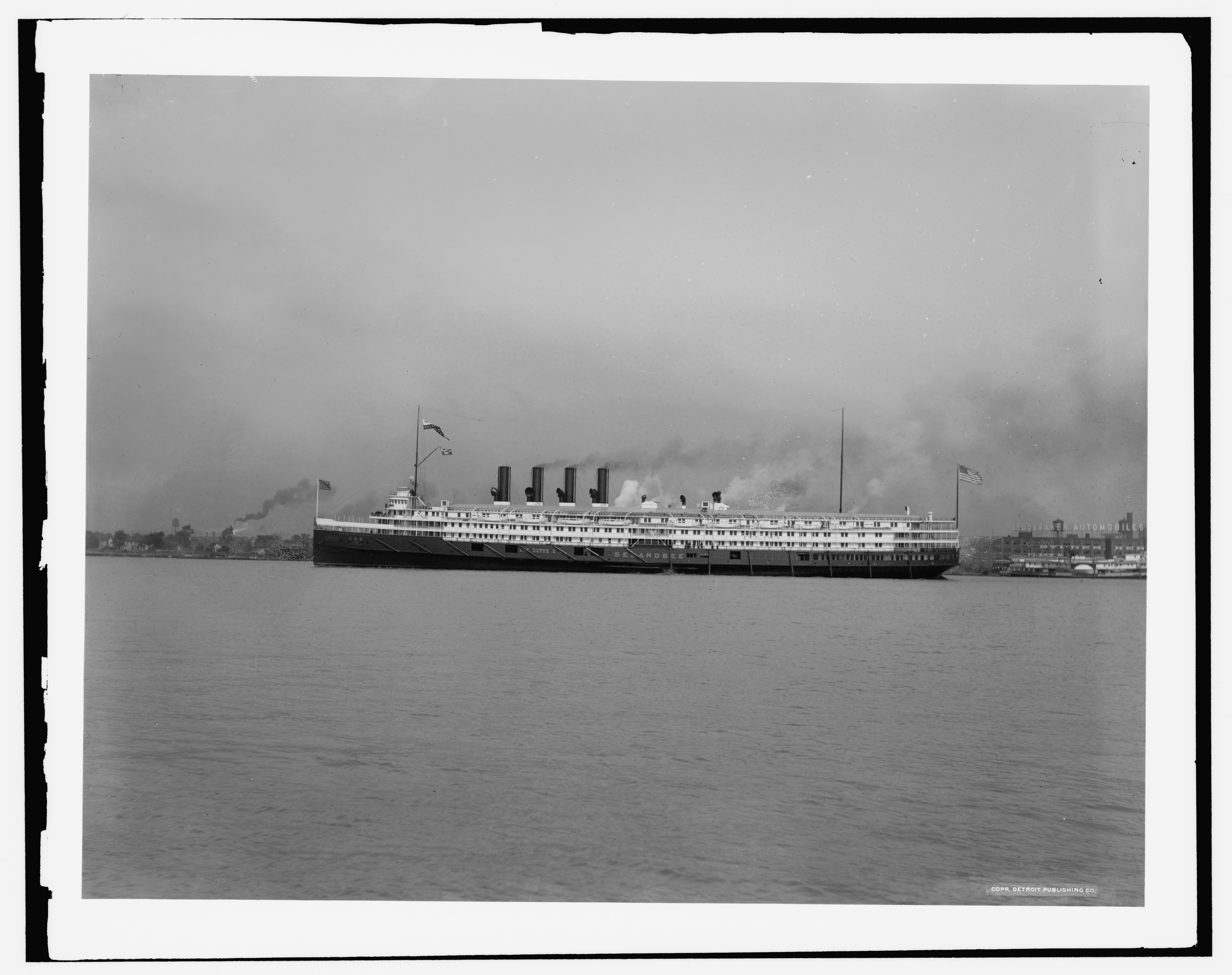
Seeandbee c. 1913

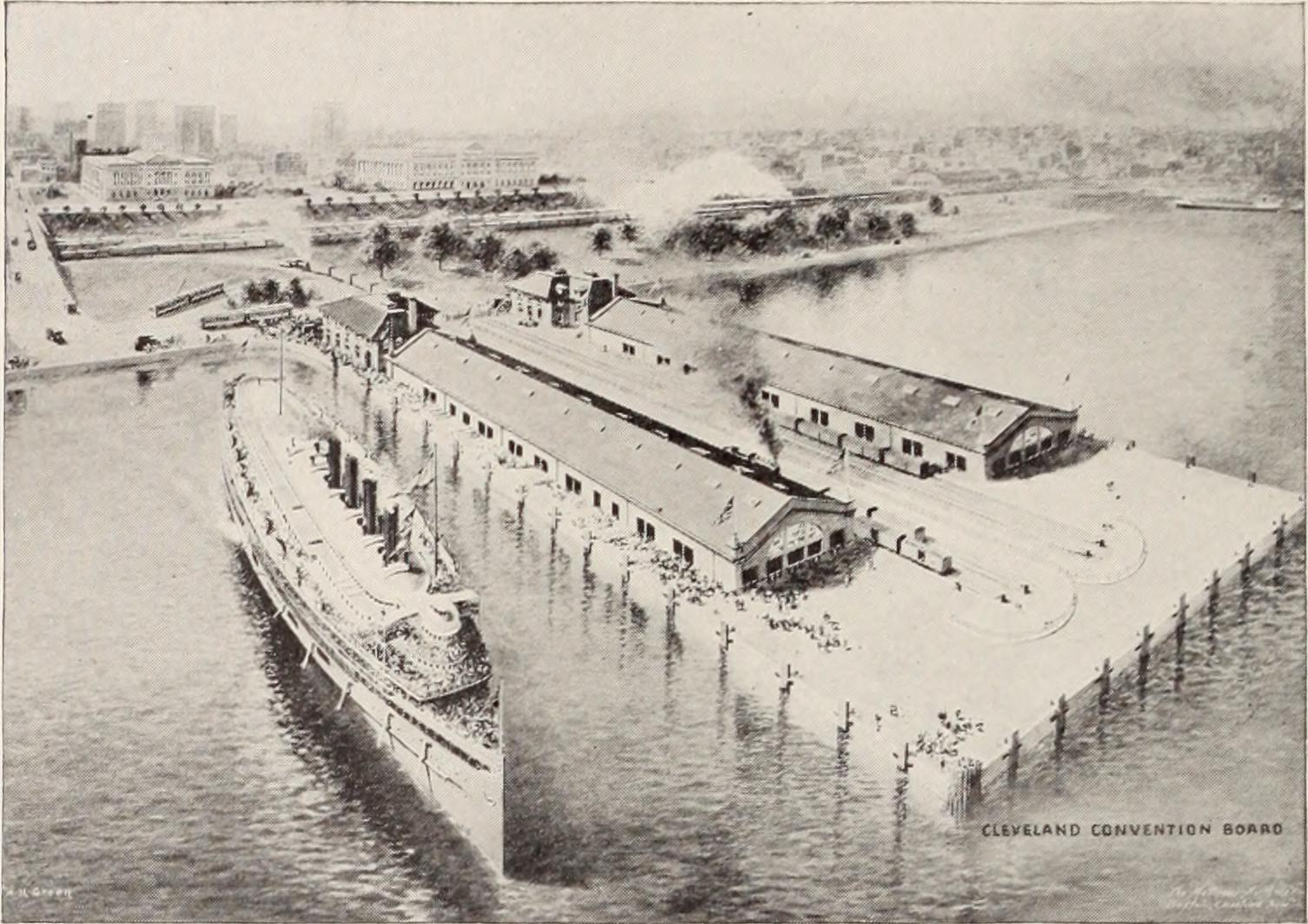
Seeandbee at her Cleveland terminal

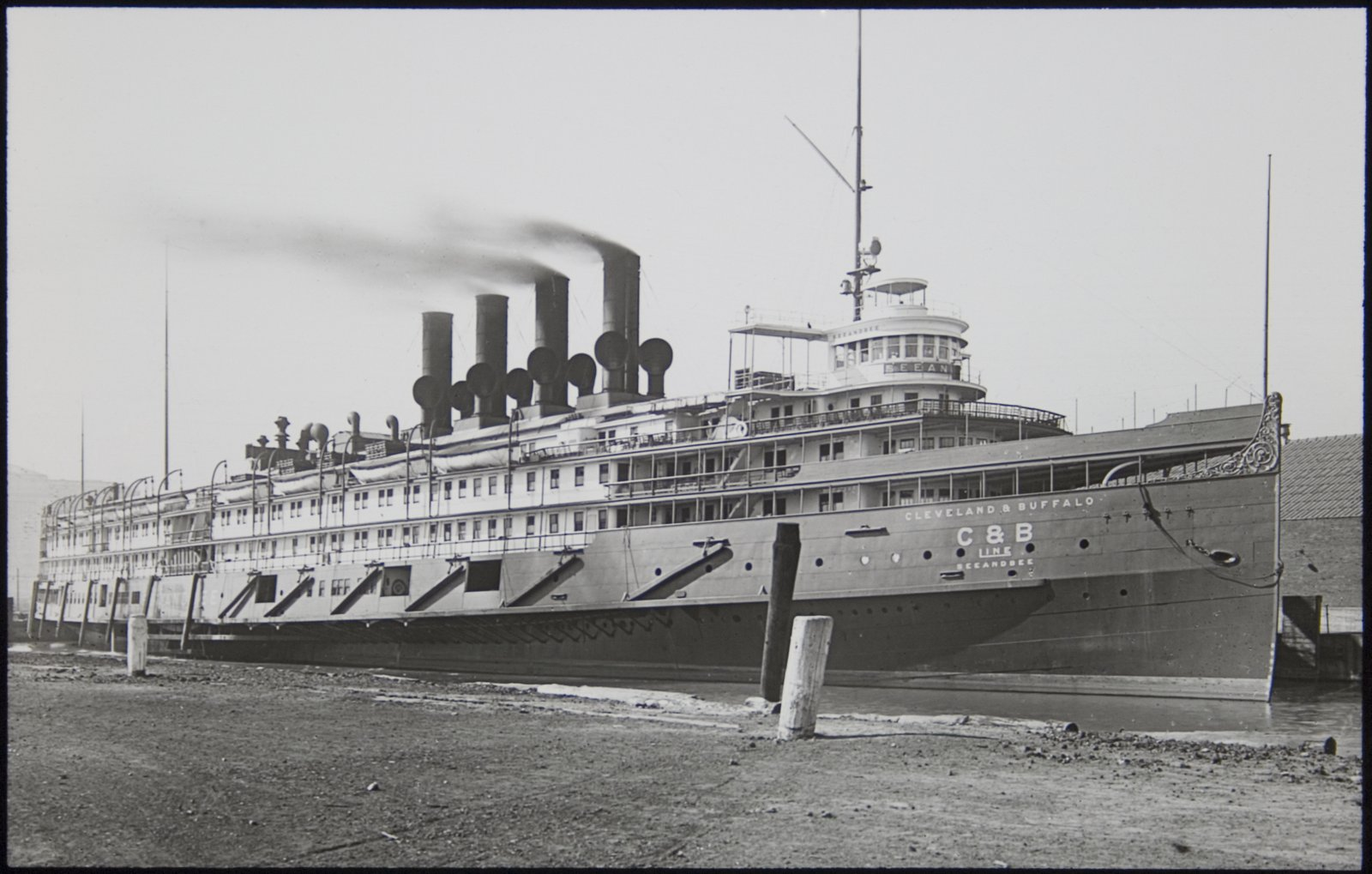
Seeandbee in August 1919

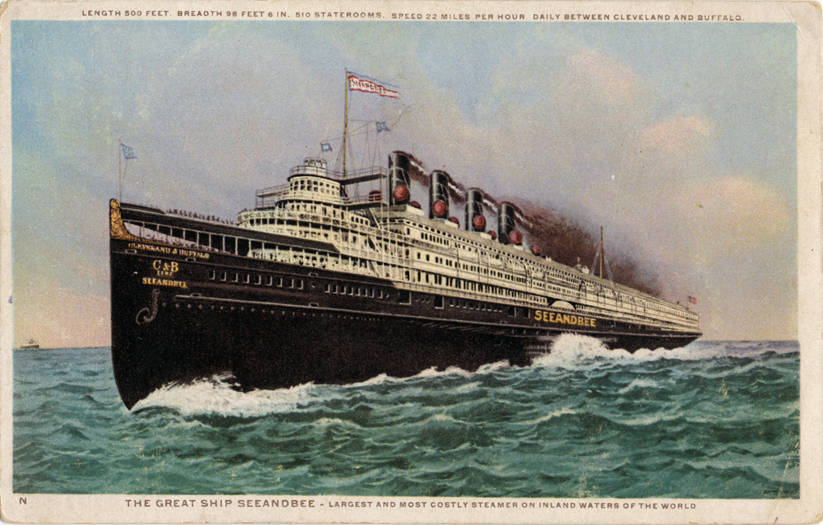
A postcard of the Seeandbee

=== Hull and engineering ===
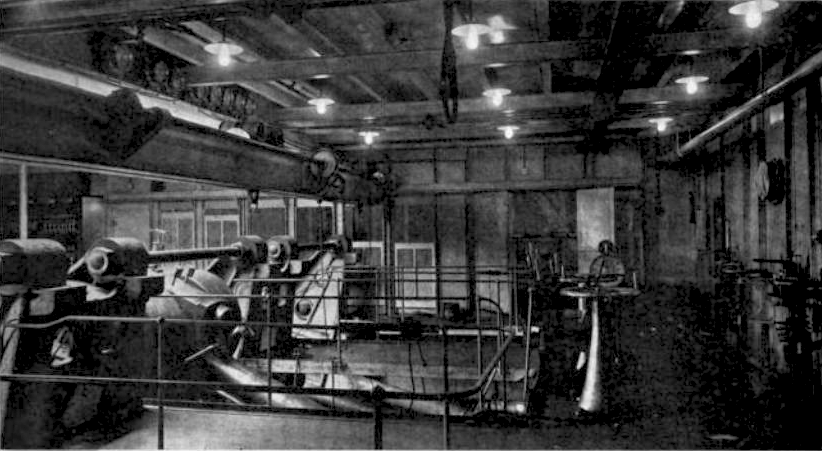
Seeandbee engine room view of starting platform.

The ship's dimensions as built were 500 ft (152.4 m) length overall, 485 ft (147.8 m) between perpendiculars, 58 ft (17.7 m) molded hull beam, 97 ft 8 in (29.8 m) extreme beam over guards with extreme depth of hull at stem being 30 ft 4 in (9.2 m) and 23 ft 6 in (7.2 m) molded depth. The hull was entirely steel with a double bottom extending almost 365 ft (111.3 m) containing water ballast and divided lengthwise with a watertight bulkhead and by transverse bulkheads into fourteen compartments. Above that 3 ft (0.9 m) ballast compartment the ship was divided by eleven watertight bulkheads extending from keel to main deck with hydraulic doors operated from the engine room. In total there were seven decks: tank top, orlop, main, promenade, gallery, upper and dome. Steel was used to the promenade deck with fire protection for beams above that level and fireproof doors provided compartmentalization and steel fire curtains in cargo spaces. For fire alarm purposes, the vessel was divided into fifty sections with fire hydrants spaced so that permanently attached hoses reached every point in the vessel and an extensive sprinkler system.

Propulsion was by an inclined, three-cylinder steam engine below the main deck with only the main bearing tops, upper parts of the valves and handling levers above the main deck. The engine was unique in using a Walschaert gear, normally used on locomotives, to drive a Corliss gear for the two low-pressure cylinders and the poppet type valves on the high-pressure portion. The speed guarantee of 22 miles per hour (35.4 km/h; 19.1 kn) was met by the engine's 12,000 ihp (8,900 kW) at 31 revolutions per minute. (Note: Inland and river vessels often used miles per hour instead of the oceanic knots.) The high-pressure cylinder, 66 in (167.6 cm) in diameter, was centered between the two low-pressure cylinders of 96 in (243.8 cm) diameter with steam provided by six single ended and three double ended Scotch boilers forward of the engine room delivering steam at 165 psi (1.1 MPa). The single ended boilers were 14 ft (4.3 m) inside diameter by 10 ft 6 in (3.2 m) length and the double ended boilers were 14 ft 2.1875 in (4.3 m) mean diameter by 20 ft 5.5 in (6.2 m) length. The two 32 ft 9 in (10.0 m) diameter paddle wheels each had eleven steel buckets 14 ft 10 in (4.5 m) long by 5 ft (1.5 m) wide. Due to the restricted channels at both Cleveland and Buffalo additional maneuvering capability was required and a bow rudder and steam steering engine were provided.

Washed air ventilation units provided fresh air for all interior spaces with exhaust fans for removal of foul air. Three steam turbines drove generator sets providing electricity for 4,500 electric lights, including the largest searchlight (32 in; 81 cm) on the Great Lakes, and the ship was extensively electrified for auxiliary functions. Over 500 telephones were on board, with one in every stateroom, the officer's quarters and booths in passenger areas as part of a public system and a private system for use in ship operations.

== History ==
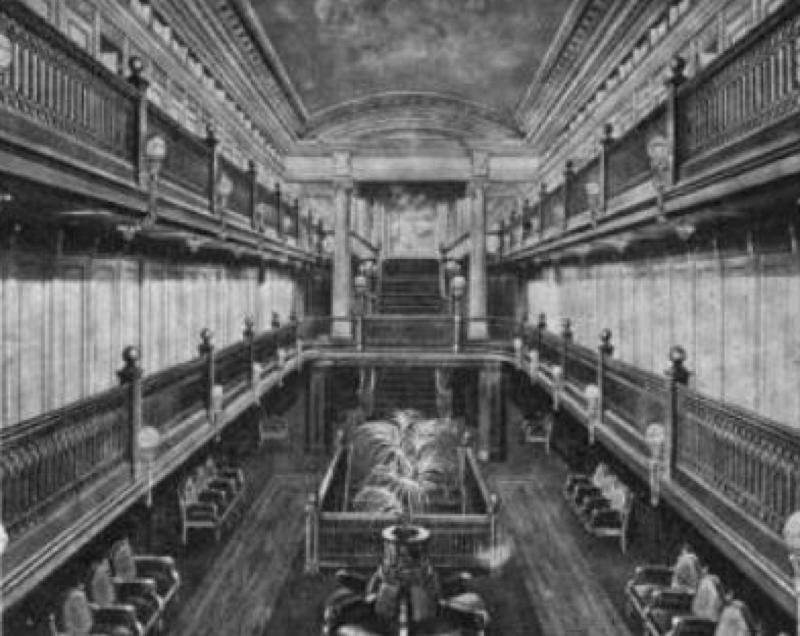
View of Seeandbee main saloon

The name for the ship Seeandbee, based on the initials of the company that owned the ship, was chosen by means of a contest in which the winner received a prize of $10.00 (Note: equivalent to $334 in 2025) and a free trip on the ship. When completed, Seeandbee left Detroit the morning of 19 June 1913 on its maiden voyage. After stopping in Cleveland at the East 9th Street pier, Seeandbee then headed to Buffalo arriving the next morning to what was called a "Royal Welcome". While at Buffalo, the ship was open for free tours and a reception was held for the Buffalo Chamber of Commerce by the Cleveland Chamber of Commerce who had chartered the trip.

In addition to the scheduled operation between Cleveland and Buffalo, the vessel made special cruises to Detroit and Chicago along with other ports on the Great Lakes. In an advertisement dated 12 June 1914, the cost to travel between Cleveland to Buffalo on Seeandbee was touted to be less than a railroad ticket and that any railroad ticket for travel between the two cities would be accepted. During August 1930, C & B Transit issued a $10,000 (Note: equivalent to $192,729 in 2025) challenge to prove that Seeandbee was the "fastest on the lakes" but the challenge was never accepted by the other steamship companies. For the 1933 Chicago World's Fair, Seeandbee was scheduled to make a number of all-inclusive trips that summer.

Seeandbee was used as a hotel for approximately 842 pilgrims during the 7th National Eucharistic Congress in Cleveland in September 1935.

Prior to the start of the 1937 sailing season, Seeandbee underwent refitting. A new large ballroom was constructed on the upper deck, stateroom space was converted into parlors, and new showers, baths and beauty parlors were added to the ship.

Due to heavy losses in 1938, Cleveland and Buffalo Transit was liquidated in 1939, with the vessel being acquired by the Chicago-based C&B Transit Company. Seeandbee was used for short excursion trips as well. A 1940 newspaper article from Buffalo, New York shows that Seeandbee was booked by the local Democratic Party office for their annual "lake cruise and party rendezvous" from 1 p.m. to midnight.

== Naval service ==
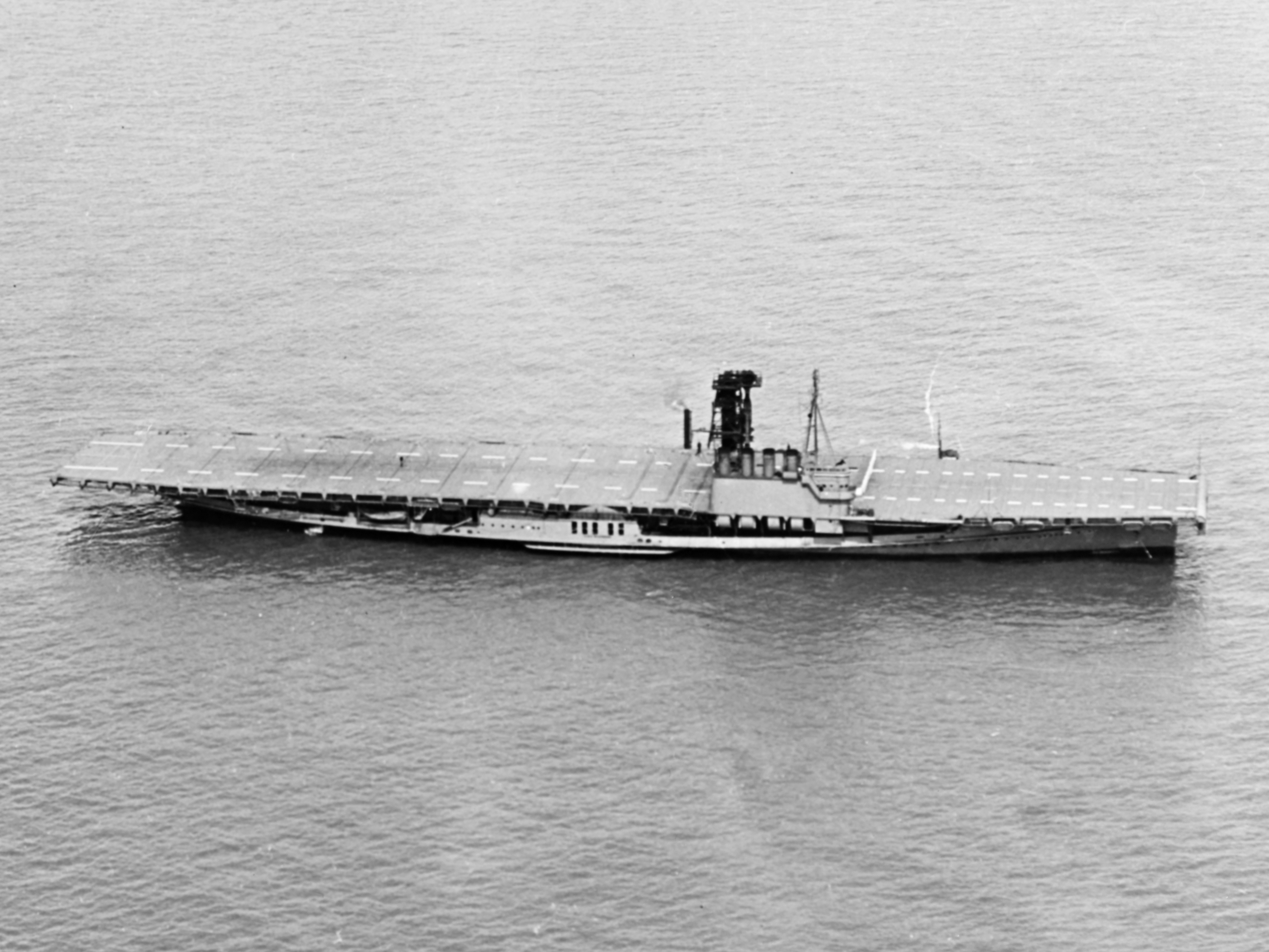
Wolverine at anchor in Lake Michigan on 6 April 1943.

In 1941, prior to American entry into World War II, the need to be able to train pilots in aircraft carrier takeoffs and landings became an area of concern. There were a limited number of aircraft carriers available and these were assigned to front line duties. Commander Richard F. Whitehead made the initial proposal of converting lake steamers into training aircraft carriers but his idea was met with little interest. Following the Japanese attack on Pearl Harbor, his proposal was expedited by Chief of Naval Operations Admiral Ernest J. King. The option of using a lake steamer decided upon for a number of reasons including that a new ship wouldn't have to be built from scratch which would free up resources for other ship production and that a suitable size ocean vessel or an existing aircraft carrier was too wide to fit through the Welland Canal.

=== Refit ===
The Navy acquired Seeandbee from the C&B Transit Company on 12 March 1942, for the price of $756,500 and designated her an unclassified miscellaneous auxiliary vessel, IX-64. Seeandbee's existing superstructure was removed at Cleveland, Ohio, and the ship was towed to Buffalo to undergo refitting by the American Ship Building Company. From 6 May 1942, a 550 ft (170 m) long wooden flight deck was installed, a new bridge island was built, arresting cables were installed, and the funnels were rerouted to the starboard side of the ship, making Wolverine the only aircraft carrier to have four funnels. Unable to fit in a dry dock due to its size, the ship was refitted while still afloat. At its peak, a crew of 1,250 men worked round the clock and it was reported that 45 miles of welding as well as 57,000 bolts with washers and grommets were used during the refit operations. A Coast Guard substation was set up to provide security for the work and no pedestrians or vehicles were allowed near the work site.

The name Wolverine was approved on 2 August 1942, with the ship being commissioned on 12 August 1942 at Buffalo, New York. The commissioning ceremony was closed to the public and was attended by only certain dignitaries, the new crew and roughly five hundred workmen who were still on board. Intended to operate on Lake Michigan, IX-64 received her name because the state of Michigan is known as the Wolverine State.

=== Assignment ===
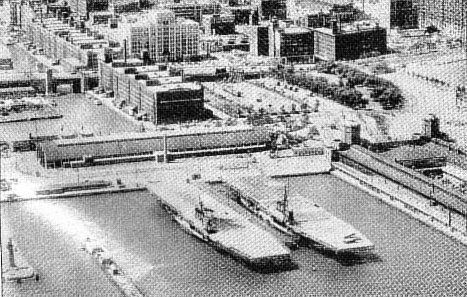
Wolverine and Sable moored in Chicago, c. 1944

Wolverine began her new assignment in January 1943 stationed at Chicago, Illinois, at what came to be called Navy Pier assigned to the 9th Naval District Carrier Qualification Training Unit. Her sister ship, USS Sable, joined Wolverine in May 1943, and the two ships began to be casually referred to as the "Corn Belt Fleet". By 7 May 1943, it was reported that the 7,000th successful landing had been made on Wolverine.

In conjunction with NAS Glenview, the two paddle-wheelers afforded critical training in basic carrier operations to thousands of pilots and also to smaller numbers of Landing Signal Officers (LSOs). Wolverine and Sable enabled the pilots and LSOs to learn to handle take-offs and landings on a real flight deck. Sable and Wolverine were a far cry from front-line carriers, but they accomplished the Navy's purpose: qualifying naval aviators fresh from operational flight training in carrier landings.

Wolverine and Sable were not true aircraft carriers and they had certain limitations. One was that there were no elevators or hangar decks to store damaged aircraft. If all the storage spaces on the flight deck were filled with damaged aircraft, the day's operations were over and the carriers headed back to their pier in Chicago. Landing aircraft on calm days became another problem for the carriers. Neither carrier was able to generate sufficient speed to meet the "wind over deck" (WOD) landing minimums for aircraft such as F6F Hellcats, F4U Corsairs, TBM Avengers and SBD Dauntlesses. When there was little or no wind on Lake Michigan, operations often had to be curtailed. Occasionally, when low-wind conditions persisted for several days and the pool of waiting aviators started to bunch up, the Navy turned to an alternate system of qualifications. The pilots qualified in SNJ Texans – even though most pilots had last flown the SNJ four or five months earlier.

=== Decommissioning and disposal ===
Once the war was over, the need for such training ships came to an end. The Navy decommissioned Wolverine on 7 November 1945; three weeks later, on 28 November, she was struck from the Naval Vessel Register. Wolverine was then transferred to the War Shipping Administration on 14 November 1945. (Note: DANFS has the date as 26 November 1947, but that is after the documented sale on 21 November 1947 by the Maritime Administration (MARAD). MARAD shows the date of Navy action as 14 November 1945 after which the ship was offered for sale.) The ship was offered to U.S. citizens for either U.S. flag operation or scrapping and sold 21 November 1947 to A. F. Wagner Iron Works of Milwaukee, Wisconsin, for $46,789 (Note: equivalent to $674,640 in 2025) to be scrapped.

=== Legal case ===
The Department of Justice brought a case regarding the sale of Seeandbee to the U.S. Government. The case involved claims that the value of the ship was knowingly inflated by $275,000 (Note: equivalent to $5,418,788 in 2025) by using false statements regarding the amount of time the C&B Transit Company owned Seeandbee, false statements regarding the amount invested in the ship and submitting falsified records that inflated the earnings produced from operating Seeandbee. The former president of the C&B Transit Company plead nolo contendere and was fined $5,000. (Note: equivalent to $89,418 in 2025) The government was able to recover the $275,000 from five former stockholders of the C&B Transit Company in addition to $235,981 (Note: equivalent to $4,220,178 in 2025) in taxes that had been paid on capital gains.

== Awards ==
USS Wolverine received the following awards for her World War II service.

American Campaign Medal	World War II Victory Medal

== Bibliography ==
- Case Western Reserve University (13 May 1998). "SEEANDBEE - The Encyclopedia of Cleveland History". Encyclopedia of Cleveland History. Case Western Reserve University.
- Colton, T (22 September 2014). "Detroit Shipbuilding, Detroit MI and Wyandotte MI". ShipbuildingHistory. Archived from the original on 20 December 2014.
- Interstate Commerce Commission (1916). "Appenxix, Exhibit No. 1 (Rates Via Rail-and-Lake Routes)". Interstate Commerce Commission Reports: Reports and Decisions of the Interstate Commerce Commission (December 1915 to January 1916). XXXVII. Washington: Government Printing Office.
- International Marine Engineering (1913). "Side Wheel Passenger Steamer See-and-Bee". International Marine Engineering. XVIII (6). New York: Aldrish Publishing Company: 252–258.
- Maritime Administration. "Wolverine (IX-64)". Ship History Database Vessel Status Card. U.S. Department of Transportation, Maritime Administration. Archived from the original on 21 December 2014.
- Naval History and Heritage Command. "Sable". Dictionary of American Naval Fighting Ships. Naval History and Heritage Command. Archived from the original on 14 March 2004.
- Naval History and Heritage Command. "Wolverine". Dictionary of American Naval Fighting Ships. Naval History and Heritage Command. Archived from the original on 21 June 2004.
- Newell, F. H.; Drayer, C. E. (1916). Engineering as a Career. New York: D. Van Nostrand Company. LCCN 16002426.
- Silverstone, Paul H (1965). US Warships of World War II. Annapolis, Maryland: Naval Institute Press. ISBN 0-87021-773-9.
- Truebe, Carl E. & Wetherhorn, Aryeh (2007). "Question 33/04: Training Carriers Sable (IX-81) and Wolverine (IX-64)". Warship International. XLIV (4): 332–334. ISSN 0043-0374.
- Wilde, Douglas B. (2006). "Question 33/04: Training Carriers Sable (IX-81) and Wolverine (IX-64)". Warship International. XLIII (4): 354–360. ISSN 0043-0374.
