= Frank E. Kirby =

American ship designer (1849 – 1929)

Frank E. Kirby (July 1, 1849 – August 25, 1929) was a naval architect in the Detroit, Michigan, area in the early 20th century. He is widely regarded as one of the greatest naval architects in American history.

== Biography ==
Kirby was a marine engineer and architect. "He prepared plans and specifications for the refitting of the Grant, Sherman, Sheridan, Logan, and Thomas, and [was] a consulting engineer... of the transport branch of the Quartermaster's Department." Kirby mostly specialized in paddle-wheel and steamship design. Perhaps his most famous vessel, Tashmoo, was a paddle-wheeler launched on New Year's Eve 1899. She was constructed by the Detroit Shipbuilding Company in Wyandotte, Michigan, for the White Star Steamship Company of Detroit. The 306-foot vessel made her maiden voyage on June 9, 1900. She would become one of the best known and most beloved excursion steamers on the Great Lakes.

Kirby also is well renowned for his design of the "Bob-Lo boats" the Columbia and the Ste. Claire. Boblo Island was a major amusement park destination for residents of southeast Michigan and southern Ontario throughout most of the 20th century. He is also considered the father of modern ice-breaking technology. He designed the D&C Navigation Co.’s armada of stately night boats, including the City of Detroit III.

== Kirby designs ==
- Steamer Canadiana
- Steamer Chief Wawatam
- Steamer City of Detroit III
- Steamer City of Erie
- Steamer Columbia
- Steamer SS Chicora
- Steamer Greater Detroit (1924)
- Steamer Greater Buffalo (1924), rebuilt in 1942 as a training aircraft carrier, USS Sable (IX-81), which trained a future US President, George H. W. Bush
- Steamer Put-In-Bay
- Steamer Ste. Claire
- Steamer Tashmoo
- Steamer Seeandbee, the largest and most expensive lake cruiser at the time, later transformed into the USS Wolverine (IX-64), a training aircraft carrier that served in tandem with the USS Sable.
- Steamer Washington Irving
