= Charlevoix (disambiguation) =

Charlevoix is a region in the province of Quebec in Canada.

Charlevoix may also refer to:

== People with the surname ==
- Pierre François Xavier de Charlevoix (1682–1761), French Jesuit and explorer in New France, after whom most of the place names are named, either directly or indirectly

== Places ==
=== Canada ===
- Charlevoix, an historical and cultural region in Quebec which contains the following:
  - Charlevoix Regional County Municipality
  - Charlevoix-Est Regional County Municipality
  - Charlevoix impact structure

==== Electoral districts ====
- Charlevoix–Côte-de-Beaupré, provincial electoral district in Quebec
- Charlevoix (provincial electoral district), former provincial district in Quebec
- Charlevoix (federal electoral district), former federal district in Quebec
- Charlevoix—Saguenay (federal electoral district), former federal electoral district in Quebec

=== United States ===
- Charlevoix, Michigan
- Charlevoix County, Michigan, which contains the following:
  - Charlevoix Township, Michigan
  - Lake Charlevoix, Michigan
  - Charlevoix South Pier Light Station, Michigan

== Transportation ==
=== Canada ===
- Charlevoix station (Montreal), a Montreal Metro station in Montreal, Quebec
- Charlevoix Airport, Charlevoix region, Quebec
- Charlevoix Railway, Charlevoix region, Quebec

=== United States ===
- Charlevoix station (Michigan), a former station in Charlevoix, Michigan
- Charlevoix Municipal Airport, Michigan
