= List of shipwrecks in June 1887 =

The list of shipwrecks in June 1887 includes ships sunk, foundered, grounded, or otherwise lost during June 1887.

== 2 June ==
List of shipwrecks: 2 June 1887
Ship	State	Description
Senegal	United Kingdom	The steamship was wrecked at Tabou, Ivory Coast. Her crew were rescued. The wreck was pillaged by the local inhabitants. She was on a voyage from Calabar, Nigeria to Liverpool, Lancashire.

== 4 June ==
List of shipwrecks: 4 June 1887
Ship	State	Description
Celeste Marie	France	The schooner collided with the steamship Solis (Spain) and sank in the English Channel off Beachy Head, Sussex, United Kingdom with the loss of three of her four crew.
Lamport	United Kingdom	The steamship departed from Bombay, India for Palermo, Sicily, Italy. No further trace, reported missing.
Tern	United Kingdom	The steamship collided with the barque Hamburg (Germany) and sank off The Smalls, Wales with the loss of five of her twenty crew. Survivors were rescued by the steamship Topic (United Kingdom). Tern was on a voyage from Liverpool, Lancashire to Rotterdam, South Holland, Netherlands.

== 5 June ==
List of shipwrecks: 5 June 1887
Ship	State	Description
Ann	United Kingdom	The ketch was driven ashore at the Birling Gap, Sussex.
Florence Nightingale	United Kingdom	The ship collided with the steamship Clan Sinclair (United Kingdom) and was abandoned in the Irish Sea west of the Isle of Man. Her crew were rescued by Clan Sinclair. Florence Nightingale was on a voyage from Swansea, Glamorgan to Londonderry. She was subsequently towed in to Greenock, Renfrewshire by the steamship Bonita (Spain).
Iscult	United Kingdom	The yacht was driven ashore at the Birling Gap.

== 7 June ==
List of shipwrecks: 7 June 1887
Ship	State	Description
Amoor	United Kingdom	The ship was wrecked on the English Bank, in the River Plate. Her crew were rescued.
Elsa	Germany	The barque collided with the steamship Marchese de Mudela (Spain) in the English Channel off then Royal Sovereign Lightship ( Trinity House) and was abandoned. Her eleven crew were rescued by Marchese de Mudela. Elsa was subsequently taken in tow by the tugs Crusader and Pioneer (both United Kingdom) but consequently sank 8 nautical miles (15 km) south of the Hooks Sandbank.
Monarch	United Kingdom	The steam trawler was driven ashore on the Roker Rocks, on the coast of Northumberland.

== 8 June ==
List of shipwrecks: 8 June 1887
Ship	State	Description
Bavington	United Kingdom	The steamship foundered off Ouessant, Finistère, France. All 24 people on board were rescued by the steamship Nettlesworth (United Kingdom). Bavington was on a voyage from Cartagena, Spain to Middlesbrough, Yorkshire.
Castleford	United Kingdom	The ship struck the Crebawethans, Isles of Scilly, in dense fog, and led to some of her cargo of 450 cattle being landed on Annet and staying there for up to ten days. Some of the cattle were shipped to Falmouth, Cornwall, England, and dead steers later washed up as far away as Penzance and Lelant, Cornwall. Castleford was on a voyage from Montreal, Quebec, Canada to London.
Redan	United Kingdom	The Thames barge collided with the dredger No. 1 (United Kingdom) and sank in the River Thames at East Greenwich, Middlesex.

== 9 June ==
List of shipwrecks: 9 June 1887
Ship	State	Description
Caledonia	United Kingdom	The schooner was holed by her anchor and was beached at the Mumbles, Glamorgan.

== 11 June ==
List of shipwrecks: 11 June 1887
Ship	State	Description
Alexander William	United Kingdom	The ship was run down by the steamship Caxton (United Kingdom) and sank in the River Mersey at Egremont, Lancashire. She was on a voyage from Liverpool, Lancashire to Belfast, County Antrim.
Goodhit	United States	The steam barge caught fire and was beached on Grosse Island below Ballard's where she burned to the water's edge.

== 12 June ==
List of shipwrecks: 12 June 1887
Ship	State	Description
Mourino	United Kingdom	The steamship caught fire at sea whilst on a voyage from Hull, Yorkshire to Odesa, Russia. She put in to Malta and the fire was extinguished.

== 13 June ==
List of shipwrecks: 13 June 1887
Ship	State	Description
Gulliver	United Kingdom	The steamship was wrecked on The Smalls, Cornwall. Her crew were rescued.

== 14 June ==
List of shipwrecks: 14 June 1887
Ship	State	Description
Clio, and Elmfield	United Kingdom	The steamship Clio collided with the steamship Elmfield (United Kingdom) off the Bull Rock. Both vessels were severely damaged. Clio put back to Bristol, Gloucestershire. Elmfield put in to Penarth, Glamorgan.

== 15 June ==
List of shipwrecks: 15 June 1887
Ship	State	Description
Champlain	United States	The steamship caught fire at the mouth of Grand Traverse Bay near Fisherman Island, off Charlevoix, Michigan and was run aground where she burned to the water's edge.. Approximately 30 crew and passengers were killed The wreck was salvaged, completely rebuilt and returned to service as City of Charlevoix.

== 16 June ==
List of shipwrecks: 16 June 1887
Ship	State	Description
Madrid	United Kingdom	The steamship departed from Norfolk, Virginia, United States for Dublin. No further trace, reported missing.

== 20 June ==
List of shipwrecks: 20 June 1887
Ship	State	Description
Hydaspes	United Kingdom	The steamship was driven ashore in the Gulf of Suez at "Ras Mahomed". Her passengers were taken off by the steamship Aida ( (Ottoman Empire) Egypt).
Kate	United Kingdom	The ketch foundered off Southsea, Hampshire. Her crew survived.
P. H. Walley	United States	The steam barge capsized and sank in a storm in Lake Erie with the loss of eleven of the fifteen people on board.
Philip Walter	United States	The steamship was struck by a cyclone between Cleveland and Marblehead, Ohio and sank due to cargo shift. Lost with all eight hands, a mix of men and women.

== 21 June ==
|- |Onward |United Kingdom |The Thames barge was run into by the steamship Algoma (United Kingdom+) and sank at Charlton, Kent with the loss of a crew member.

List of shipwrecks: 21 June 1887
Ship	State	Description

== 22 June ==
List of shipwrecks: 22 June 1887
Ship	State	Description
Erycina	United Kingdom	The ship was damaged by fire at Swansea, Glamorgan.
Otto and Emma	Germany	The schooner was driven ashore at the Coal House Fort, Essex, United Kingdom. She was on a voyage from London, United Kingdom to Hamburg.
Pelican	United Kingdom	The steamship ran aground at the Coal House Fort. She was refloated.

== 23 June ==
List of shipwrecks: 23 June 1887
Ship	State	Description
Dunskeig	United Kingdom	The full-rigged ship was wrecked at Tierra del Fuego, Chile with the loss of fourteen of her 31 crew. She was on a voyage from London to San Francisco, California, United States.

== 26 June ==
List of shipwrecks: 26 June 1887
Ship	State	Description
Magellanes	Argentina	The transport ship struck a rock and foundered at Puerto Deseado. All 200 people on board survived.

== 27 June ==
List of shipwrecks: 27 June 1887
Ship	State	Description
Star of Scotia	United Kingdom	The full-rigged ship was wrecked on Bull Point, Falkland Islands with the loss of seven lives. She was on a voyage from San Francisco, California, United States to Queenstown, County Cork and London.

== 28 June ==
List of shipwrecks: 28 June 1887
Ship	State	Description
Soudan	France	The steamship was wrecked on the Hamstone, off the coast of Devon, United Kingdom. Her eight passengers were taken off by a yacht. Soudan was on a voyage from Senegal to Dunkirk, Nord. She was refloated and taken in tow by tow tugs, one of which was Raleigh (United Kingdom) but she sank off Salcombe, Devon. Her crew and a Coastguard officer on board were rescued.

== Unknown date ==
List of shipwrecks: Unknown date in June 1887
Ship	State	Description
Aave	Norway	The schooner was abandoned at sea. Her crew were rescued. She was on a voyage from Bo'ness, Lothian, United Kingdom to Saint Petersburg, Russia.
Ada	United Kingdom	The ship ran aground on the Brake Sand. She was refloated and assisted in to Ramsgate, Kent.
Adriatic	United Kingdom	The barque foundered in the Atlantic Ocean. Her crew were rescued by the steamship Egypt (United Kingdom). Adriatic was on a voyage from Greenock, Renfrewshire to Quebec City, Canada.
Anna	Germany	The schooner was driven ashore and wrecked at Thisted, Denmark.
Ashfield	United Kingdom	The steamship ran aground at Goeree, Zeeland, Netherlands. She was refloated and taken in to Hellevoetsluis, Zeeland.
Caspian	United Kingdom	The steamship was driven ashore. She was refloated and taken in to Halifax, Nova Scotia, Canada in a leaky condition.
Caterina Schiaffino	Italy	The ship was abandoned at sea. She was on a voyage from Cyprus to Hull, Yorkshire, United Kingdom.
Chowan	Flag unknown	The ship ran aground on a reef off Bermuda. She was on a voyage from Bermuda to Rio de Janeiro, Brazil. She was refloated and put back to Bermuda in a severely leaky condition.
City of Boston	United States	The ship was wrecked off the Bahamas. She was on a voyage from Pensacola, Florida to Liverpool, Lancashire, United Kingdom.
Clara	United Kingdom	The schooner collided with the steamship Brier (United Kingdom) in Lough Foyle and was severely damaged.
Constantia	Norway	The barque was wrecked on the Colorado Reefs, off the coast of Cuba. She was on a voyage from Trinidad, Cuba to New York, United States.
European	United Kingdom	The steamship ran aground on the Meloria Bank, off Livorno, Italy.
Gamecock	United Kingdom	The steamship ran aground on the Shingle Bank, in the Solent. She was on a voyage from Penzance, Cornwall to Southampton, Hampshire.
Gina	Austria-Hungary	The barque ran aground off Martín García Island, Uruguay and was wrecked. She was on a voyage from Cardiff, Glamorgan, United Kingdom to Campana, Argentina.
Garrison	United Kingdom	The ship struck the Runnel Stone. She was consequently beached at the Mumbles, Glamorgan.
Godiva	United Kingdom	The ship was driven ashore on the coast of India in a cyclone. She was later refloated and taken in to Calcutta for repairs.
Gustafva	Russia	The barque was driven ashore on Saltholm, Denmark. She was on a voyage from Hailuto, Grand Duchy of Finland to Antwerp, Belgium.
Hercules	United Kingdom	The tug was holed by an anchor and sank at Cardiff.
Jumna	United Kingdom	The steamship caught fire at Aden, Aden Governorate. The fire was extinguished.
Juno	United Kingdom	The ship ran aground in the River Plate at Rio de Janeiro, Brazil and sprang a severe leak. She was on a voyage from Penedo, Brazil to Liverpool.
Liffey	United Kingdom	The steamship was driven ashore at Nash Point, Glamorgan. She was later refloated and taken in to Cardiff.
Lord Athlumney	United Kingdom	The steamship was wrecked. There were at least twelve survivors.
Nefert	Denmark	The schooner was driven ashore at Pernambuco, Brazil. She was on a voyage from Rio de Janeiro to Maceió.
Neto	United Kingdom	The steamship caught fire at Pernambuco. The fire was extinguished.
Ouachita	United Kingdom	The ship ran aground in the River Mersey. She was on a voyage from Cork to Liverpool, Lancashire. She was later refloated and taken in to Liverpool.
Providence	United States	The steamship was driven ashore at Bristol Ferry, Rhode Island.
Puffin	United Kingdom	The yacht was severely damaged by fire at Havre de Grâce, Seine-Inférieure, France.
Ranee	Straits Settlements	The steamship was driven ashore at Sarawak. She was on a voyage from Singapore to Sarawak. She was refloated and taken in to Sarawak.
Rapid	United Kingdom	The brigantine was driven ashore on "Weogenes Island", New Brunswick, Canada.
Retreiver	United Kingdom	The tug foundered in a cyclone with the loss of all but one of her crew.
Sagterland	Germany	The brigantine ran aground on the Kimmeridge Ledge, in the English Channel off the coast of Dorset, United Kingdom and was severely damaged. She was refloated on 5 July and towed in to Weymouth, Dorset in a leaky condition.
Sangvig	Norway	The schooner was driven ashore and wrecked at Blokhus, Denmark. She was on a voyage from Leith, Lothian, United Kingdom to Bisserup, Denmark.
Sir John Lawrence	United Kingdom	The steamship foundered in a cyclone with the loss of all on board, more than 730 lives.
Tekla	United Kingdom	The barque ran aground on the Flinterenne, in the Baltic Sea. She was on a voyage from Memel, Germany to Ostend, West Flanders, Belgium.
Vidette	United States	The ship foundered at sea. She was on a voyage from New York to Mobile, Alabama.
Wellington	United Kingdom	The ship was abandoned in the Atlantic Ocean. Her crew were rescued. She was on a voyage from Pensacola to Liverpool.
Unnamed	Trinity House	The lightship was driven ashore on the coast of India in a cyclone.
Unnamed	Flag unknownUnited Kingdom	The brig collided with the steamship Horn Head (United Kingdom) and was beached between Dover and Folkestone, Kent.
