= US 31–Island Lake Outlet Bridge =

Bridge in Charlevoix, Michigan, US

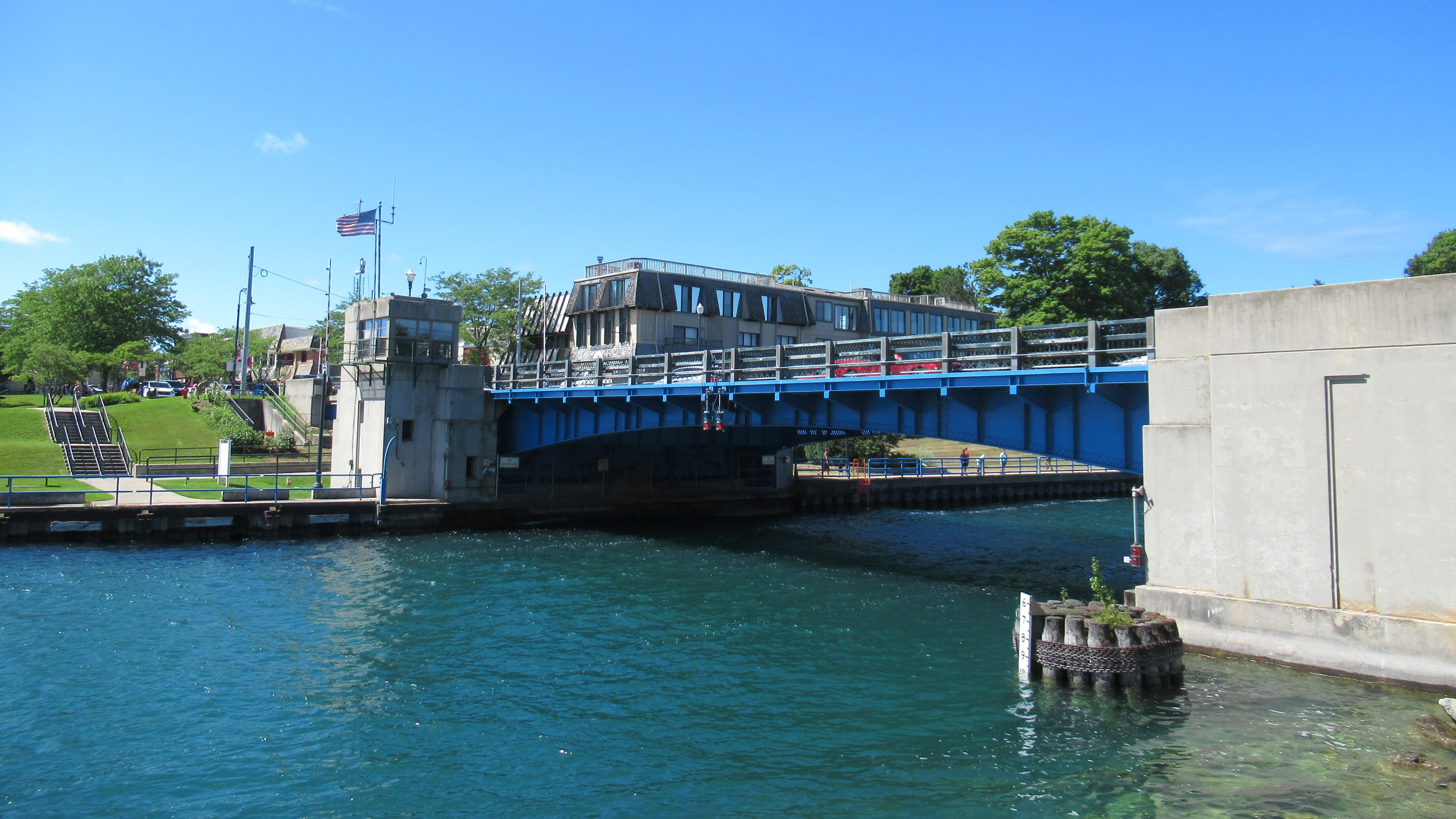
- Coordinates: 45°19′08″N 85°15′31″W
- Carries: US 31 (Bridge Street)
- Crosses: Island Lake Outlet (Pine River Channel)
- Locale: Charlevoix, Michigan
- Owner: MDOT

Characteristics
- Design: Double-leaf bascule
- Width: 56 feet (17 m)
- Longest span: 90 feet (27 m)
- No. of spans: 3
- Clearance below: 10 feet (3.0 m)

History
- Fabrication by: Mt. Vernon Bridge Company
- Construction start: 1947
- Construction end: 1949
- Opened: June 27, 1949

Location
- Interactive map of US 31–Island Lake Outlet Bridge

The US 31–Island Lake Outlet Bridge is a double-leaf bascule bridge in downtown Charlevoix in the U.S. state of Michigan. The bridge carries U.S. Highway 31 (known locally as Bridge Street) across Island Lake Outlet (also known as the Pine River Channel) that ultimately connects Lake Charlevoix to Lake Michigan.

It is the fifth bridge to cross the channel there with the first being a pedestrian-only structure that was built in the nineteenth century. The bridge was planned in 1940, but World War II delayed the acceptance of bids until 1947. Construction finished in 1949 and the bridge opened to traffic in late June of that year. The bridge is part of the National Highway System.

== History ==
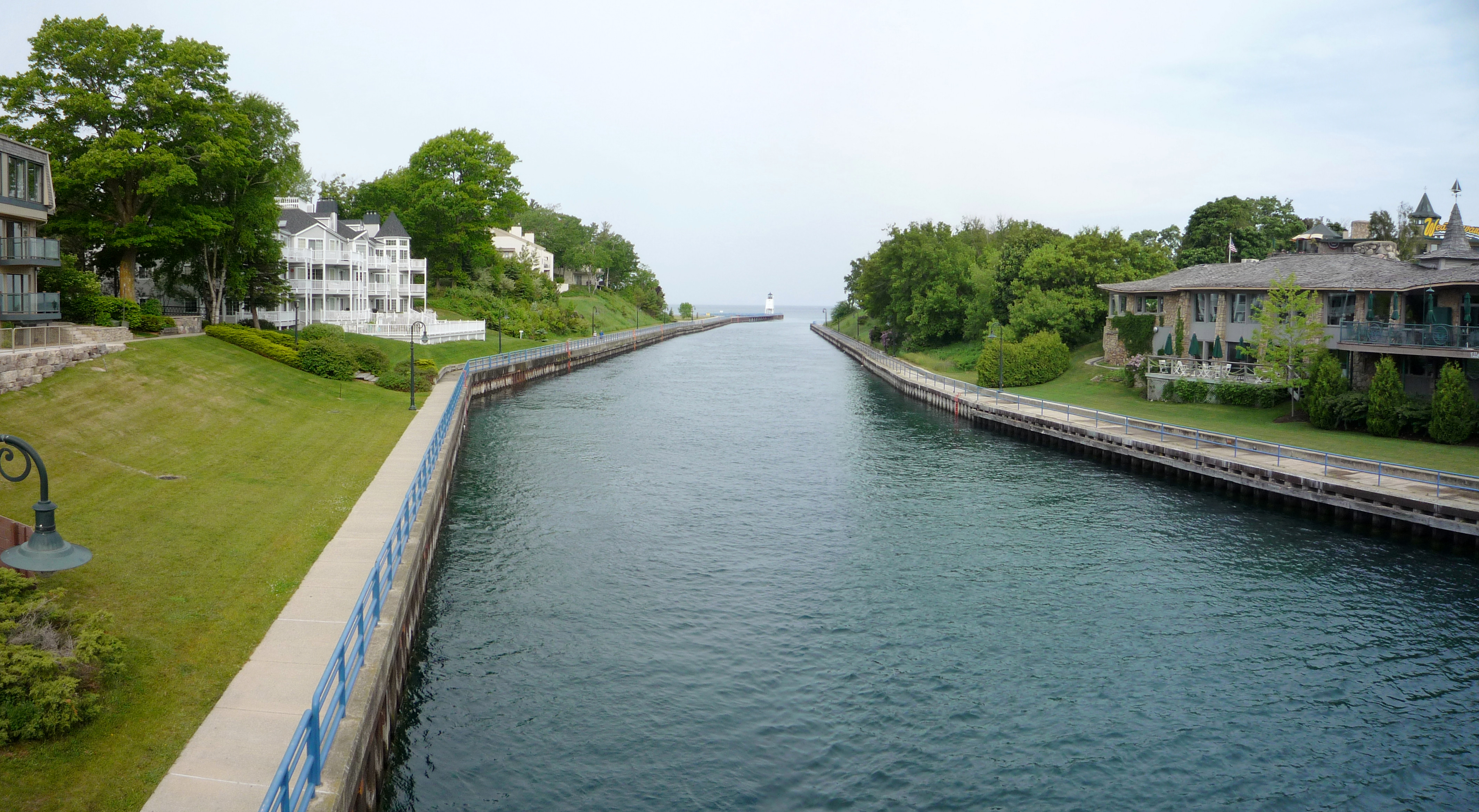
The Pine River Channel; looking toward Lake Michigan

Island Lake Outlet, also known as the Pine River Channel, was dredged in 1870 to connect Lake Michigan to Lake Charlevoix through Round Lake. A total of five bridges have crossed the channel at this location; the first was a small footbridge built in 1869. The current bridge replaced a swing truss bridge built by the city of Charlevoix in 1901.

The US 31–Island Lake Outlet Bridge was designed by the bridge division of the Michigan State Highway Department, led by George M. Foster, and by consulting engineers Haslett and Erdal. Plans were prepared in 1940, but World War II delayed the project. In January 1947, the department announced that it would accept bids beginning February 6 for the bridge's construction. Five bids were received and the contract was awarded to the lowest bidder ($697,981) submitted by L.W. Lamb Company of Holland, Michigan, and the Luedtke Engineering Company of Frankfort, Michigan.

Construction was overseen by N. F. Kinney from the state highway department and H. J. Conroy (a district bridge engineer). Fabricated steel was purchased at a cost of $270,433 from the Mt. Vernon Bridge Company of Mt. Vernon, Ohio. In late May 1947, Luedtke Engineering arrived on site with their pile driver and construction commenced. Electrical work was contracted to Lake Shore Engineering Company from Iron Mountain, Michigan. In August, a 123-foot-long swing truss bridge (37 m) was towed from Sturgeon Bay, Wisconsin, to carry traffic while the new bridge was under construction. The temporary bridge was fixed to the north bank and mounted to a pontoon on the south end to permit navigation of the channel.

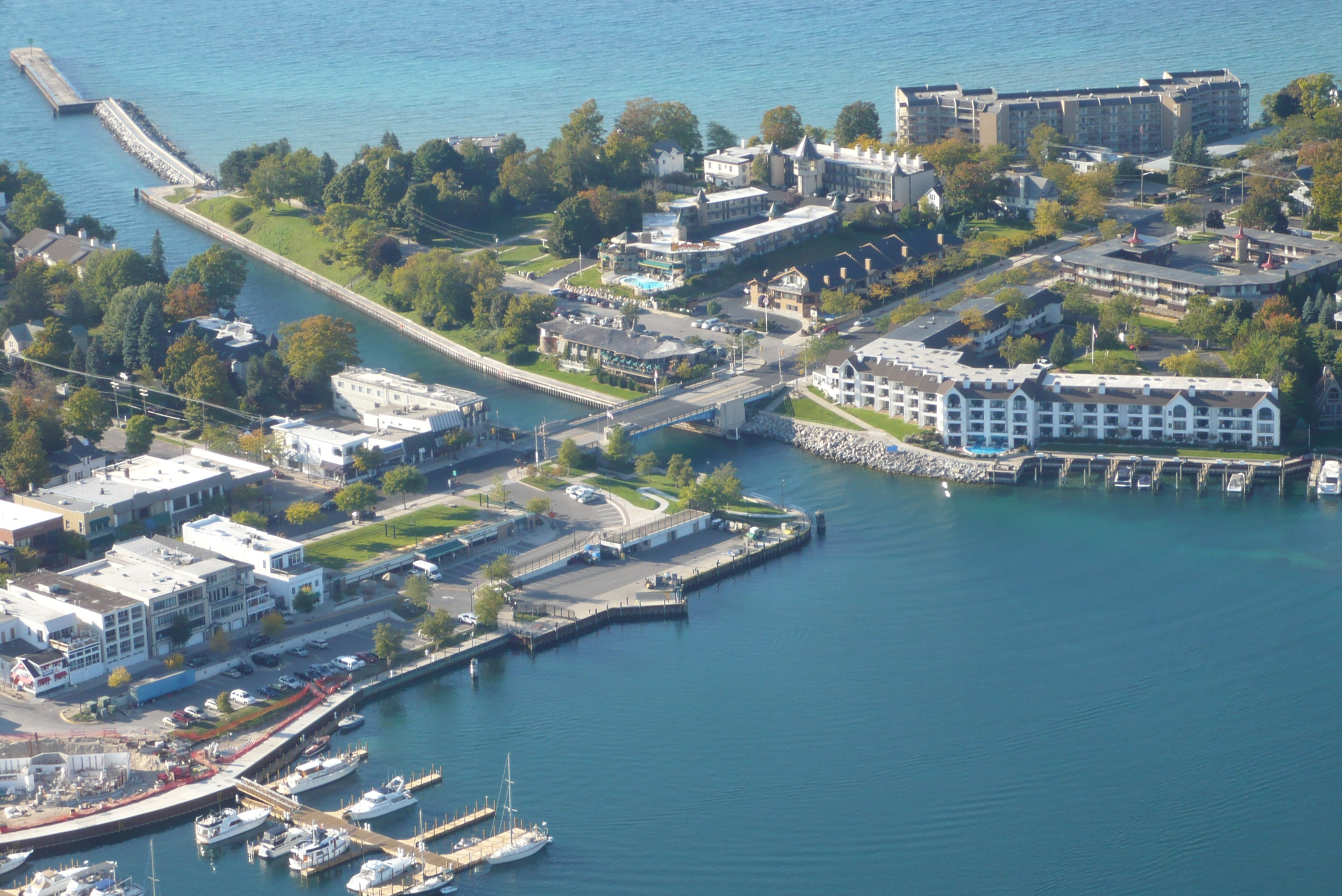
Aerial view of downtown Charlevoix with the bridge in the center

By November, construction of the north pier was underway and the south pier coffer dam was being installed. By March 1948, the north pier was ready to have its two steel bascule racks installed. However, the bronze-alloy trunnions were difficult to cast and were not satisfactory until the third attempt in September. In October, bascule girders arrived, manufactured by Mt. Vernon Bridge Company. Assembly of the south leaf was completed by early November, but the north leaf was delayed by poor weather and an insufficient number of laborers worsened by the start of deer hunting season.

By January 1949, the south counterweight had been poured and welding of the mesh road surface of the south leaf was underway, followed by work on the north side. Into spring, machinery was installed and finishing details completed. Plans for the transformer structure were approved in April and the bridge opened for traffic on June 27, 1949. On July 30, it was dedicated in memory of twenty-two locals who died fighting in World War II. The ribbon-cutting ceremony was performed by State Highway Commissioner Charles Ziegler.

The bridge originally had standard metal panels along the sidewalks. In the early 1990s, they were replaced with new railings, but these were replaced again with metal lattice railings in the mid-1990s through the efforts of Edith Gilbert.

In late 2017, a community effort was launched to light the bridge railings and walkways on either side of the channel under the bridge. The idea was developed by Paul Belding, a local resident, fisherman, and lighting engineer, shortly before his death in September 2017. After a little over a year of fundraising efforts managed by a local non-profit, Silver Linings Charlevoix, the bridge was lit with a community celebration on July 4, 2019.

The bridge is listed on an inventory of historic bridges maintained by the Michigan Department of Transportation.

== Design and operation ==
Bridge opening for the Beaver Island ferry

Bridge closing after the ferry has passed

The steel mesh road surface is 44 feet (13 m) wide with 6-foot (1.8 m) sidewalks cantilevered beyond the bridge girders. Each leaf of the bascule bridge is 45 feet (14 m) in length for a total channel width of 90 feet (27 m). Each approach is 40 feet 10 inches (12.45 m) long with a concrete road surface. The leaves and approaches are supported by concrete piers resting on steel piles; the abutments are supported by cyprus pilings.

The leaves are opened by electric motors and the machinery weighs about 50 short tons (45 long tons) and each counterweight consists of 73 short tons (65 long tons) of concrete. The operator's house is at the southeast corner of the bridge and the transformers are located to the southeast on the east bank of Round Lake. The original design included recessed barriers that would rise to block traffic from driving onto the leaves. These were abandoned and removed as part of a maintenance upgrade in the 1990s. Gates also descend and flashing lights warn oncoming traffic. When closed, there is 17 feet (5.2 m) of clearance below the bridge.

The bridge opens for recreational craft on the hour and half-hour from April through October. From April through December, the bridge opens on signal between 10 p.m. and 6 a.m. For the remainder of the year, the bridge opens on signal when given notice twelve hours in advance. For public and commercial vessels and vessels in distress, the bridge is opened as soon as possible.

== Impact ==
Because the bridge opens regularly during the summer months, it is a major source of traffic congestion. On occasion, the bridge has also been stuck in the raised position, as happened for a little over two hours in June 2004. Additional crossings have been explored, but the highly seasonal nature of the backups and financial constraints make them impractical.

Since idling cars waiting for the bridge to close result in pollution and a significant waste of fuel, June 28 to July 4, 2010, was declared "Idle Free Week" in Charlevoix.
