= Pierre François Xavier de Charlevoix =

French Jesuit priest, traveller and historian

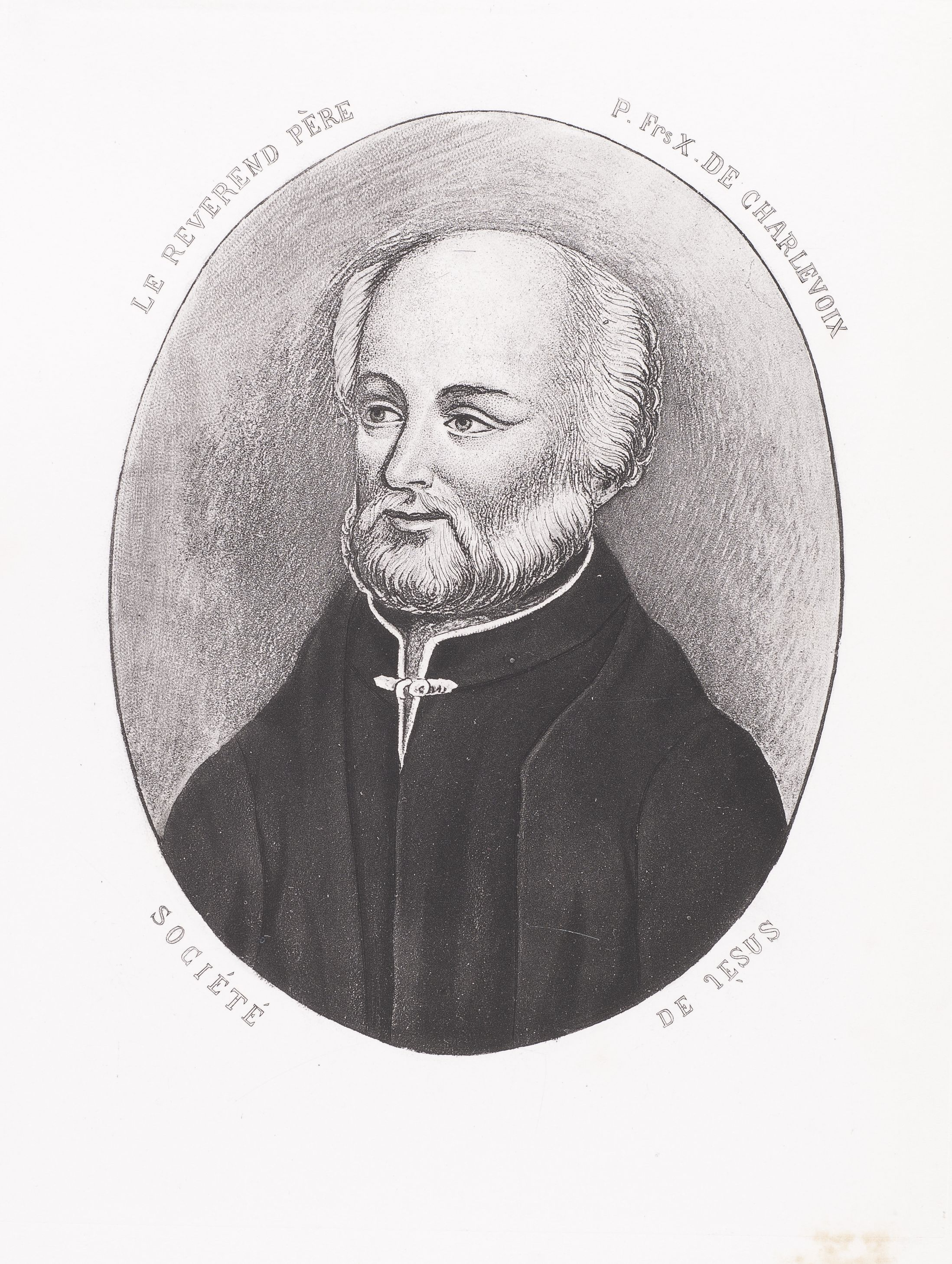
- Born: 24 or 29 October 1682; Saint-Quentin, Picardy, Kingdom of France
- Died: 1 February 1761 (aged 78); La Flèche, Maine, Kingdom of France
- Occupations: Catholic priest, professor, historian, author, explorer
- Known for: Histoire et description générale de la Nouvelle-France

Pierre François Xavier de Charlevoix, S.J. (French pronunciation: [pjɛʁ fʁɑ̃swa ɡzavje də ʃaʁləvwa]; Latin: Petrus Franciscus-Xaverius de Charlevoix; 24 or 29 October 1682 – 1 February 1761) was a French Jesuit priest, traveller, and historian, often considered the first historian of New France.

== Name ==
Charlevoix's name also appears as Pierre-François-Xavier de Charlevoix, Pierre De Charlevoix, and François-Xavier de Charlevoix.

== Life ==
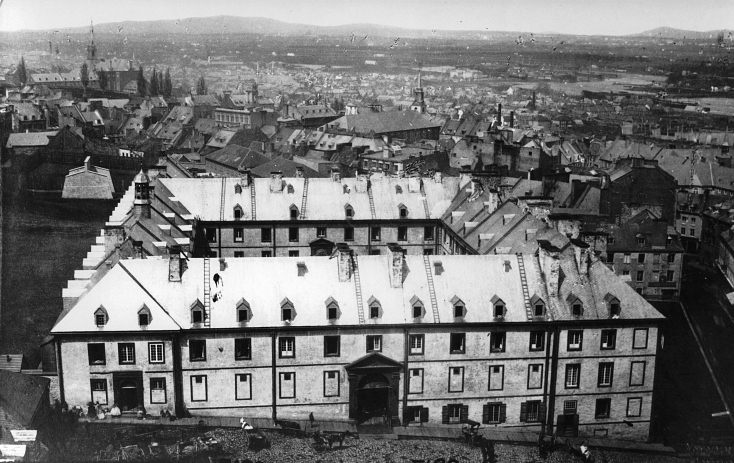
Jesuit College in Quebec

Charlevoix was born at Saint-Quentin in the province of Picardy on 24 or 29 October 1682. A descendant from a line of lesser nobility, his father held the post of deputy attorney general. His ancestors had served in positions in "great trust and high responsibility" such as legal officers, aldermen, and mayors.

On 15 September 1698, at age 16, he entered the Jesuit novitiate in Paris. He studied philosophy at the College Louis-le-Grand from 1700 to 1704. Between 1705 and 1709, Charlevoix was sent for his period of training in the Society called the regency to the Jesuit College in Quebec in the French colony of Canada, where he taught grammar. Upon completion of this stage of his training, Charlevoix returned to the College Louis-le-Grand in Paris to study theology, becoming a professor of belles lettres. One of his students was the young Voltaire, who later developed strong views on New France. (See A few acres of snow.) Charlevoix was ordained as a priest in 1713. In 1715, he published his first complete work, on the establishment and progress of the Catholic Church in Japan, adding extensive notes on the manners, customs, and costumes of the inhabitants of the Empire and its general political situation, and on the topography and natural history of the region.

Charlevoix's work was halted by a royal commission that requested a survey of the historic boundaries of Acadia, a French colony ceded to the British Empire in the 1713 Peace of Utrecht. He sailed from La Rochelle in June 1720 and reached Quebec by the end of September. His knowledge of North America led to an extension of his assignment, under instructions to find a route to the "Western Sea" (i.e., the Pacific Ocean) but "still give the impression of being no more than a traveler or missionary." Having recently lost control of the Hudson Bay and lacking funds for a major expedition, the French Crown equipped Charlevoix with two canoes, eight experienced companions, and basic trading merchandise. From Quebec, he set out for the colony of Saint-Domingue via the Saint Lawrence River and the Great Lakes to Michilimackinac, where he made an excursion to the southern edge of Green Bay. He traveled along the eastern shore of Lake Michigan, trying to reach the Illinois River from the Chicago, but the shallowness of the water forced him up the St. Joseph to the headwaters of the Theakiki, whose waters fall into the Illinois River. He traveled along the Illinois until he reached the Mississippi River in 1721, which he considered "the finest confluence in the world". Visiting the Illinois Country along the way, Charlevoix traveled down the Mississippi to its mouth at the Gulf Coast. He embarked on a ship at New Orleans for the sail to the island of Saint-Domingue in the Caribbean, but it was wrecked at the entrance of the Bahama Channel. He was aided by nuns of the order of the Ursulines of Quebec, whose founder St Marie of the Incarnation later was the subject of one of his books. Charlevoix and his companions returned to the Mississippi River via following the coast of Florida.

Charlevoix's second trip to Saint-Domingue was more fortunate. He arrived in the colony at the beginning of September 1722. He departed for France at the end of that month, landing at Le Havre on 24 December. Charlevoix kept a record of his entire expedition, which he published as the Journal d'un voyage fait par l'ordre du Roi dans l'Amérique Septentrionale de la Nouvelle France Charlevoix's records of local geography were later used to improve regional maps. Unsuccessful in reaching the Pacific, he reported upon his return to France in 1722 of two possible routes: by the Missouri River, "whose source is certainly not far from the sea", or by the establishment of a mission in Sioux territory, from which contact with tribes further west may have been possible.

In 1723, Charlevoix traveled to Italy.

For twenty-two years, from 1733 to 1755, Charlevoix was one of the directors of the Mémoires or Journal de Trévoux, a monthly journal of literature, history, and science. On the pages of that journal, he lay down in 1735 the plan for a corpus of histories that should have given an all-inclusive account of the extra-European world. The plan was announced when his history of Japan—the first installment of the proposed series—was about to be published. In 1744 he published his History of New France, drawing on various authors as well as his own observations, thus providing the most comprehensive book on the history and geography of the French colony.

His death, at La Flèche on 1 February 1761, prevented him from developing his history of New France beyond 1736.

== Legacy ==
Many places are named after him, listed here.

The region of Charlevoix north of Quebec City is one, as are Charlevoix County and its county seat Charlevoix, Michigan in the state of Michigan. The Montreal Metro has a station named after him.

Louise Phelps Kellogg wrote "Charlevoix was not of the temper of the earlier Jesuits of New France. He was by no means a zealot, and had no vocation to deliver himself to a life of suffering and deprivation for the conversion of Indian souls. Rather, he was a man of scholarly temper, interested as an observer in world affairs. […] His was an eager curiosity concerning life, rather than a burning ambition to be himself a moulder of destiny."

== Works ==
Charlevoix's works, enumerated in the Bibliographie des Pères de la Compagnie de Jésus (Bibliography of Jesuit Priests) by Carlos Sommervogel, fall into two groups. Several of his works have maps by the French philosophe (Enlightenment intellectual) and engineer Jacques-Nicolas Bellin, which represent the most accurate material of the time. His History and General Description of New France was of capital importance for Canadian history. His History and General Description of Japan was an expansion on the prior work of Engelbert Kaempfer.

- Histoire de l'Établissement, des Progrès, et de la Décadence du Christianisme dans l'Empire du Japon, ou l'On Voit les Différentes Révolutions qui Ont Agité Cette Monarchie Pendant plus d'un Siècle (in French), Rouen, 1715, reprinted 1829.
  Volume I
  Volume II
  Volume III
- La Vie de la Mère Marie de l'Incarnation, Institutrice & Primière Supérieure des Ursulines de la Nouvelle France, Paris: Ant. Claude Briasson, 1724. (in French)
- Histoire de l'Isle Espagnole ou de S. Domingue, Ecrite Particulierement sur de Mémoires Manuscrits de P. Jean-Baptiste le Pers, Jesuite, Missionaire à Saint Domingue, & sur les Pièces Originales, qui se Conservent au Dépôt de la Marine, Vol. I, Paris: François Barois, 1730. (in French)
- Histoire de l'Isle Espagnole..., Vol. II, Paris: François Barois, 1731. (in French)
- Histoire de l'Isle Espagnole..., Vol. III, Amsterdam: François l'Honoré, 1733. (in French)
- Histoire et Description Générale du Japon: ou l'On Trouvera Tout Ce qu'On a Pu Apprendre de la Nature & des Productions du Pays, du Caractère & des Coutumes des Habitans, du Gouvernement & du Commerce, des Révolutions Arrivées dans l'Empire & dans la Religion, et l'Examen de Tous les Auteurs, qui Ont Écrit sur le Même Sujet, avec les Fastes Chronologiques de la Découverte du Nouveau Monde (in French), Paris: Julien-Michel Gandouin & al., 1736
  Volume I
  Volume II
- Histoire et Description Générale de la Nouvelle France, avec le Journal Historique d'un Voyage Fait par Ordre du Roi dans l'Amérique Septentrionnale (in French), Paris: Veuve Ganeau & al., 1744
  Volume I
  Volume II
  Volume III
  - An Account of the French Settlements in North America: Shewing from the Latest Authors, the Towns, Ports, Islands, Lakes, Rivers, &c. of Canada, Claimed and Improved by the French King, Boston: Rogers & Fowle, 1746.
  - A Voyage to North-America: Undertaken by Command of the Present King of France, Containing the Geographical Description and Natural History of Canada and Louisiana, with the Customs, Manners, Trade, and Religion of the Inhabitants, a Description of the Lakes and Rivers, with their Navigation and Manner of Passing the Great Cataracts, Dublin: John Exshaw & James Potts, 1766
    Volume I
    Volume II
  - Shea, John Gilmary, ed. (1866), History and General Description of New France, Chicago: Loyola University Press
    Volume I
    Volume II
    Volume III
  - Shea, John Gilmary, ed. (1870), History and General Description of New France, vol. IV, Chicago: Loyola University Press.
  - Shea, John Gilmary, ed. (1871), History and General Description of New France, vol. V, Chicago: Loyola University Press.
  - Shea, John Gilmary, ed. (1872), History and General Description of New France, vol. VI, Chicago: Loyola University Press.
- Histoire du Paraguay (in French), Paris: Ganeau & al., 1756
  Volume I
  Volume II
  Volume III
  Volume IV
  - The History of Paraguay, Containing amongst Many Other New, Curious, and Interesting Particulars of That Country, a Full and Authentic Account of the Establishments Formed There by the Jesuits, from among the Savage Natives, in the Very Centre of Barbarism, Establishments Allowed to Have Realized the Sublime Ideas of Fenelon, Sir Thomas More, and Plato, Dublin: P. & W. Wilson & al., 1769
  Volume I
  Volume II
  - Historia Paraguajensis (in Latin), Venice: Francisco Sansoni, 1779

See also Charlevoix's work in Lénardon's index to the Journal du Trévoir.

== See also ==
- Other Charlevoixes

== Sources ==
- Spillane, Edward Peter (1913). "François-Xavier Charlevoix" . In Herbermann, Charles (ed.). Catholic Encyclopedia. Vol. III. New York: Robert Appleton Company.
- Baynes, T. S., ed. (1878). "Pierre François Xavier de Charlevoix" . Encyclopædia Britannica. Vol. V (9th ed.). New York: Charles Scribner's Sons. p. 429.
- Chisholm, Hugh, ed. (1911). "Charlevoix, Pierre François Xavier de" . Encyclopædia Britannica. Vol. 5 (11th ed.). Cambridge University Press. p. 946.
