= Robert Boss =

American football player and coach (born 1983)

No. 94
- Positions: Fullback, linebacker

Personal information
- Born: October 19, 1983 (age 43); Charlevoix, Michigan
- Listed height: 6 ft 5 in (1.96 m)
- Listed weight: 296 lb (134 kg)

Career information
- High school: Charlevoix (MI)
- College: Northern Michigan
- NFL draft: 2005: undrafted

Career history

Playing
- Green Bay Blizzard (2006); Chicago Rush (2007–2008); Chicago Slaughter (2009); Chicago Rush (2010)

Coaching
- St. Norbert; Linebackers coach (2007–2008); Northern Michigan; Defensive line coach (2009); Northern Michigan; Offensive line coach (2010–2016); Northern Michigan; Co-interim head coach (2016); Finlandia; Offensive coordinator (2017); Finlandia; Head coach (2018)

Awards and highlights
- CIFL Champion (2009)

Career AFL statistics
- Carries: 42
- Rushing yards–TDs: 119–10
- Receptions: 32
- Receiving yards–TDs: 363–10
- Tackles: 10
- Stats at ArenaFan.com

Robert L. Boss (born October 19, 1983) is an American former football coach and player. In 2006, he played for the af2's Green Bay Blizzard. Boss graduated from Northern Michigan University.

== High school years ==
Boss attended Charlevoix High School in Charlevoix, Michigan, and was a letterman in football, basketball, baseball, and track&field. In football, as a senior, he won All-Conference honors and was named the Team MVP. In basketball, he led his team to the Class C semifinals as a junior, and won All-Conference honors as a senior. In baseball, he grabbed All-Conference honors as a senior.

== 2006 stats ==
As of August 27, 2006 (Includes playoffs)

Offense

| Rushing | N/A |
| Passing | N/A |
| Receiving | 6 receptions, 58 yards |
| Scoring | 1 Touchdown, 1 2-point conversion |

Defense

| Tackles | 19 solo, 9 assisted |
| Sacks | 4.5 |
| Interceptions | 1 |
| Fumbles Forced | 1 |
| Fumbles Recovered | 1 |
| Blocked Kicks | 1 |
| Scoring | N/A |
