= Fisherman's Island State Park =

Park in Michigan, USA

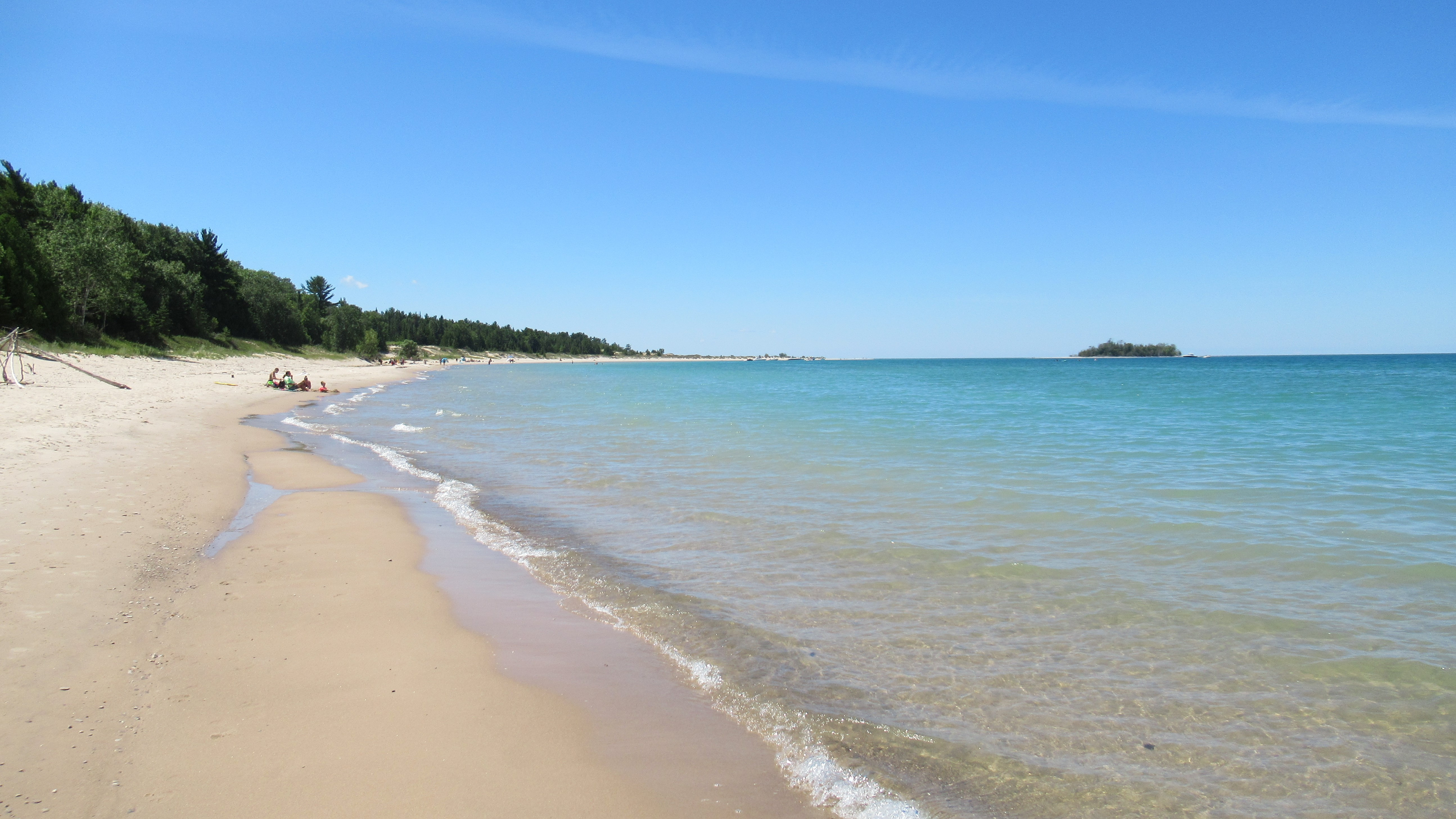
- Looking toward Fisherman's Island

- Location within Michigan Location within the United States
- Location: Charlevoix and Norwood townships, Charlevoix County, Michigan, United States
- Nearest city: Charlevoix, Michigan
- Coordinates: 45°17′14″N 85°21′33″W
- Area: 2,678 acres (1,084 ha)
- Elevation: 587 feet (179 m)
- Established: 1975
- Administrator: Michigan Department of Natural Resources
- Designation: Michigan state park
- Website: Official website

Fisherman's Island State Park is a public recreation area of 2,678 acres (1,084 ha) sitting on six miles (9.7 km) of Lake Michigan shoreline southwest of Charlevoix, Michigan. It is named for a small piece of land, Fisherman Island, located some 900 feet (270 m) from the mainland. For most of the period from 1998 to 2016, historically low lake levels resulted in the island becoming attached to the mainland via a tombolo. The park's interior terrain consists largely of rolling dunes covered with maple, birch and aspen broken up by bogs of cedar and black spruce. The park is operated by the Michigan Department of Natural Resources.

== Activities and amenities ==
The park features rustic campgrounds with some sites nestled in the dunes along the lake shore. The park offers picnicking, swimming beaches, over three miles of hiking trails, hunting, and snowmobiling.
