= Fisherman Island (Michigan) =

Island in Michigan, United States

- Location within Michigan Location within the United States

Geography
- Location: Lake Michigan
- Coordinates: 45.2872270°N 85.3592415°W
- Highest elevation: 587 ft (178.9 m)

Administration
- United States
- State: Michigan
- County: Charlevoix County
- Township: Norwood Township

Fisherman Island is an island in Lake Michigan on the western shore of Charlevoix County, Michigan. The island part of the 2,678-acre Fisherman's Island State Park. The island becomes a peninsula with the mainland, when water levels are low in Lake Michigan.

== Climate ==
Fisherman Island

Climate chart (precipitation, max. and min. temperature)
J	F	M	A	M	J	J	A	S	O	N	D
79 −7 −13	56 −12 −18	56 −2 −11	117 5 −4	101 11 6	80 17 9	88 20 15	66 19 14	124 18 13	156 10 6	112 8 0	69 −2 −4
- █ Average max. and min. temperatures in °C
- █ Precipitation totals in mm
Imperial conversion
J	F	M	A	M	J	J	A	S	O	N	D
3.1 19 9	2.2 10 0	2.2 28 12	4.6 41 25	4 52 43	3.1 63 48	3.5 68 59	2.6 66 57	4.9 64 55	6.1 50 43	4.4 46 32	2.7 28 25
- █ Average max. and min. temperatures in °F
- █ Precipitation totals in inches
