= Charlevoix Township, Michigan =

- Civil township
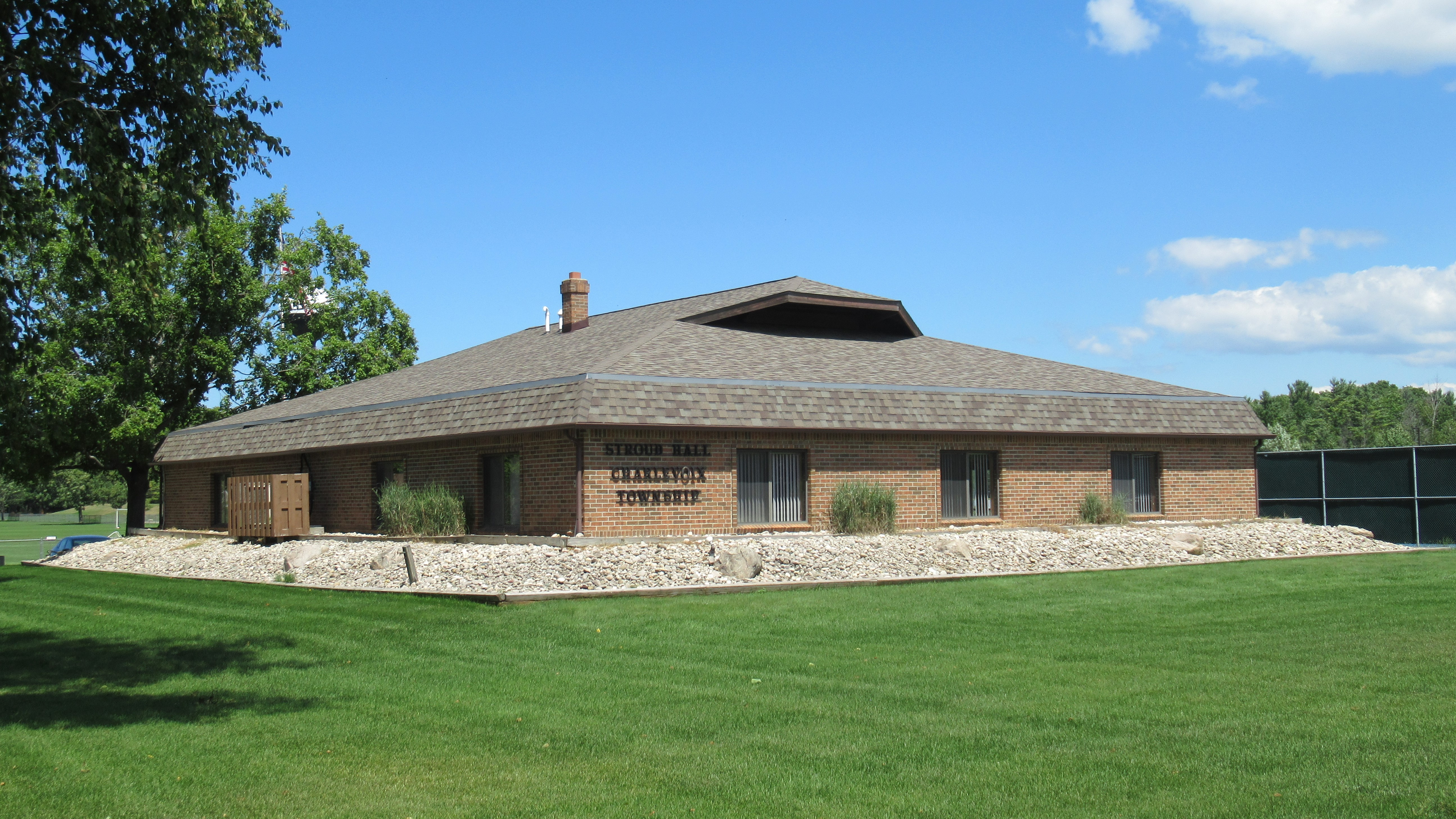
- Charlevoix Township Offices (Stroud Hall)

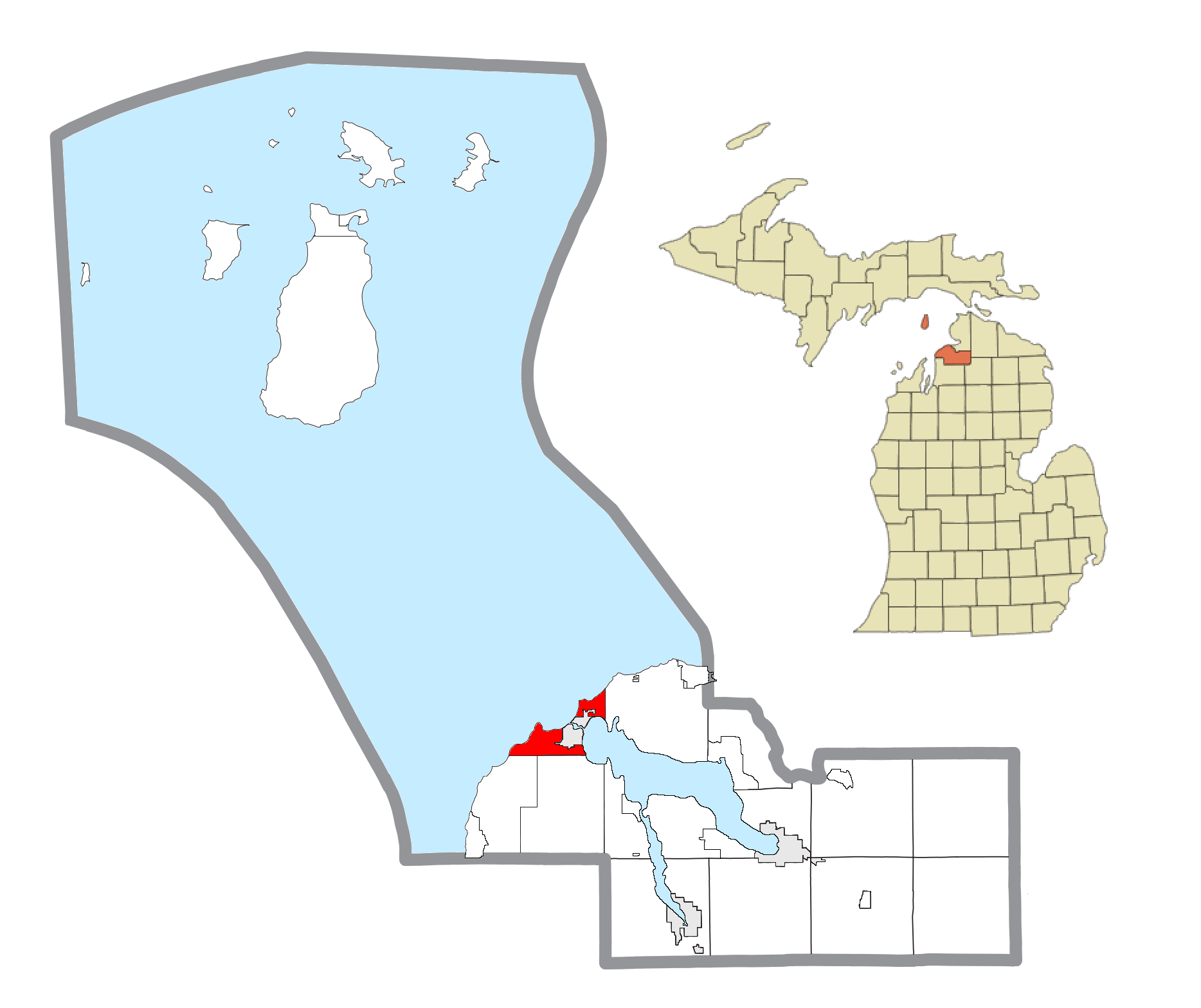
- Location within Charlevoix County

- Location within the state of Michigan Location within the United States
- Coordinates: 45°19′34″N 85°15′02″W
- Country: United States
- State: Michigan
- County: Charlevoix

Area
  - Total: 12.08 sq mi (31.29 km^{2})
  - Land: 5.94 sq mi (15.38 km^{2})
  - Water: 6.14 sq mi (15.90 km^{2})
- Elevation: 617 ft (188 m)

Population (2020)
  - Total: 1,763
  - Density: 296.9/sq mi (114.6/km^{2})
- Time zone: UTC-5 (Eastern (EST))
  - Summer (DST): UTC-4 (EDT)
- ZIP code(s): 49711 (Bay Shore); 49720 (Charlevoix)
- Area code: 231
- FIPS code: 26-14800
- GNIS feature ID: 1626061
- Website: Official website

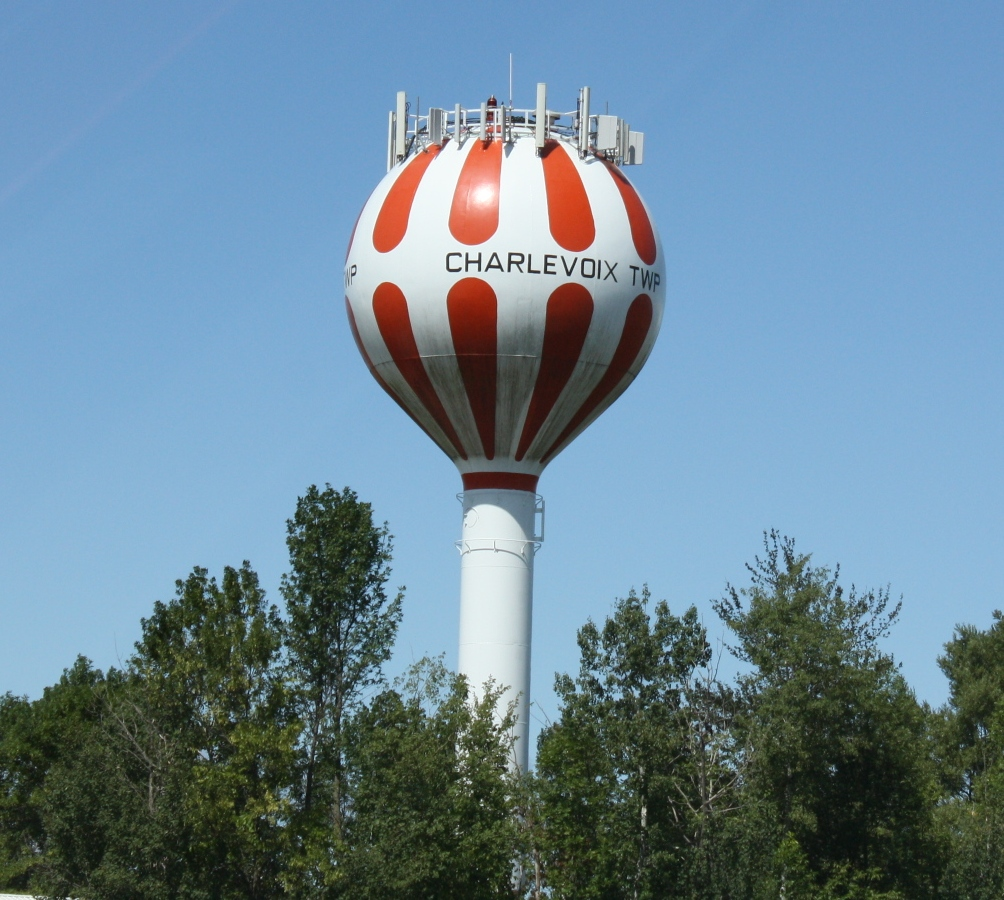
Charlevoix Township water tower

Charlevoix Township is a civil township of Charlevoix County in the U.S. state of Michigan. The population was 1,763 at the 2020 census.

The township surrounds the city of Charlevoix in two segments along Lake Michigan and Lake Charlevoix, but the township and city are administered autonomously.

== Communities ==
- Belvedere is a historic settlement located about 1.0 mile (1.6 km) south of Charlevoix. It was settled in 1893 with a train depot along the Chicago and Western Michigan Railroad. A post office spelled Belvidere opened June 20, 1893 but was respelled to Belvedere three weeks later. The community did not survive long, and the post office closed by December 21 of the same year.
- Boulder Park is an unincorporated community located within the township at 45°18′50″N 85°16′45″W.

== Geography ==
According to the U.S. Census Bureau, the township has a total area of 12.08 square miles (31.29 km^{2}), of which 5.94 square miles (15.38 km^{2}) is land and 6.14 square miles (15.90 km^{2}) (50.83%) is water.

Charlevoix Township is located along the shore of Lake Michigan and Lake Charlevoix, and it occupies two segments of land surrounding the city of Charlevoix. The northern portion of Fisherman's Island State Park is within the township.

=== Major highways ===
- US 31 runs north through both segments of the township and in and out of the city of Charlevoix.
- M-66 enters briefly through the southeast corner of the township and terminates at US 31 in the city of Charlevoix.
- C-56 (Boyne City–Charlevoix Road) is a county-designated highway that begins at US 31 and runs briefly though the northern segment of the township.
- C-65 (Marion Center Road) is a county-designated highway that enters the southern segment of the township only briefly before ending at US 31 in the city of Charlevoix.

== Demographics ==
Historical population
Census	Pop.	Note	%±
2000	1,697		—
2010	1,645		−3.1%
2020	1,763		7.2%

As of the census of 2000, there were 1,697 people, 662 households, and 462 families residing in the township. The population density was 283.3 inhabitants per square mile (109.4/km^{2}). There were 942 housing units at an average density of 157.3 per square mile (60.7/km^{2}). The racial makeup of the township was 96.05% White, 0.71% African American, 1.53% Native American, 0.82% Asian, 0.18% Pacific Islander, 0.24% from other races, and 0.47% from two or more races. Hispanic or Latino of any race were 1.18% of the population.

There were 662 households, out of which 32.2% had children under the age of 18 living with them, 58.2% were married couples living together, 8.3% had a female householder with no husband present, and 30.2% were non-families. 25.5% of all households were made up of individuals, and 11.8% had someone living alone who was 65 years of age or older. The average household size was 2.50 and the average family size was 2.98.

In the township the population was spread out, with 25.5% under the age of 18, 6.5% from 18 to 24, 24.2% from 25 to 44, 26.3% from 45 to 64, and 17.5% who were 65 years of age or older. The median age was 41 years. For every 100 females, there were 94.2 males. For every 100 females age 18 and over, there were 89.4 males.

The median income for a household in the township was $45,758, and the median income for a family was $51,250. Males had a median income of $40,263 versus $22,969 for females. The per capita income for the township was $22,835. About 3.3% of families and 4.7% of the population were below the poverty line, including 4.1% of those under age 18 and 5.9% of those age 65 or over.

== Education ==
Charlevoix Township is served entirely by Charlevoix Public Schools in the city of Charlevoix.
