= Charlevoix South Pier Light Station =

Lighthouse in Michigan, United States

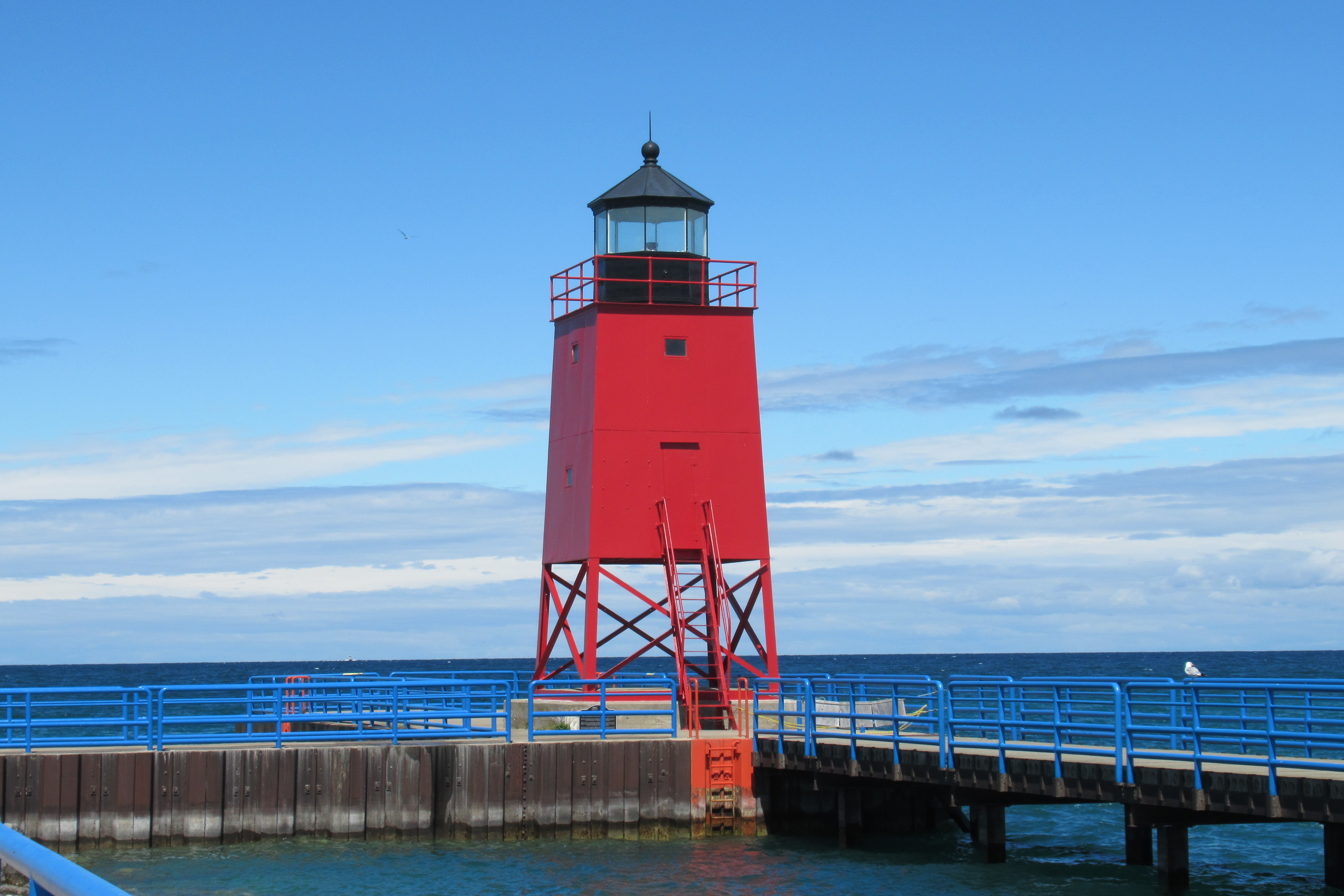
- View of the lighthouse in July 2022
- Location: S pier at harbor entrance, 0.3 WNW of US 31 drawbridge, Charlevoix County, Michigan
- Coordinates: 45°19′13″N 85°15′54″W

Tower
- Constructed: 1948
- Foundation: pier
- Construction: steel skeletal tower, upper 2/3 enclosed
- Height: 44 feet (13 m)
- Shape: Square pyramid tower, decagonal lantern
- Markings: red Daymark/black lantern
- Heritage: National Register of Historic Places listed place

Light
- Focal height: 13 m (43 ft)
- Lens: Fifth order Fresnel Lens (original), 12-inch (300 mm) Tideland Signal ML-300 acrylic lens (current)
- Range: 10 nautical miles (19 km; 12 mi)
- Characteristic: Flashing Red 4s HORN: 1 blast ev 30s (3s bl). Operates from May 1 to Oct. 20.
- Charlevoix South Pierhead Light
- U.S. National Register of Historic Places
- Area: less than 1-acre (4,000 m^{2})
- Built: 1948
- Architect: US Coast Guard, Ninth District
- MPS: Light Stations of the United States MPS
- NRHP reference No.: 05000346
- Added to NRHP: April 28, 2005

The Charlevoix South Pier Light Station is located on Lake Michigan at the entrance to Lake Charlevoix in Charlevoix County in the U.S. state of Michigan at the end of the south pier/breakwater of the channel leading to Round Lake in the city of Charlevoix.

== History ==
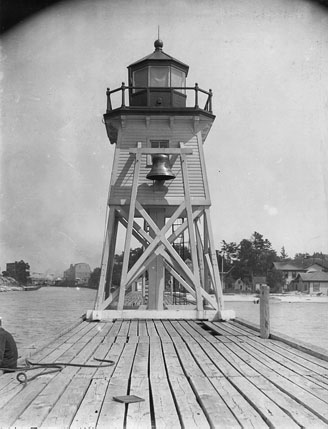
Old Charlevoix Light (note Fog bell), U. S. Coast Guard Archive

The first light in Charlevoix was located on the north pier. It was erected in 1884 in order to guide ships to the newly improved Pine River channel. A lifesaving station was built just north of the lighthouse in 1898 and an oil shed was built in 1890. The first tower was 56 feet (17 m) tall, with a 61 feet (19 m) focal height.

The original structure survived for 63 years, but due to terminal deterioration the decision was made to replace it in 1947. In 1948 the new steel structure was installed and the light was moved to its current location on the south pier where the lens and lantern from the old structure were transferred to the new one. The skeletal structure and general configuration of this light shares some design elements with the Alpena Light. The South Pierhead light was originally painted Daymark red.

In 1965, because the Pine River channel is near a congested area, the Coast Guard vacated the old U.S. Life-Saving Service Station (tearing down the shingled building), and relocated to the grounds of the old Lighthouse Supply Station.

In 1989, the present steel and concrete pier replaced the old wooden pier with its concrete covering. The present piers and revetments were constructed in the 1970s and 1980s. The construction is specially designed to withstand unusually forceful wave pressures, and to protect the harbor. As Terry Pepper wrote:

Constructed of driven steel piles with concrete and rock fill, wooden buffers were added where needed. These new piers were designed to incorporate hydrodynamic features to protect the harbor area. The rectangular gaps beyond the beach are intended to absorb and break-up inbound wave force, thereby reducing the swells that would travel from the big lake all the way up the channel into Round Lake. The Pine River Channel is believed to be unique in the entire world inasmuch as it has a two-way current. After severe westerly windstorms, waters pushed high into Lake Charlevoix will swiftly flow back out to meet other inbound currents. Small whirlpools and eddies at the harbor mouth are not uncommon, and whitecaps can frequently be observed within the channel on the calmest days.

— Terry Pepper

The skeletal north pierhead tower has since been removed.

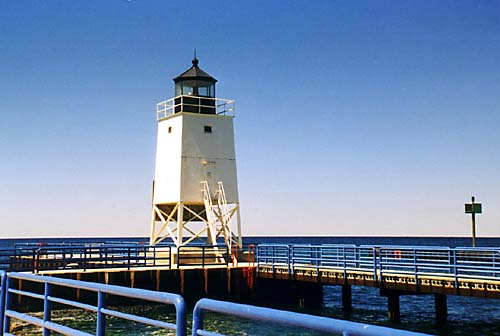
The lighthouse as it appeared in 1999

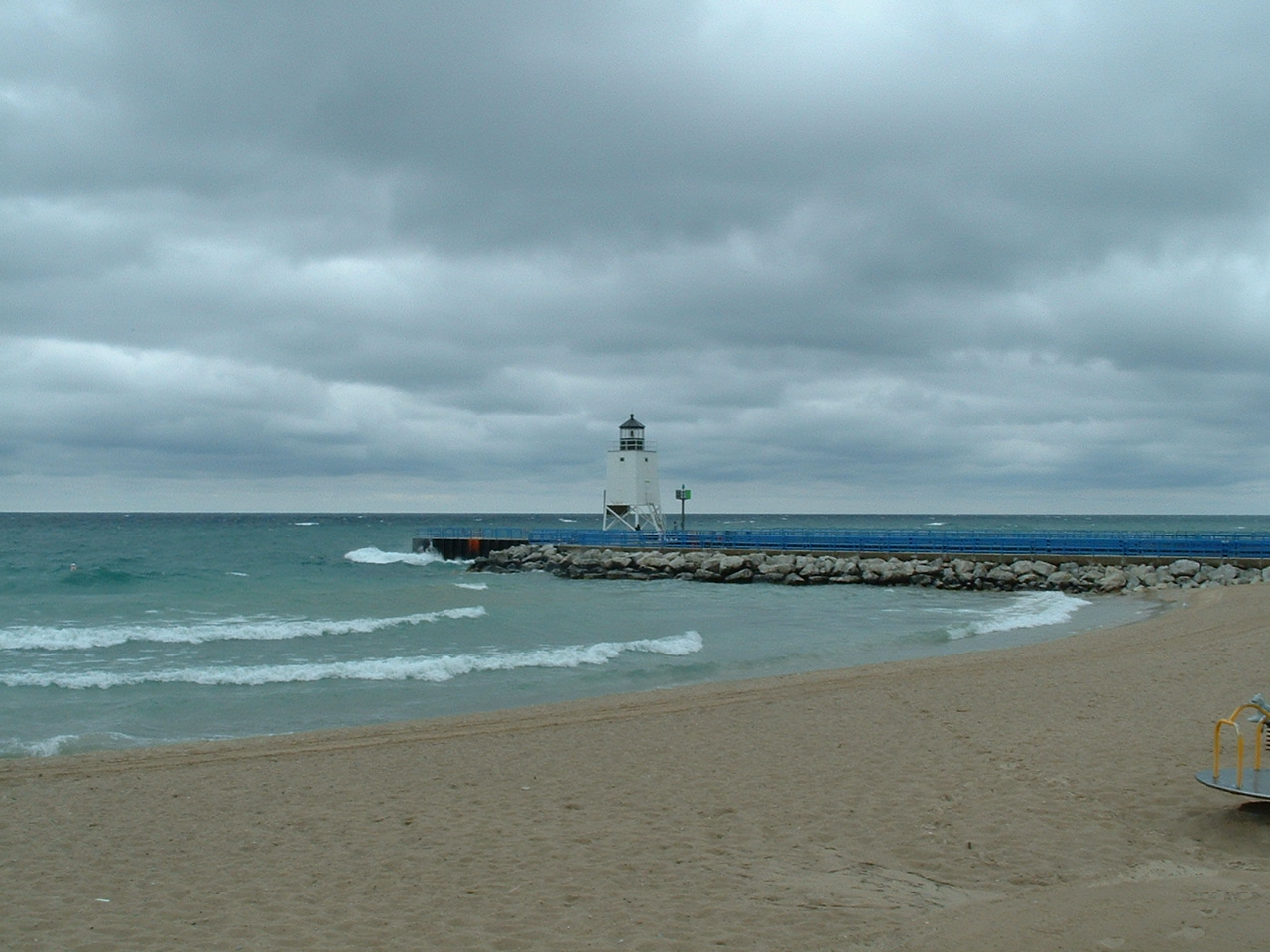
Charlevoix Lights, north and south piers in 2005

The 12-inch (300 mm) Tideland Signal ML-300 acrylic lens is described as a medium-range modern Great Lakes lens with a maximum range of 10 nautical miles (19 km; 12 mi).

The North Pierhead Light is at coordinates 45 19 18 N 85 15 54 W, and its characteristic is Flashing Green 2.5 seconds. The current tower is 20 feet (6.1 m) and it is an active aid to navigation. The former North tower's height is 56 feet, with a focal plane of 61 feet.

Described as the Charlevoix South Pierhead Light (added 2005 - Structure - #05000346) and also known as the Charlevoix Pier Light, it is listed in the National Register of Historic Places. Specifically, it is described as "S pier at harbor entrance, 0.3 WNW of US 31 drawbridge, Charlevoix". Although it was unmanned, the National Park System has recognized it as a "significant aid to navigation."

In 2009 the light was again painted red in keeping with the mariner's alliterative Mnemonic "Red Right returning." For unknown reasons, previous Daymark color schemes have been green, white. or originally red (until 1968). See Sea mark.

A primary vessel benefiting from the Charlevoix Light is the Beaver Island ferry.

The land based lighthouse keeper's residence was sold to a private owner and demolished. The property became Hoffman Park, and all that remains is a metal plaque.

In 2008, ownership of the light was transferred from the U.S. Coast Guard to the City of Charlevoix/Charlevoix Historical Society. The transfer was completed under the National Historic Lighthouse Preservation Act.

== See also ==
- Lighthouses in the United States
