= Charlevoix, Michigan =

- City
- City of Charlevoix
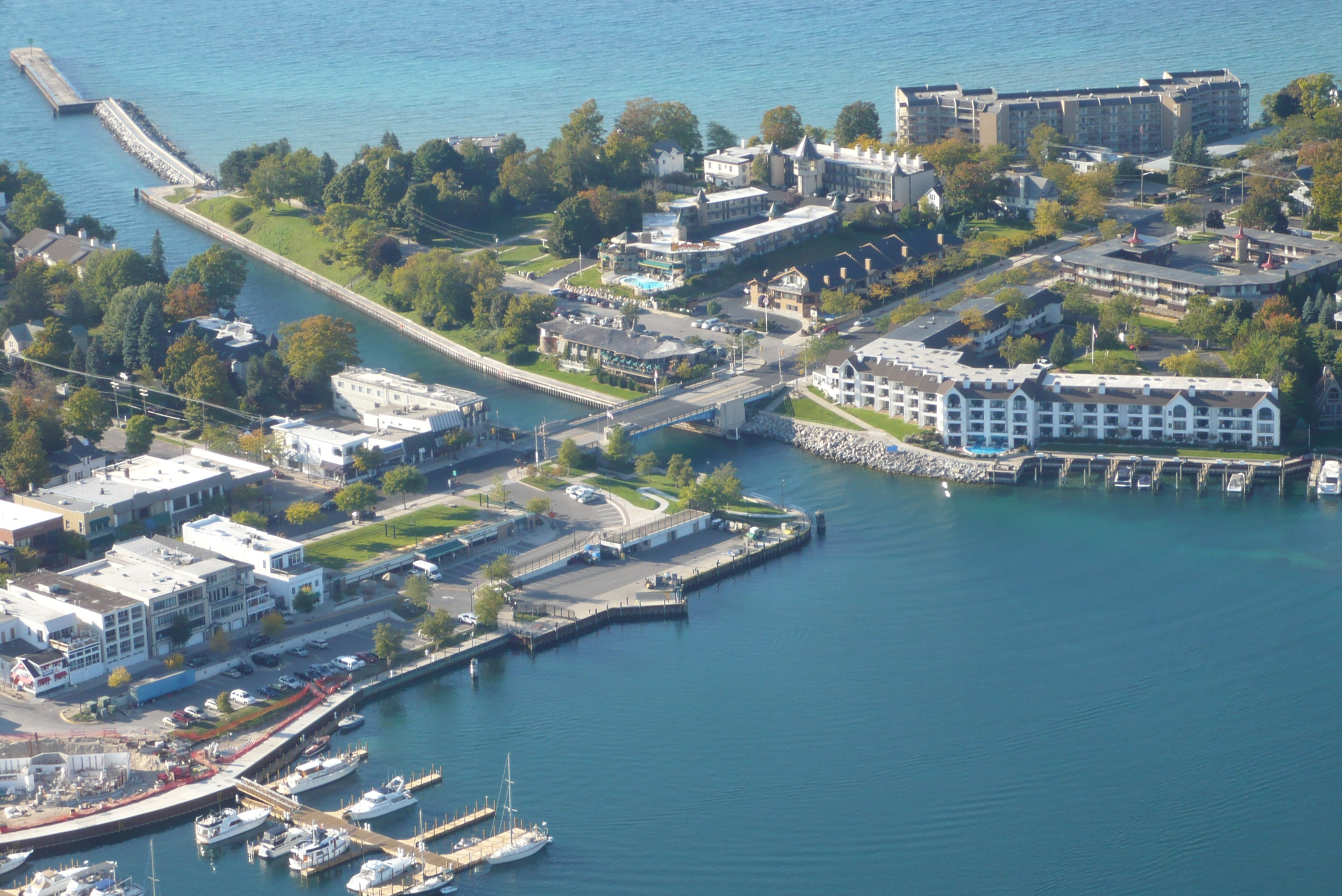
- Aerial view of the downtown area with the US 31–Island Lake Outlet Bridge in the center

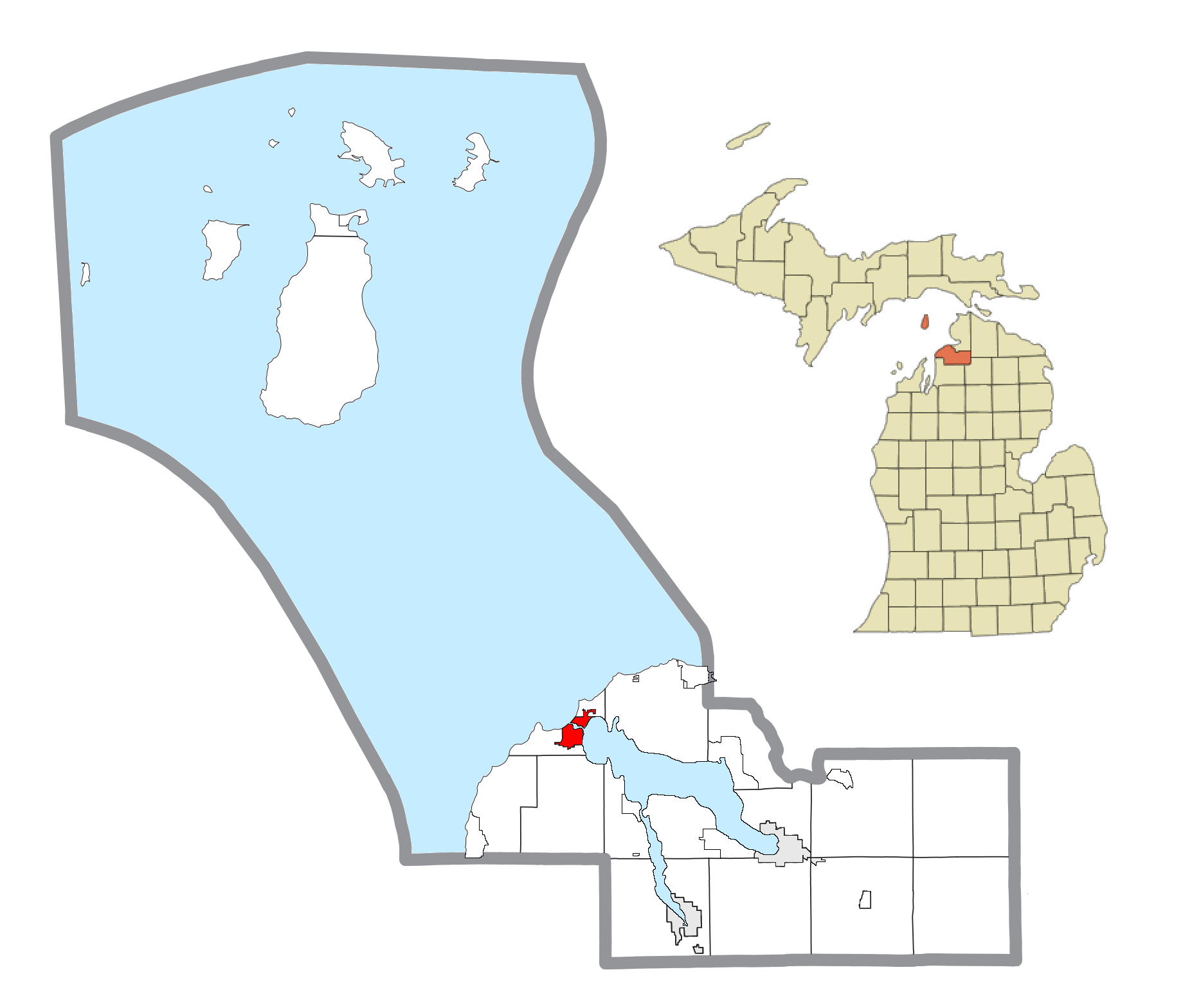
- Location within Charlevoix County

- Location within the state of Michigan Location within the United States
- Coordinates: 45°19′05″N 85°15′30″W
- Country: United States
- State: Michigan
- County: Charlevoix
- Settled: 1852
- Incorporated: 1879 (village); 1905 (city)

Government
  - Type: Mayor–council
  - Mayor: Lyle Gennett
  - Manager: Mark Heydlauff
  - Clerk: Sarah Dvoracek

Area
  - Total: 2.05 sq mi (5.30 km^{2})
  - Land: 2.05 sq mi (5.30 km^{2})
  - Water: 0 sq mi (0.00 km^{2})
- Elevation: 594 ft (181 m)

Population (2020)
  - Total: 2,348
  - Density: 1,146.7/sq mi (442.74/km^{2})
- Time zone: UTC-5 (EST)
  - Summer (DST): UTC-4 (EDT)
- ZIP code(s): 49720
- Area code: 231
- FIPS code: 26-14780
- GNIS feature ID: 0623115
- Website: www.charlevoixmi.gov

Charlevoix (/ˈʃɑːrləvɔɪ/ SHAR-lə-voy) is a city in the U.S. state of Michigan. It is the county seat of Charlevoix County. Part of Northern Michigan, Charlevoix is located on an isthmus between Lake Michigan and Lake Charlevoix, bisected by the short Pine River. Charlevoix serves as the main access point for Beaver Island, the largest island in Lake Michigan, which can be accessed by Island Airways or carferry. The population of Charlevoix was 2,348 at the 2020 census. Charlevoix is mostly surrounded by Charlevoix Township, but the two are administered autonomously.

== History ==
Charlevoix is named after Fr. Pierre François Xavier de Charlevoix, a French explorer who traveled the Great Lakes and was said to have stayed the night on Fisherman's Island during a harsh storm. During this time, Native Americans were thought to have lived in the Pine River valley. The Odawa and Ojibwe lived throughout northern Michigan prior to European colonization.

=== Settlement (1850s and 1860s) ===
European-American settlement of Charlevoix was initially by fishermen, who were there by 1852. Soon after its formation in the 1850s, the residents of Charlevoix entered into a short-lived conflict with James Strang, leader and namesake of the Strangite Mormons, and then self-proclaimed 'king' of Beaver Island. Relations between Charlevoix residents and the Strangites were often tense. In 1853, a gunfight broke out between the two groups as the townspeople refused to hand over a man who was called for jury duty on the island, an event known locally as The Battle of Pine River. Strang was assassinated on June 20, 1856.

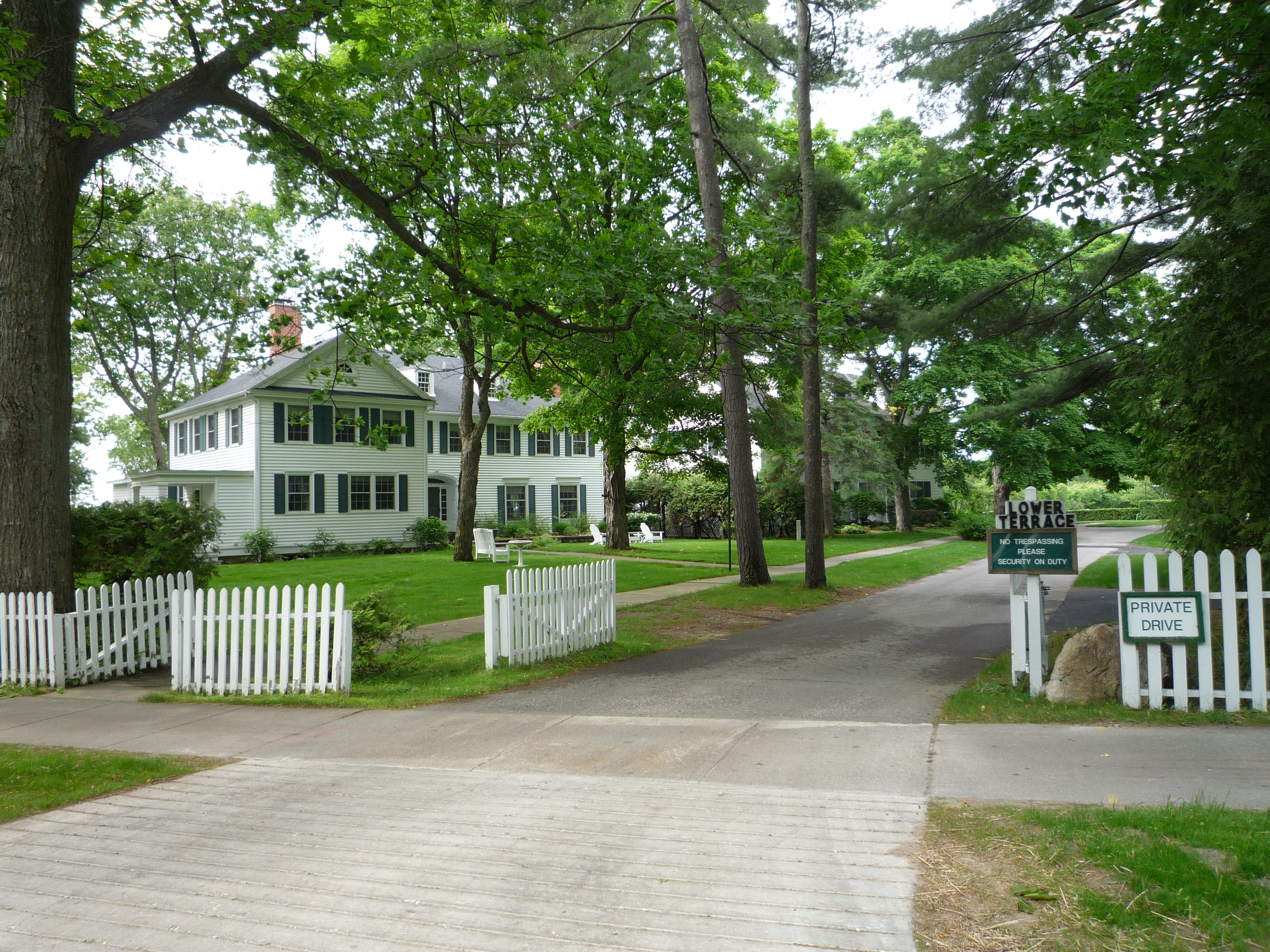
Portion of the historic Chicago Club, one of the several large resort communities that developed in Charlevoix around the turn of the 20th century.

The Homestead Act of 1862 brought many Civil War veterans and speculators to Northern Michigan. It sold 160-acre tracts of land for $1.25 an acre.

In 1864, settlers built a large dock at the mouth of the Pine River on Lake Michigan. Boats there were exposed to the harsh vicissitudes of Great Lakes weather, so local entrepreneurs sought to connect Lake Michigan to an inland harbor at Round Lake. The Pine River channel was dredged in 1869, connecting Lake Michigan to Lake Charlevoix.

In 1866, early settler John S. Dixon completed plats of the entire town (then called "Pine River"), showing that he owned most of the land. By 1867, Charlevoix had its first boarding house, the Fountain City House Charlevoix became the county seat in 1869 when Charlevoix County was formed.

=== Commercial and cultural transformation (1869–1880s) ===
In 1869, the Charlevoix Sentinel was founded, which became a major newspaper of record for the area for the next 60 years.

Prior to 1869, Lake Charlevoix (then known as Pine Lake) was two feet higher than Round Lake, which was 2 feet higher than Lake Michigan. In order to aid lumber and boat traffic, city leaders pooled resources to cut a channel between Lake Charlevoix to Round Lake, and to dredge the Pine River for navigation between Round Lake and Lake Michigan. When this was completed in 1869, lake levels dropped, and navigation between Lake Charlevoix and Lake Michigan was established. This had profound commercial implications for the area.

Another transformative event came in November 1873 when rail operations arrived in "Bear Creek" (now known as Petoskey), 16 miles north. Passengers and goods passed through Petoskey and made their way to Charlevoix via boat or stagecoach. During the 1870s, Presbyterian evangelist Rev. George W. Wood Jr. sold bibles to homesteading settlers throughout Charlevoix and Emmet Counties.

Between 1868 and 1884, the Army Corps of Engineers used dredging and revetment to increase Pine River channel width from 75 feet to over 100 feet, and expanded the channel depth from under 6 feet to a depth of 12 feet. In 1876, Charlevoix was declared a port of entry and became one of the busiest ports on the Great Lakes. Lumber mills proliferated as the forests along Lake Charlevoix could finally be harvested.

In 1876, John Nichols consolidated Charlevoix lumber operations into the Charlevoix Lumber Company, and it became a Charlevoix institution for decades. At its height in the late 1800s, the company annually shipped out more than 40 million board feet of lumber before it stripped much of the peninsula. For many years Charlevoix was a fueling stop for the wood-powered steamships on Lake Michigan. Charlevoix incorporated as a village in 1879.

In June 1883, Charles J. Strang, the son of Mormon King James J. Strang started the Charlevoix Journal, which would be renamed the Charlevoix Courier in 1894. Dr. Levi Lewis and his wife Edith built the 800-seat "Lewis Grand Opera House" along the Pine River in 1883 in order to bring more culture to the backwater pioneer town.

In October 1884, East Jordan to be the county seat, followed by Boyne City becoming the county seat in 1886. Charlevoix became the county seat again in 1894. The Argo Milling Company was built in 1886 along the Pine River. By 1914, many small businesses were established along Bridge Street.

=== Early resort era (1880s–1918) ===
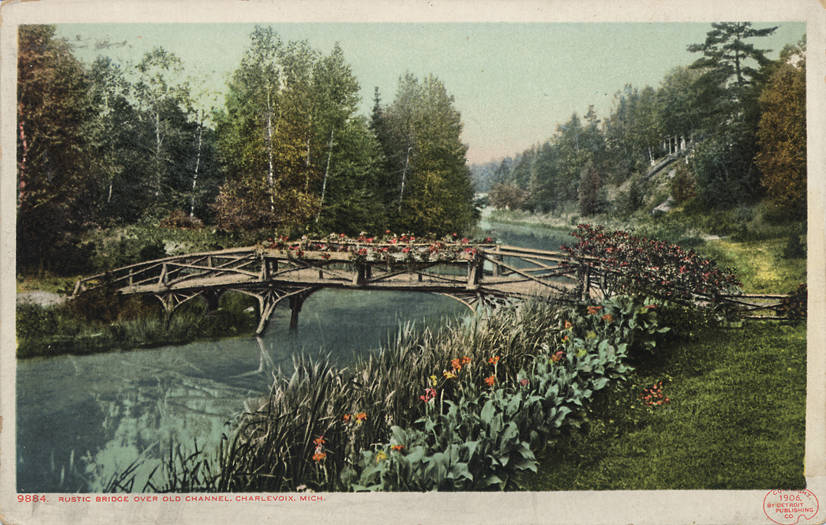
Rustic Bridge over Old Channel in Charlevoix, circa 1900s

In 1880, several members of the First Congregational Church of Chicago formed a Chicago Summer Resort association, now known as the "Chicago Club." Early citizens contributed to the founding of such early institutions as the Lewis Grand Opera House (1883) and Methodist (1878) and Congregational (1885) churches.

In 1892, the first rail traffic to Charlevoix arrived as the Chicago and West Michigan Railway extended rail service from Traverse City to Bay View. (This is not related to the 1901 Detroit and Charlevoix Railroad line to East Jordan). Rail lines opened up formerly remote tracts of inland land and lakeshore to commercial, industrial, resort, and other real estate development, as follows:

- The Detroit-based D.M. Ferry Seed Company expanded operations in northern Michigan, developing the land along Lake Charlevoix in 1892. It built a 200' dock and warehouse complex by 1905. Ferry's Charlevoix operations continued until 1927.
- In 1899, the Federal Revenue Cutter Service came to Charlevoix and began tending buoys on the north side of the Round lake train bridge. This site would later become known as the Coast Guard moorings.
- By 1901, industrialist James M. Felts of Rushville, Indiana had purchased thousands of acres between Mount McSauba and Big Rock point and began construction of a massive sugar beet factory to be called the Charlevoix Sugar Company. The National Construction Company of Detroit built the factory between 1902 and 1903 at the point where Stover Creek emptied into Pine Lake. The factory was not profitable, and by 1911 the factory had closed and the machinery was removed to Ohio. The building, made almost entirely of concrete, slowly decayed until it was demolished in 1964 to make room for the Irish boat shop.
- In 1909, Chicago real estate developer and Chicago Club of Charlevoix member Edward Carson Waller purchased 2000-acres north of the Pere Marquette rail line including the former Felts tract. He replanted the land with pine trees, and commissioned architect Frank Lloyd Wright to create a bathing pavilion on the site. The pavilion burned down in 1922 or 1923.
- The rail also brought tourist traffic during the summer. It was not long before the city became known as a resort destination. With three summer associations (the Belvedere Club, Sequanota Club, and the Chicago Club); a number of luxurious summer hotels, including The Inn and The Beach; and rail service at two train depots on the Pere Marquette Railway line (one depot for the Belvedere Club on the south side of Round Lake and one on the north side near the Chicago Club); Charlevoix became known as one of the nation's finest summer communities.
- In 1913, the Pine Point development (near Oyster Bay) opened on Pine Lake, making it one of the earliest neighborhood subdivisions in the Charlevoix area.

Charlevoix was also a popular destination for many lake passenger liners, including the Manitou, Alabama, North American, South American, Milwaukee Clipper, Illinois, and others. By 1907, the Gazetteer published by R.L. Polk & Co. listed Charlevoix as a port of call for several Michigan steamboat lines including:

- the Anchor Line (Erie and Western Transportation Company from Buffalo, Erie, Cleveland, and Detroit to the summer resorts, Mackinac Island, Sault Ste. Marie, Marquette, Houghton and Hancock, Duluth, St. Paul, Minneapolis etc. connecting at Mackinaw Island with steamer lines to and from Milwaukee and Chicago, Petoskey, Charlevoix, Frankfort, Bay View, and Green Bay Ports.)
- Boyne City and Charlevoix Line (daily)
- East Jordan and Charlevoix Steamboat Line
- Manitou Steamship Company (Between Chicago, Frankfort, Charlevoix, Petoskey, Roaring Brook, Wequetonsing, Harbor Springs, Bay View, and Mackinaw)
- Northern Michigan Transportation Company (every Wednesday and Saturday between Chicago and Ludington, Manistee, Frankfort, Glen Haven, Glen Arbor, Northport, Suttons Bay, Traverse City, Old Mission, Charlevoix, Petoskey, Harbor Springs, Bay View, St. James, St. Ignace, Mackinac Island, and Cheboygan)
- Traverse Bay Transportation Company (daily between Traverse City, Northport, Charlevoix, and intermediate points)

=== Interwar era (1919–1945) ===
Northern Michigan continued to be a resort destination after World War I.

Beginning in 1918 real estate agent, regional promoter, and self-taught architect Earl Young began to design and build his signature "mushroom houses" and other buildings out of locally harvested boulders.

In 1925, members of the Charlevoix Summer Resort Association decided their existing social club needed a golf course. The members called on Scotsman William Watson, who was working across town as head pro of the Chicago Club. Watson's resume included working on such layouts like Interlachen Country Club in Minneapolis, Harding Park Golf Club, and the Olympic Club in San Francisco. At Belvedere he used five teams of horses and 150 men to build 18 holes through a pair of valleys dissected by Marion Center Rd. just south of town. Opened in 1927, the course soon became a respected tournament venue.

In 1918, Albert Loeb, an executive from the Sears corporation in Chicago, built an experimental farm on the southern outskirts of Charlevoix. Known as Loeb Farms, the farm raised prizewinning cattle sold through the Sears Catalog. In its heyday it was the primary employer in Charlevoix County. Loeb's son became involved in an infamous murder trial (the Leopold and Loeb trial). During the trial, Scopes trial lawyer Clarence Darrow arrived at the Charlevoix train station to visit the Loeb family at Loeb Farms. Albert Loeb died in 1924 and the farm closed in 1927 after a three-year agricultural recession.

In 1926. Pine Lake was renamed Lake Charlevoix.

Between 1927 and 1948, former Michigan football player Lewis Reimann founded Camp Charlevoix as a recreational camp for at-risk boys. first in Ironton, Michigan and then in 1928 at a permanent 170-acre site on the shores of Lake Charlevoix. Reimann operated Camp Charlevoix for more than 20 years. After an expansion in 1937, Reimann sold Camp Charlevoix in 1948. Camp Charlevoix continued operations under Kenneth W. Smith until at least 1960.

During Prohibition, Charlevoix became a popular place for gang members from the Chicago area. The Colonial Club, a restaurant and gambling joint on the city's north side became known as a popular place for the Midwest's most powerful and influential. John Koch, the club's owner, kept automobile license number "2", only second to the governor – a telling sign of his influence. The converted lumber barge Keuka served as a blind pig and speakeasy and sailed nightly between Boyne City and Charlevoix, hosting its guests in relative comfort. A murder aboard the ship and the pressure of US Treasury Department surveillance, however, forced the owner to scuttle the vessel in Lake Charlevoix.

In 1930, the first Charlevoix Venetian Festival started as a candle-lit boat parade. (It has continued to be held annually and grown in length and in the types of entertainment offered.)

In the early 1930s photographer and historian Bob Miles began a 42-year career documenting the city of Charlevoix and surrounding areas.

On March 9, 1935, The Petoskey Kiwanis Club sponsored a charter meeting of the Charlevloix Kiwanis Club. In 1939, the Charlevoix Kiwanis Club created Boy Scout Troop 11. Troop 11 is the second oldest Boy Scout troop in Northern Michigan.

Several bridges had been built to cross the Pine River. A drawbridge was planned to be built in 1940, but due to Pearl Harbor, the completion of the current Charlevoix drawbridge bridge was delayed until 1947.

=== Post WWII era (1945–1980) ===
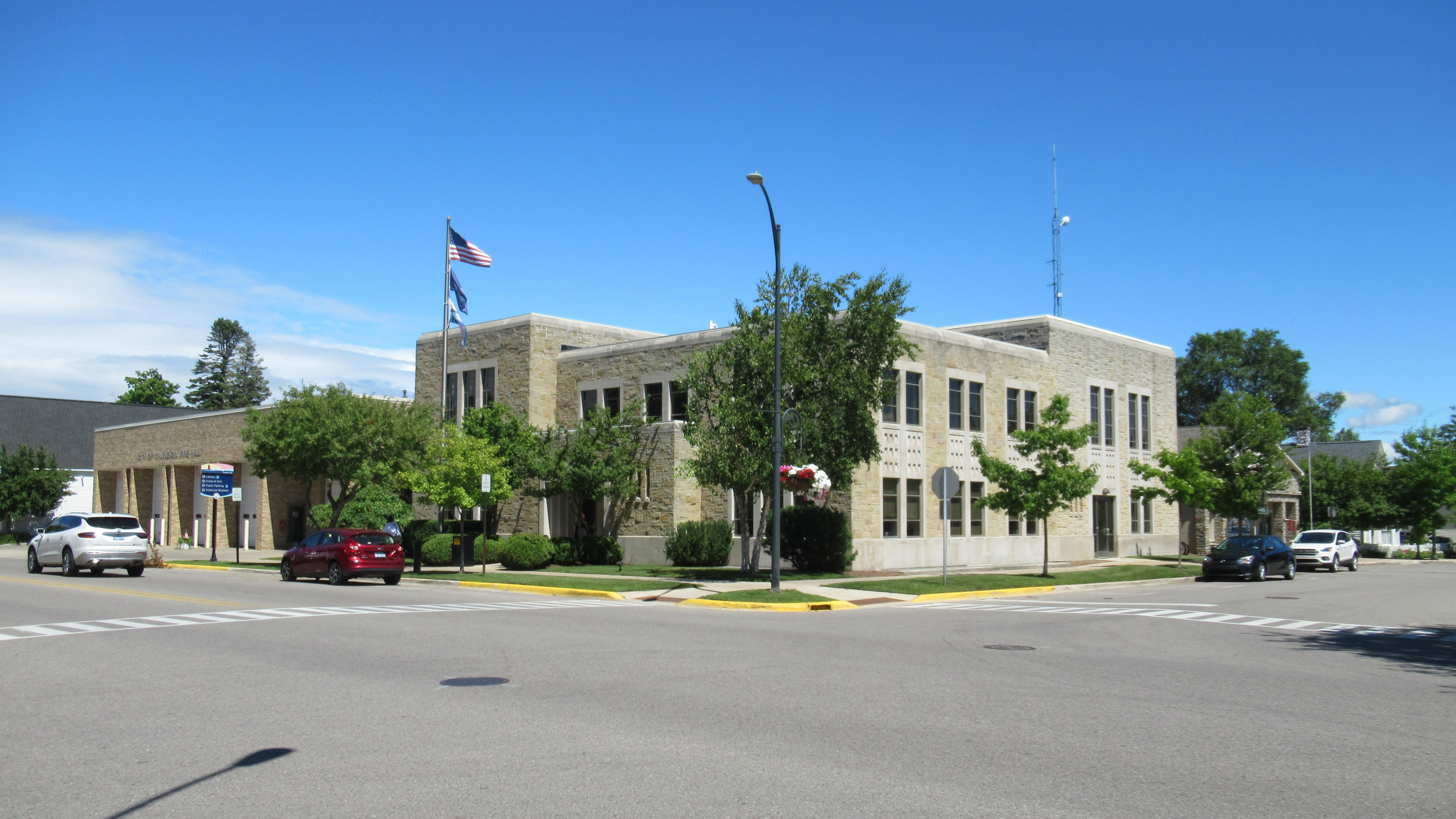
Charlevoix City Hall

Charlevoix suffered economically during the decades after World War II, due to industrial restructuring and changes in fashion, as people used automobiles and airplanes to travel to new tourist destinations. The manufacturing base was displaced with jobs moved elsewhere, the train lines to the city ceased operating, and the larger tourist hotels closed due to competition from other locations. Many empty buildings were left downtown. Several large corporations, such as the nuclear power plant and the cement plant, set up operations in the early 1960s and spurred economic development in the area.

In the 1960s, the lifesaving station was relocated from along the channel to the east part of Round Lake.

November 18, 1958, Charlevoix City Hall served as a makeshift morgue for the bodies of crewmen of the SS Carl D. Bradley after the lake freighter foundered in Lake Michigan during a severe storm. The USCGC Sundew, stationed at Charlevoix, was one of the first vessels to arrive at the search area and played a pivotal role in that night's rescue of the two surviving crewmen.

Charlevoix was home to Michigan's first nuclear power plant, Big Rock Point, which operated from 1962 to 1997.

On January 7, 1971, an unarmed USAF B-52C-45-BO, 54-2666, of the 9th BW, Westover AFB, Massachusetts, crashed into Lake Michigan near Charlevoix during a practice bomb run, exploding on impact. Only a small amount of wreckage, two life vests, and some spilled fuel were found in Little Traverse Bay. The bomber went down six nautical miles from the Bay Shore Air Force Radar Site and close to the Big Rock Point Nuclear Plant. Nine crew members were lost.

In the 1960s, the Medusa corporation decided to build their first greenfield cement plant. they build a cement plant in Charlevoix that came on line in 1967. The plant is located south of town off of US 31 near Fisherman's Island State Park. In the late 1970s, Crane Company took over Medusa and began consolidating operations. This not only resulted in modernization and investment in the Charlevoix plant, but personnel (and their families) from other Crane cement holdings were transferred into the Charlevoix area in the late 1970s and early 1980s. In the late 1990s the cement plant was bought out by Cemex, a transnational company from Mexico. In 2000 Cemex sold the plant to St Marys Cement Group. Until 2013 the cement plant was a frequent port of call for the oldest freighter on the great lakes, SS St. Marys Challenger.

In 1965 the Loeb Farms complex that had been fallow since 1927, was turned into a medieval castle tourist attraction by John Van Haver . This venture quickly folded and was bought by the Reibel family in 1969. For the next ~25 years, the Castle Farms complex hosted large rock concerts. In 1974, Terry and Judy Edger opened WVOY-AM in Charlevoix. WVOY was a 5,000-watt daytime-only station at 1270 kHz on the AM dial. WVOY was one of the first all-contemporary-hit-music radio stations in northern Michigan and featured Bill Vogel ("The Captain," formerly of Detroit's WDRQ), John Yaroch, Rick Durkin, and other major-market-quality talent. Despite WVOY's limited signal, the station became extremely popular and gave northern Michigan listeners a taste of the "big city" radio sound.

=== Recent history (1980–present) ===
In May 1980, former WVOY employee Tim Moore started the WKHQ-FM "The Rhythm of the Northwest" radio station in downtown Charlevoix using TM Programming's "Stereo Rock" format. Despite moving its studios to Petoskey in the 1990s, WKHQ is still licensed as being from Charlevoix. The station was mentioned by Casey Kasem several times on American Top 40 radio program in the 1980s.

The 1980s brought many condominium developments in the area.

In 1991, former farmland near Stover Creek along M-66 was developed into "Charlevoix Commons" shopping center, anchored by a K-mart with the Charlevoix Estates mobile home park across the street. Several new businesses established themselves in this area, and the Post office moved from downtown to this site in 1996.

In 1993 600 acres of the undeveloped Waller tract on the north side of town was transformed into an 18-hole golf course and residential development named the Charlevoix Country Club.

After the 1996 murder of JonBenét Ramsey, whose family spent summers in Charlevoix and had won a pageant in the town, Charlevoix became a regular haven for tabloid photographers, hoping to catch a glimpse of the Ramsey family. John Ramsey, JonBenet's father and husband of the late Patsy Ramsey, still resides in Charlevoix.

In 1997, Charlevoix made national news when it experienced a fireworks disaster during the Venetian Festival. At least one person died and 17 others were injured, while windows were shattered across downtown.

In 2004 and 2005, Wal-Mart tried to build a 157,400-square-foot superstore on the edge of town (Charlevoix Township) near the intersection of US-31 and Marion Center Road across from the Charlevoix airport. Amid community disagreement, some local businesses and residents formed a group called "This Is Our Town" and successfully resisted the entry of Wal-Mart into their community.

For a list of historical landmarks, see Charlevoix County.

== Geography ==
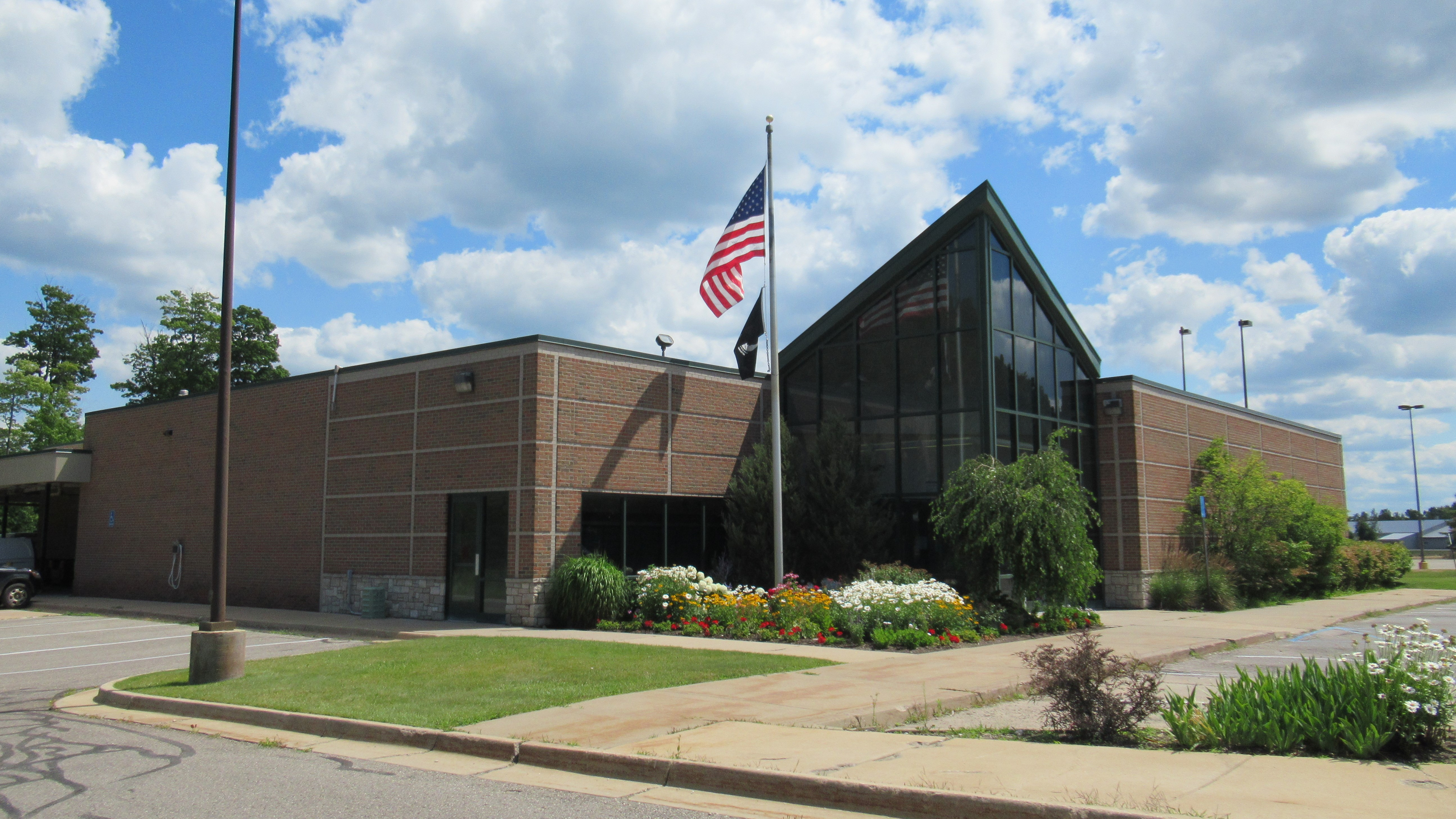
U.S. Post Office in Charlevoix (located in Charlevoix Township)

According to the U.S. Census Bureau, the city has a total area of 2.05 square miles (5.31 km^{2}), all land.

=== Climate ===
This climatic region has large seasonal temperature differences, with warm to hot (and often humid) summers and cold (sometimes severely cold) winters. According to the Köppen Climate Classification system, Charlevoix has a humid continental climate, abbreviated "Dfb" on climate maps.

Climate data for Charlevoix, Michigan (1991–2020 normals, extremes 1891–present)
Month	Jan	Feb	Mar	Apr	May	Jun	Jul	Aug	Sep	Oct	Nov	Dec	Year
Record high °F (°C)	54 (12)	65 (18)	83 (28)	88 (31)	94 (34)	96 (36)	99 (37)	97 (36)	95 (35)	86 (30)	76 (24)	63 (17)	99 (37)
Mean maximum °F (°C)	45.2 (7.3)	47.8 (8.8)	61.0 (16.1)	74.0 (23.3)	84.5 (29.2)	89.0 (31.7)	89.6 (32.0)	88.3 (31.3)	86.8 (30.4)	76.7 (24.8)	63.0 (17.2)	50.3 (10.2)	92.3 (33.5)
Mean daily maximum °F (°C)	28.7 (−1.8)	29.2 (−1.6)	37.1 (2.8)	48.0 (8.9)	61.0 (16.1)	71.0 (21.7)	76.0 (24.4)	75.6 (24.2)	69.8 (21.0)	56.7 (13.7)	44.6 (7.0)	34.5 (1.4)	52.7 (11.5)
Daily mean °F (°C)	23.1 (−4.9)	22.6 (−5.2)	29.4 (−1.4)	40.3 (4.6)	52.0 (11.1)	62.5 (16.9)	68.7 (20.4)	68.1 (20.1)	61.5 (16.4)	49.7 (9.8)	39.1 (3.9)	29.6 (−1.3)	45.5 (7.5)
Mean daily minimum °F (°C)	17.5 (−8.1)	15.9 (−8.9)	21.7 (−5.7)	32.5 (0.3)	43.0 (6.1)	53.9 (12.2)	61.3 (16.3)	60.6 (15.9)	53.3 (11.8)	42.7 (5.9)	33.5 (0.8)	24.6 (−4.1)	38.4 (3.6)
Mean minimum °F (°C)	0.9 (−17.3)	1.0 (−17.2)	3.4 (−15.9)	22.4 (−5.3)	33.3 (0.7)	42.5 (5.8)	51.5 (10.8)	50.8 (10.4)	42.3 (5.7)	31.6 (−0.2)	22.4 (−5.3)	11.2 (−11.6)	−4.1 (−20.1)
Record low °F (°C)	−22 (−30)	−33 (−36)	−16 (−27)	3 (−16)	20 (−7)	32 (0)	41 (5)	37 (3)	32 (0)	24 (−4)	8 (−13)	−8 (−22)	−33 (−36)
Average precipitation inches (mm)	2.27 (58)	1.54 (39)	1.86 (47)	2.92 (74)	3.05 (77)	2.88 (73)	2.72 (69)	3.24 (82)	3.60 (91)	4.33 (110)	2.83 (72)	2.50 (64)	33.74 (857)
Average snowfall inches (cm)	29.9 (76)	19.3 (49)	12.0 (30)	5.0 (13)	0.1 (0.25)	0.0 (0.0)	0.0 (0.0)	0.0 (0.0)	0.0 (0.0)	0.2 (0.51)	6.4 (16)	27.3 (69)	100.2 (255)
Average extreme snow depth inches (cm)	18.6 (47)	16.9 (43)	14.7 (37)	2.9 (7.4)	0.0 (0.0)	0.0 (0.0)	0.0 (0.0)	0.0 (0.0)	0.0 (0.0)	0.0 (0.0)	2.9 (7.4)	12.6 (32)	24.2 (61)
Average precipitation days (≥ 0.01 in)	18.7	13.7	10.4	11.1	12.8	10.5	9.7	10.5	12.4	17.0	15.9	17.5	160.2
Average snowy days (≥ 0.1 in)	15.7	11.4	6.3	2.3	0.2	0.0	0.0	0.0	0.0	0.4	4.9	13.0	54.2
Source: NOAA

== Demographics ==
Historical population
Census	Pop.	Note	%±
1880	512		—
1890	1,496		192.2%
1900	2,079		39.0%
1910	2,420		16.4%
1920	2,218		−8.3%
1930	2,247		1.3%
1940	2,299		2.3%
1950	2,695		17.2%
1960	2,751		2.1%
1970	3,519		27.9%
1980	3,296		−6.3%
1990	3,116		−5.5%
2000	2,994		−3.9%
2010	2,513		−16.1%
2020	2,348		−6.6%
U.S. Decennial Census

=== 2020 census ===
As of the 2020 census, Charlevoix had a population of 2,348. The median age was 55.4 years. 12.6% of residents were under the age of 18 and 33.0% of residents were 65 years of age or older. For every 100 females there were 88.3 males, and for every 100 females age 18 and over there were 86.7 males age 18 and over.

100.0% of residents lived in urban areas, while 0.0% lived in rural areas.

There were 1,252 households in Charlevoix, of which 14.0% had children under the age of 18 living in them. Of all households, 34.7% were married-couple households, 23.3% were households with a male householder and no spouse or partner present, and 35.8% were households with a female householder and no spouse or partner present. About 47.1% of all households were made up of individuals and 24.1% had someone living alone who was 65 years of age or older.

There were 2,148 housing units, of which 41.7% were vacant. The homeowner vacancy rate was 2.6% and the rental vacancy rate was 7.9%.

Racial composition as of the 2020 census
Race	Number	Percent
White	2,187	93.1%
Black or African American	11	0.5%
American Indian and Alaska Native	20	0.9%
Asian	11	0.5%
Native Hawaiian and Other Pacific Islander	1	0.0%
Some other race	14	0.6%
Two or more races	104	4.4%
Hispanic or Latino (of any race)	26	1.1%

=== 2010 census ===
As of the census of 2010, there were 2,513 people, 1,266 households, and 651 families residing in the city. The population density was 1,225.9 inhabitants per square mile (473.3/km^{2}). There were 2,201 housing units at an average density of 1,073.7 per square mile (414.6/km^{2}). The racial makeup of the city was 94.2% White, 1.2% African American, 2.0% Native American, 0.5% Asian, 0.2% from other races, and 1.8% from two or more races. Hispanic or Latino of any race were 0.9% of the population.

There were 1,266 households, of which 20.3% had children under the age of 18 living with them, 36.9% were married couples living together, 10.7% had a female householder with no husband present, 3.8% had a male householder with no wife present, and 48.6% were non-families. 42.5% of all households were made up of individuals, and 18.9% had someone living alone who was 65 years of age or older. The average household size was 1.94 and the average family size was 2.61.

The median age in the city was 48.1 years. 17.5% of residents were under the age of 18; 7.9% were between the ages of 18 and 24; 19.8% were from 25 to 44; 31.3% were from 45 to 64; and 23.6% were 65 years of age or older. The gender makeup of the city was 47.2% male and 52.8% female.

=== 2000 census ===
As of the census of 2000, there were 2,994 people, 1,375 households, and 812 families residing in the city. The population density was 1,465.8 inhabitants per square mile (565.9/km^{2}). There were 2,096 housing units at an average density of 1,026.2 per square mile (396.2/km^{2}). The racial makeup of the city was 94.92% White, 0.27% African American, 2.84% Native American, 0.20% Asian, 0.43% from other races, and 1.34% from two or more races. Hispanic or Latino of any race were 1.24% of the population.

There were 1,375 households, out of which 25.7% had children under the age of 18 living with them, 46.7% were married couples living together, 9.6% had a female householder with no husband present, and 40.9% were non-families. 35.4% of all households were made up of individuals, and 15.2% had someone living alone who was 65 years of age or older. The average household size was 2.14 and the average family size was 2.76.

In the city, 21.6% of the population was the age of 18, 8.4% from 18 to 24, 26.4% from 25 to 44, 24.2% from 45 to 64, and 19.4% who were 65 years of age or older. The median age was 41 years. For every 100 females, there were 88.7 males. For every 100 females age 18 and over, there were 84.0 males.

The median income for a household in the city was $35,284, and the median income for a family was $42,853. Males had a median income of $31,544 versus $24,375 for females. The per capita income for the city was $21,319. About 3.7% of families and 9.5% of the population were below the poverty line, including 6.8% of those under age 18 and 9.1% of those age 65 or over.

== Culture ==
Los Angeles-based singer/songwriter Joe Henry, who spent much of his childhood in Michigan, includes a song entitled "Charlevoix" on his 1990 album Shuffletown.

=== Festivals ===
- Petunia Planting- Petunia planting began in 1982 when "Keep Charlevoix Beautiful" organization member Dale Boss had a vision to line the streets of the city with thousands of petunias from the north side of the city limit all the way to the south and "Operation Petunia" began. Now, every Thursday before Memorial Day hundreds of residents gather to plant over 60,000 petunias up and down Main Street.
- Venetian-The Venetian Festival began in 1931 with a very simple boat show in Charlevoix's Round Lake and has now grown into a week-long festival bringing in tens of thousands of people and costing $200,000. Venetian now includes two nights of some of the best fireworks in Northern Michigan, big name concerts, a parade, athletic events, a carnival, a boat parade, and many more family friendly and adult activities.
- Apple Fest- The 30th annual Apple Festival was celebrated in October 2008. The Apple Festival celebrates one of Northern Michigan's most prominent fruits, the apple. It gives local farmers the chance to sell their harvest right in the downtown Charlevoix area. The festival also includes pony rides, face painting, a craft show and many more activities to draw in tourism.

=== Tourism ===
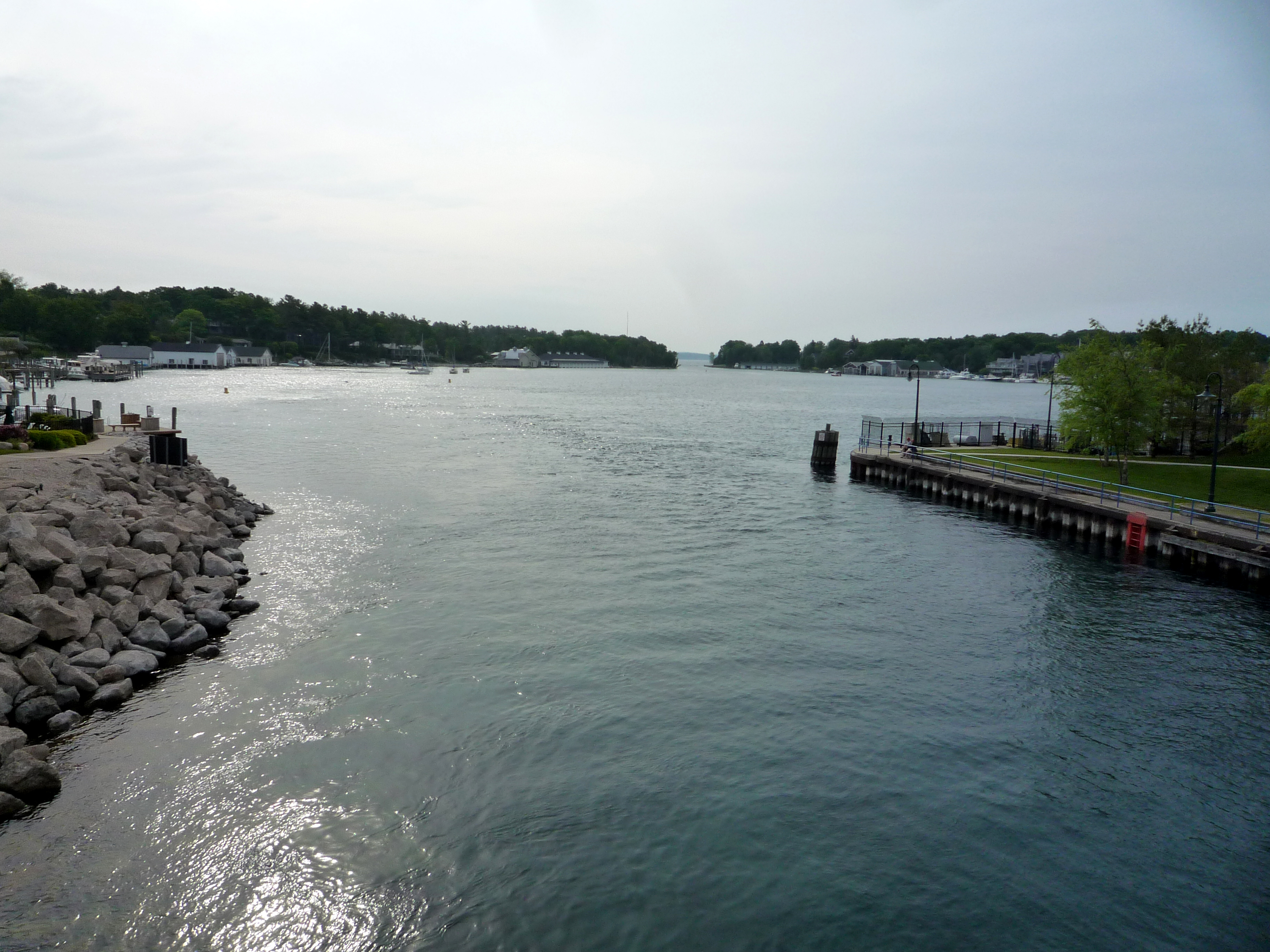
View of Round Lake from downtown Charlevoix

Charlevoix bills itself as "Charlevoix the Beautiful" on its promotional literature and on municipal signs around the city. This moniker was also the name of a book by prominent local "stone house" architect Earl Young.

== Transportation ==
=== Water ===
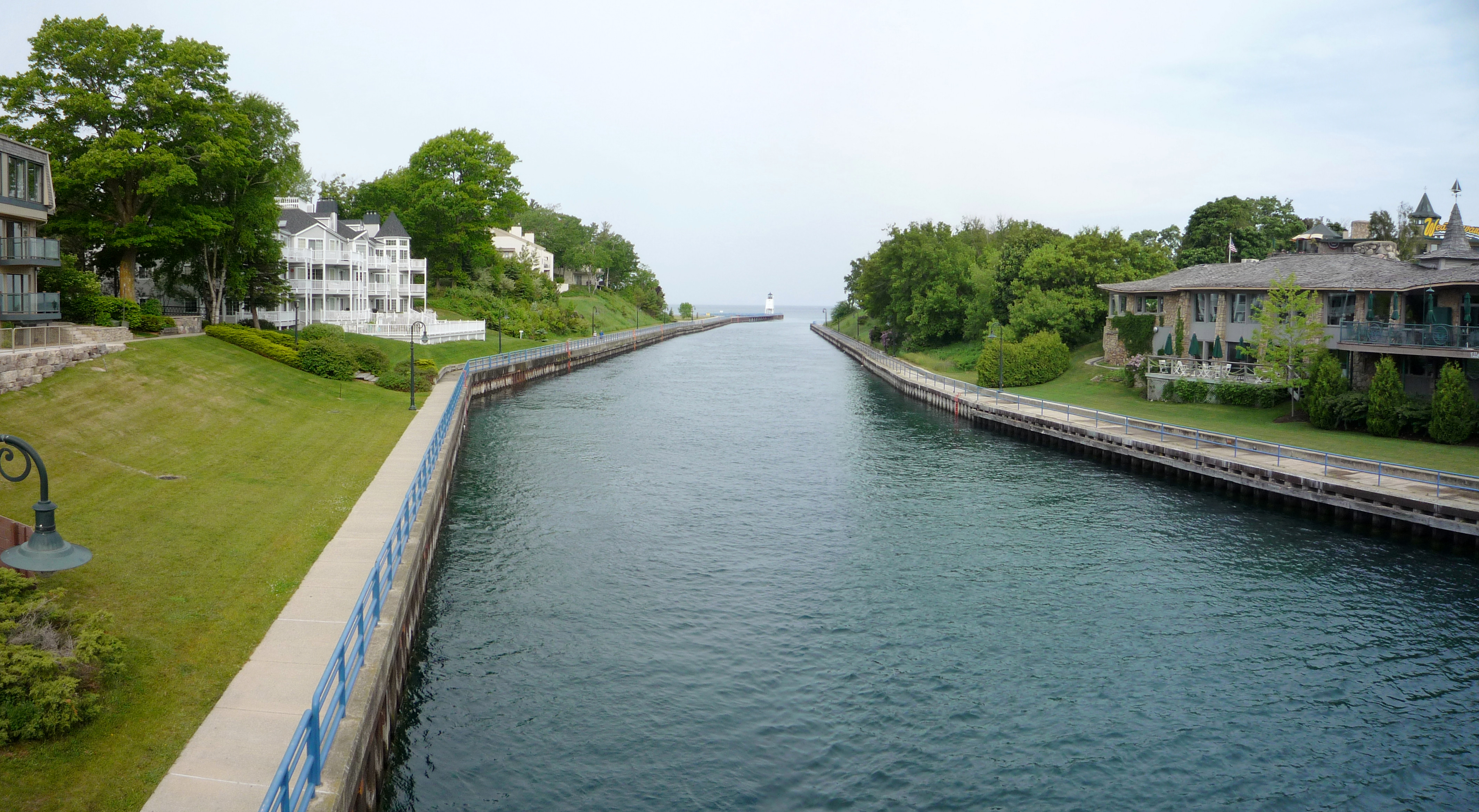
The short Pine River flows through downtown, past the Charlevoix South Pier Light Station, and into Lake Michigan

The town is situated between Lake Michigan and the western end of Lake Charlevoix, which drains into Lake Michigan through the short Round Lake/Pine River complex in the heart of downtown Charlevoix. The Charlevoix South Pier Light Station marks the opening of the channel onto Lake Michigan. Charlevoix's Round Lake has been called the best natural harbor on Lake Michigan. The only way to get from Lake Michigan to East Jordan, Boyne City and other sites on Lake Charlevoix by boat is via Charlevoix. As a result, much commercial, industrial, and recreational boat traffic passes through Charlevoix.

=== U.S. Coast Guard Station ===
The town of Charlevoix has a U.S. Coast Guard station located in its vicinity. Station Charlevoix has served the waters of Lake Charlevoix and Lake Michigan for over one hundred years. The station was first sited in 1898 on the south break wall of the Pine River Channel, leading into Lake Michigan. It was officially commissioned as a United States Lifesaving Service Station July 5, 1900. During the early 1960s, the station was relocated to its present-day location along the Pine River Channel's Lake Charlevoix end. The area of response for Station Charlevoix runs from Cross Village down to Leland, extending into Lake Michigan through Beaver Island and the North and South Fox Islands, and covers numerous inland lakes and waterways. Spring through late fall the 41' UTB and the 25' RB-S are in operation and during the winter months, the 14' ice skiff is put into operation. There is also a U.S. Coast Guard Auxiliary Flotilla based at the Station. Some USCG Auxiliary surface facilities are occasionally moored at Station Charlevoix.

=== Major highways ===
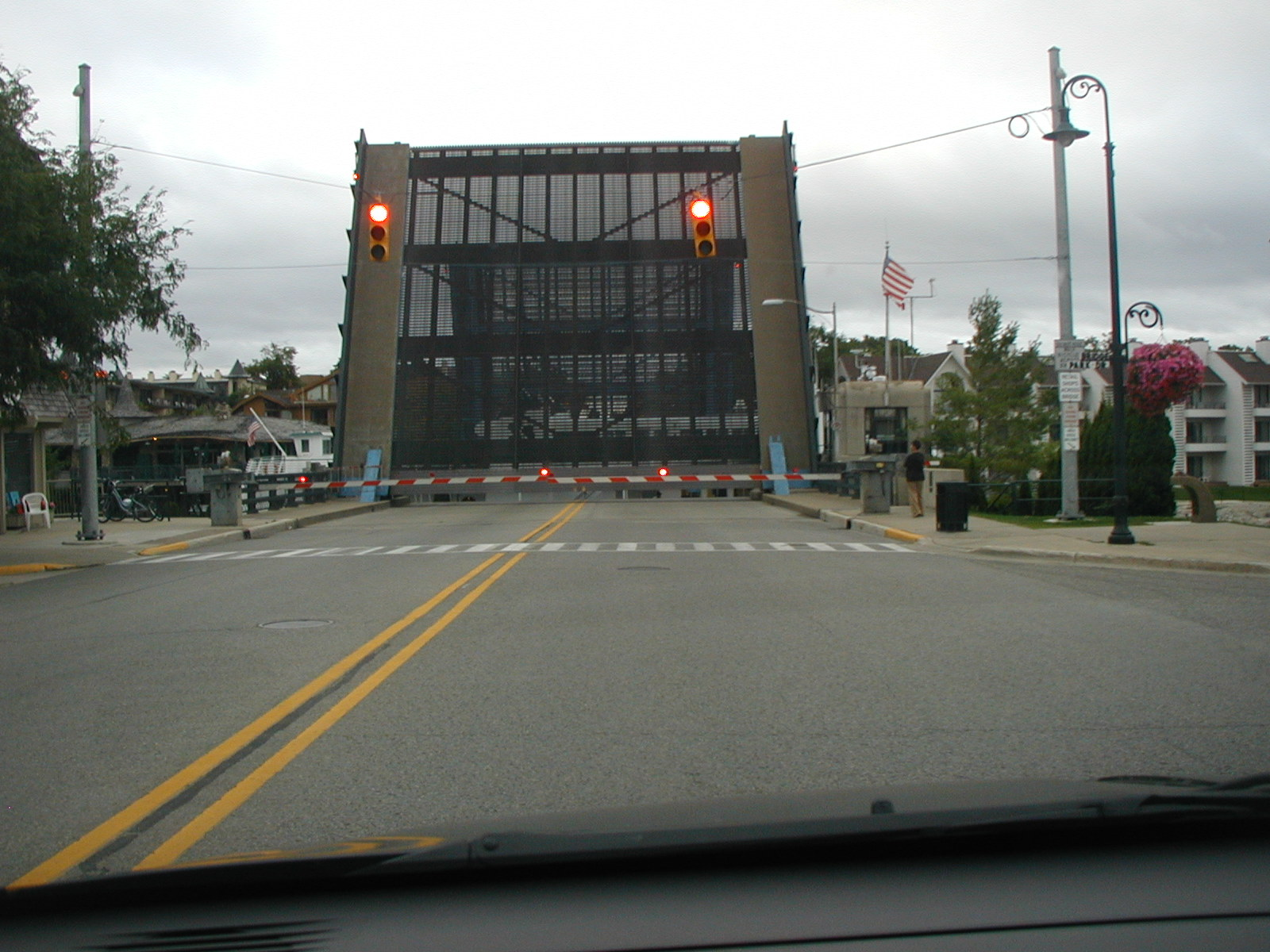
The US-31–Island Lake Outlet Bridge, a bascule bridge in Charlevoix that carries US 31

- US 31 is a major highway running through the heart of the city. It continues southerly toward Traverse City and Muskegon and northerly toward Petoskey to a terminus near Mackinaw City.
- M-66 terminates at US 31 in Charlevoix and continues southerly through East Jordan and Kalkaska en route to the southern part of the state.
- C-56 begins at US 31 just northeast of the city and continues east-southeasterly toward Boyne City.
- C-65 ends at US 31 immediately west of the M-66 junction on the south side of the city. This route continues southerly toward Ellsworth and Central Lake.

=== Bus ===
- The Charlevoix County Transit System provides demand responsive transport, or dial-a-ride, bus service Monday-Saturday for the entire county. Fares are distance based.
- Indian Trails provides daily intercity bus service between Grand Rapids, Michigan and Petoskey, Michigan.

=== Rail ===
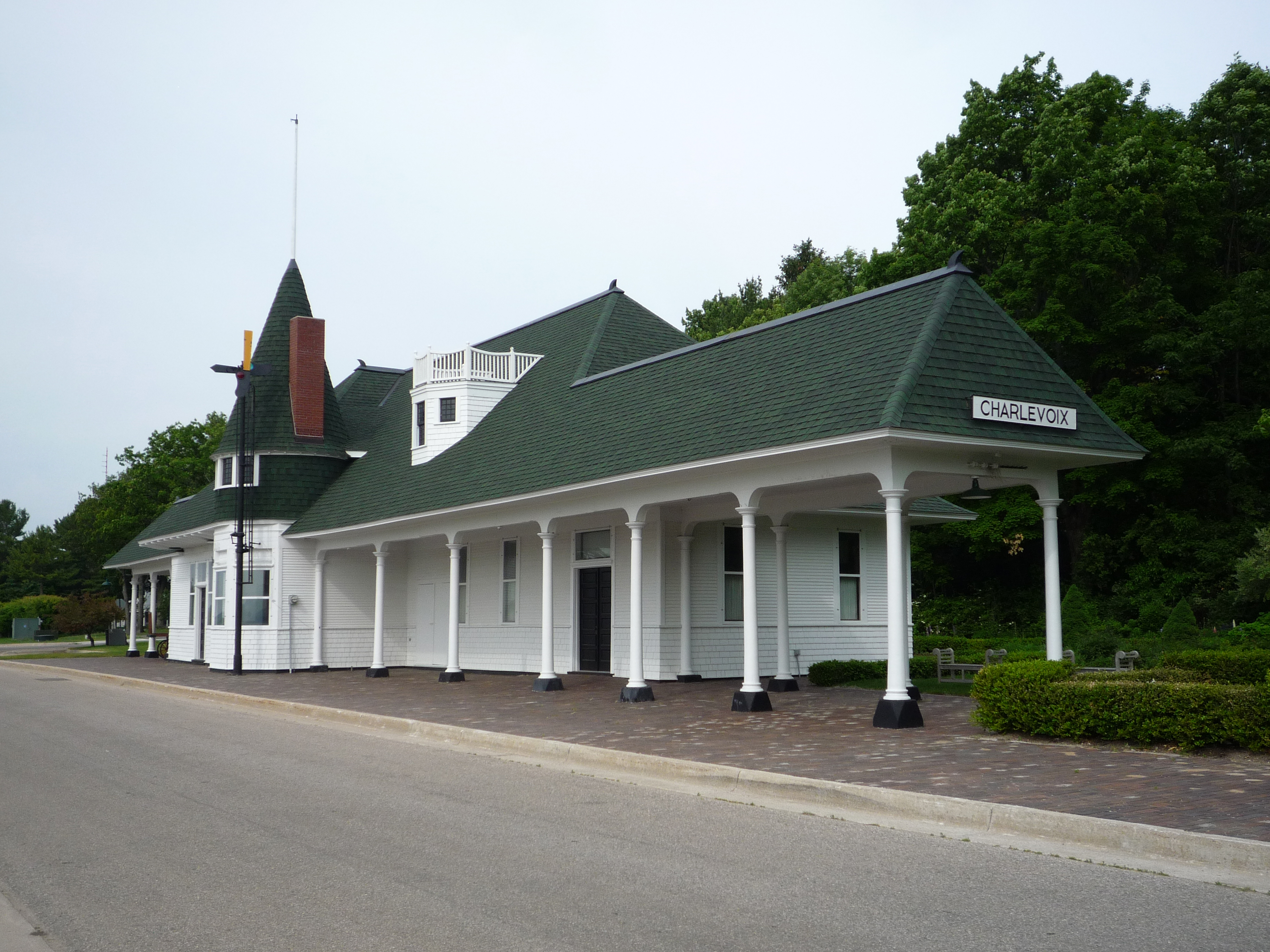
Charlevoix Depot Museum is housed in the original train station; it is listed on the National Register of Historic Places.

Regular intercity passenger train service ended on September 1, 1962, after the Chesapeake and Ohio Railway (C&O) discontinued Traverse City, Michigan – Charlevoix – Petoskey, Michigan service. Freight rail service ended between Charlevoix and Williamsburg, Michigan in 1982 after C&O Railroad abandoned the track. The tracks were removed in 1983. The state of Michigan purchased the track between Charlevoix and Petoskey from the C&O Railroad and contracted Michigan Northern Railway to operate it. This section of track was removed in the 1990s because of a series of washouts and no rail freight customers in Charlevoix. Sections of this rail line now serve as a bicycle trail. The Charlevoix railroad depot has been adapted as a museum of the Charlevoix Historical Society.

=== Air ===
- Charlevoix Municipal Airport is a public airport. In addition to private planes, the airport offers charter flights to Beaver Island and other locations (via Island Airways and Fresh Air Aviation).

== Media ==
Charlevoix is primarily served by four newspapers: the Charlevoix Courier, the Petoskey News Review, the Traverse City Record-Eagle, and the Detroit Free Press. Most television and radio stations are based in Traverse City and serve all of the Northern Michigan region including Charlevoix.

== Notable people ==
- Robert Boss, professional football player.
- Bob Carey, All-American football and track-and-field athlete.
- Zach Hankins (born 1996), basketball player for Hapoel Jerusalem of the Israeli Basketball Premier League
- Ernest Hemingway, iconic author, spent his boyhood summers in the area, setting many of his Nick Adams Stories on or near Lake Charlevoix.
- Albert Loeb, lawyer and vice president of Sears and Roebuck who built the Castle Farm test farm complex in Charlevoix.
- Richard Albert Loeb, son of Albert, of Leopold and Loeb murder trial fame.
- Jetty Rae, musician and independent artist.
- John Bennett Ramsey, businessman, father of JonBenet Ramsey, resided in Charlevoix.
- JonBenét Ramsey summered here with her family until her death in 1996, and her family moved here after her murder.
- Willard J. Smith, thirteenth Commandant of the United States Coast Guard.
- Glendon Swarthout, novelist.
- Edward Carson Waller, Prominent Chicago real estate developer, Spent much time in Charlevoix and developed Waller farm in which covered much of the northern end of town along Lake Michigan. Waller Rd. in Charlevoix is named for him.
- Alson Wood, Wisconsin politician, lived in Charlevoix.
- Earl Young, builder of distinctive stone houses
