= SS Milwaukee (1902) =

Great lakes train ferry that foundered in a storm

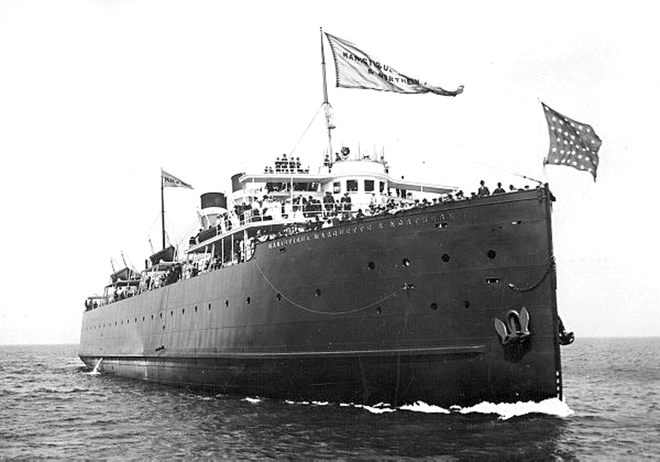
- The Milwaukee when she was named Manistique-Marquette & Northern No. 1

History

United States
- Name: Manistique-Marquette & Northern No. 1 (1902-1909); Milwaukee (1909-1929)
- Owner: Manistique-Marquette & Northern Railroad Co., Manistique, Michigan; Grand Trunk Milwaukee Car Ferry Company, Milwaukee
- Builder: American Ship Building Company, Cleveland, Ohio
- Yard number: 413
- Launched: December 6, 1902
- In service: 1903
- Out of service: 1929
- Identification: Official number: 93363
- Fate: Sank, October 22, 1929

General characteristics
- Tonnage: 2,933 GRT; 1,755 NRT
- Length: 338 ft (103 m)
- Beam: 56 ft (17 m)
- Depth: 19 ft (5.8 m)
- MILWAUKEE (steam screw) Shipwreck
- U.S. National Register of Historic Places
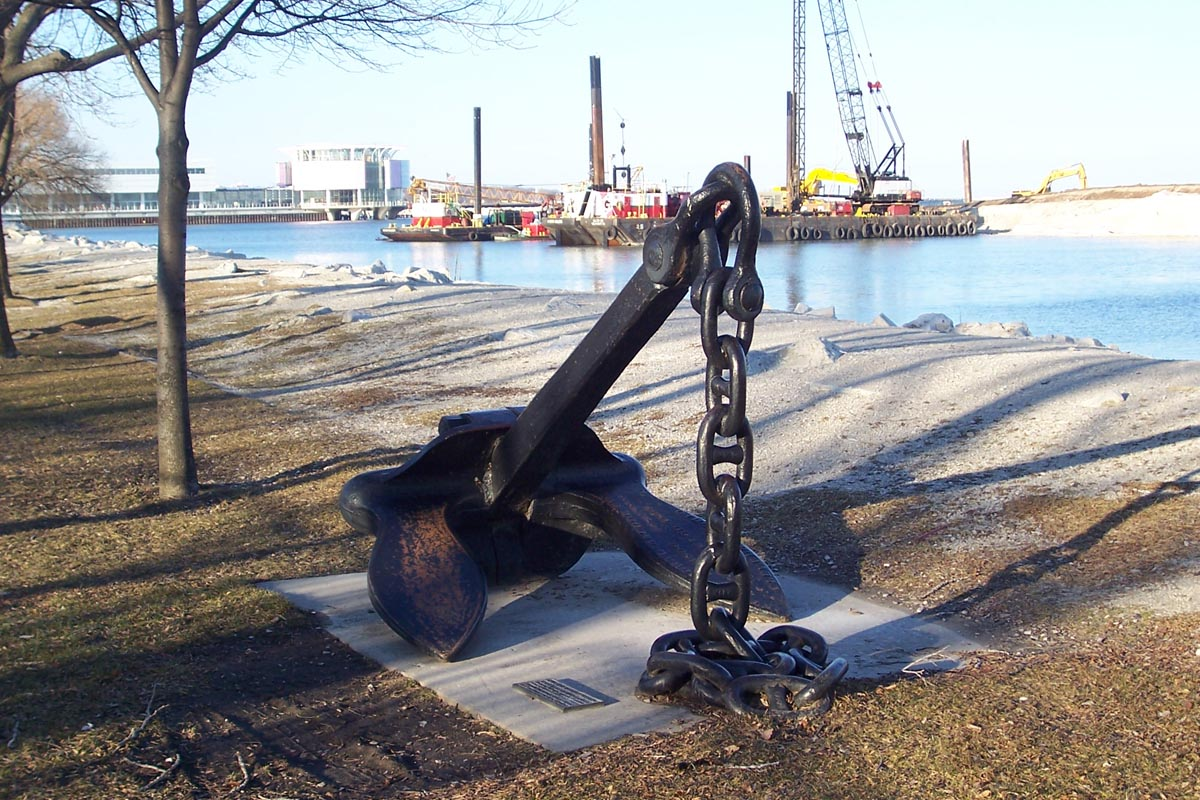
- Anchor from SS Milwaukee, recovered in 1973

- Location within Wisconsin Location within the United States
- Nearest city: Fox Point, Wisconsin
- Coordinates: 43.136317°N 87.832283°W
- Built: 1902
- Architect: American Ship Building Company
- Architectural style: Train ferry
- NRHP reference No.: 15000479
- Added to NRHP: July 27, 2015

SS Milwaukee was a train ferry that served on Lake Michigan. It was launched in 1902 and sank with all hands off Milwaukee on October 22, 1929. Fifty-two men were lost with the vessel.

== Ship history ==
The ship was built by the American Ship Building Company of Cleveland, Ohio, and launched on December 6, 1902. Initially owned by the Manistique-Marquette & Northern Railroad Company of Manistique, Michigan, she initially operated between Northport, Michigan and Manistique, Michigan under the name Manistique-Marquette & Northern No. 1. Traffic on this route was proved unprofitable, and in 1904 the MM&N declared bankruptcy. The Pere Marquette Railway gained a controlling interest in the insolvent railroad and carferry, and the ship was diverted to a route between Ludington, Michigan and Manistique until 1906, when the Pere Marquette also collapsed. Manistique Marquette & Northern No. 1 returned to the Northport-Manistique route until 1908, when the MM&N was reorganized as the Manistique & Northern Railroad with financial backing from the Ann Arbor Railroad.

The following year she was sold to the Grand Trunk Milwaukee Car Ferry Company and renamed Milwaukee. Along with the Grand Trunk's first car ferry, Grand Haven, Milwaukee shuttled railroad cars back and forth from Milwaukee to the Grand Trunk Railway's dock in Grand Haven in western Michigan. This route enabled shippers to avoid the crowded railroad yards and sidings of Chicago. Milwaukee was home-ported in the city for which it was named, but dispatched the Michigan side of the lake. The docks of the Grand Trunk Milwaukee Car Ferry Company were located on the Kinnickinnic River, and their ferries were familiar sights to residents of Jones Island.

== Sinking ==
Around 2:00 pm on October 22, 1929, the Milwaukee sailed off bound for Grand Haven into a Lake Michigan storm, and was lost. The Milwaukee had been loaded earlier that day with 27 railcars, with freight including lumber, perishable foods, bathtubs and Nash automobiles. The Milwaukee was last seen passing by U.S. Lightship 95 (LV-95/WAL-519), a ship anchored three miles offshore, serving as a lighthouse. The Milwaukee was reported to be pitching and rolling heavily as it disappeared into the rainy mist. The ship did not have radio equipment.

It was considered routine for the Milwaukee to challenge stormy weather on Lake Michigan. This time, however, some of the 27 railroad cars in the ship's hold came loose in the 37 mph (32 kn; 60 km/h) gale. Their momentum created metal failure and partly crumpled the ferry’s sea gate, a movable steel shield that, when operating properly, served as part of the vessel’s freeboard. This failure, in turn, enabled water to come in through the stern and sink the ship. The captain, Robert H. McKay, apparently turned back for Milwaukee, but never made it.

On October 24, aircraft searched Lake Michigan, but found nothing.

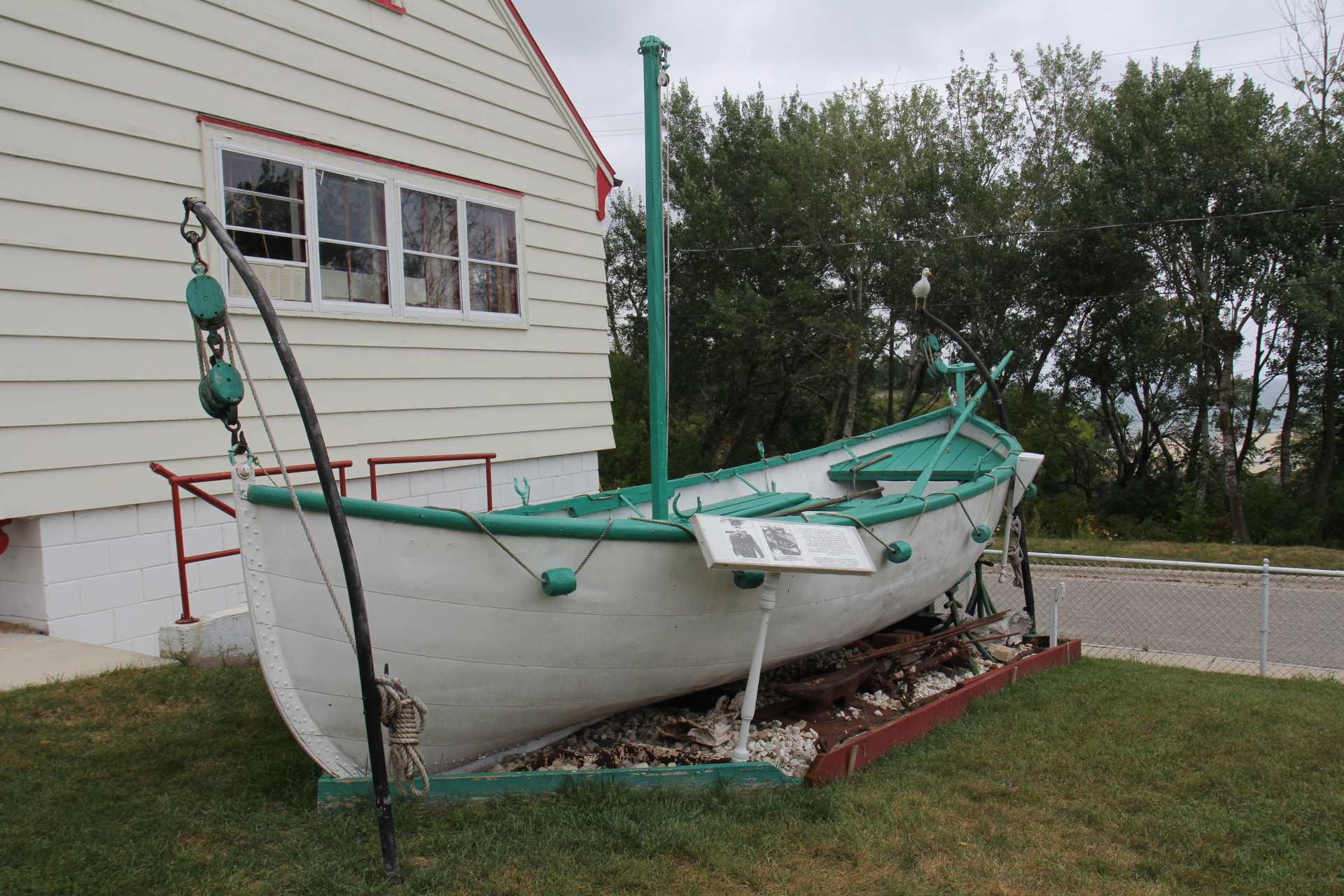
Lifeboat found near Holland, Michigan with four dead occupants

Some of the lifeboats were launched by the crew, and the bodies of two crew members wearing SS Milwaukee lifejackets were picked up two days later by the steamer, SS Steel Chemist, off Kenosha, Wisconsin, and two more, including the body of Captain McKay, were found by the coast guard at Kenosha later that day. A lifeboat containing four dead crew members was found on 26 October floating near Holland, Michigan, on the other side of the lake. That lifeboat is now located at the 1860 Light Station and Museum in Port Washington, Wisconsin and is on display as permanent museum exhibit.

On October 27, an empty lifeboat was found floating near Grand Haven, Michigan. On further investigation, it was found that the ship's message case was floating nearby with an apparent final message: "Oct. 22, 1929. 8:30 pm. The ship is making water fast. We have turned around and headed for Milwaukee. Pumps are working, but sea gate is bent in and can't keep the water out. Flicker is flooded. Seas are tremendous. Things look bad. Crew roll is about the same as last payday. A.R. Sadon, Purser."

Another note, found in a bottle, read: "This is the worst storm I have ever seen. Can't stay up much longer. Hole in side of boat."

All 52 people on board were lost, while 15 bodies were recovered. The watch on one of those crew members was stopped at 9:35. As the years passed, interest in the circumstances around the loss of the ship was occasionally rekindled. For example, the story was retold by marine historian Dwight Boyer in his Ghost Ships of the Great Lakes in 1968.

== City of Milwaukee ==
As a result of the loss of SS Milwaukee, the Grand Trunk needed a new train ferry. The replacement was SS City of Milwaukee, launched November 25, 1930. The replacement vessel is now a museum ship and National Historic Landmark.

== The train ferry rediscovered ==
In April 1972, the wreck was located in Lake Michigan, seven miles northeast of Milwaukee, Wisconsin, three miles offshore (on a line between Milwaukee and Grand Haven), at 43°08′11″N 87°49′55″W, in 90–120 ft (27–37 m) of water.

In March 2006, the History Channel television program Deep Sea Detectives premiered an episode entitled "Train Wreck in Lake Michigan", which profiled the loss of the Milwaukee through historical documents, interviews with historians and dives to the wreck itself. The show highlighted the fact that there were missing hatch covers between the track deck and compartments below, including the engine room and the crew quarters (Flicker), that probably allowed those areas to become flooded and thus contributed to the sinking of the ship.
