= Michigan Interstate Railway =

Railway

Overview
- Reporting mark: AA
- Locale: Michigan
- Dates of operation: 1977–1988
- Successor: Ann Arbor Railroad

Technical
- Track gauge: 4 ft 8 1/2 in (1,435 mm) standard gauge

The Michigan Interstate Railway (reporting mark AA) was formed on August 27, 1977, to operate the Ann Arbor Railroad main line from Toledo, Ohio, to Elberta, Michigan. It succeeded Conrail as the designated operator of the line; Conrail had operated the line since 1976, following the Ann Arbor Railroad's bankruptcy.

The Ann Arbor Railroad (1895–1976) had declared bankruptcy and was included in the assets of Conrail, formed on April 1, 1976. The MIRC operated until October 7, 1988, when the Ann Arbor Acquisition Corporation acquired all assets.

== Operations ==
The Michigan Interstate Railway operated over the Ann Arbor Railroad main line from Toledo, Ohio to Elberta, Michigan. The MIRC assumed operations from Conrail on October 1, 1977, and operated until October 7, 1988. Elberta was the site of the railroad's ferry operations. The ferry operations ceased in April 1982 and service north of Cadillac, Michigan was reduced to a sand pit just south of Yuma, Michigan. Additionally, the Tuscola and Saginaw Bay Railway acquired operations north of Ann Arbor, Michigan in 1982. In 1983, the MIRC filed for reorganization and the trustee for the estate purchased the remaining portion of the MIRC from Toledo, Ohio to Ann Arbor, Michigan in September 1985. The MIRC continued to operate until October 7, 1988, when all assets were acquired by the Ann Arbor Acquisition Corporation.

== Roster ==
The Michigan Interstate Railway operated equipment that had been used by the previous operator, the Ann Arbor Railroad. The Ann Arbor Railroad purchased ten new EMD GP35s in 1962 that were built and delivered in 1963. When the MIRC assumed operations in 1977, the EMD GP35s were in a state of disrepair. The MIRC rebuilt eight of the EMD GP35s for service. Additionally, the MIRC also operated three ALCO S-3s, two ALCO RS-1s, and two ALCO RS-2s.
