= Gilmore Township, Michigan =

Gilmore Township is the name of some places in the U.S. state of Michigan:

- Gilmore Township, Benzie County, Michigan
- Gilmore Township, Isabella County, Michigan
