= Manistique and Lake Superior Railroad =

Railway line in Michigan, United States

Overview
- Headquarters: Manistique, Michigan
- Locale: Michigan
- Dates of operation: 1909–1968

Technical
- Track gauge: 4 ft 8 1/2 in (1,435 mm) standard gauge

The Manistique and Lake Superior Railroad (M&LS) was an American Class III railroad serving the Upper Peninsula of Michigan from 1909 to 1968. It provided service from Manistique, Michigan to a junction with the Duluth, South Shore and Atlantic Railway at Doty, Michigan, southeast of Munising, Michigan. Its nickname was The Haywire.

The M&LS was chartered in 1909 to penetrate what was then a booming lumber and pulpwood region of the central Upper Peninsula. Almost from the start, it served as an affiliate of the Ann Arbor Railroad and was connected with the larger railroad's northwestern terminus at Elberta, Michigan, by Ann Arbor Railroad car ferry. The Elberta-Manistique run was one of the longest regularly scheduled railroad car ferry runs operated in North America.

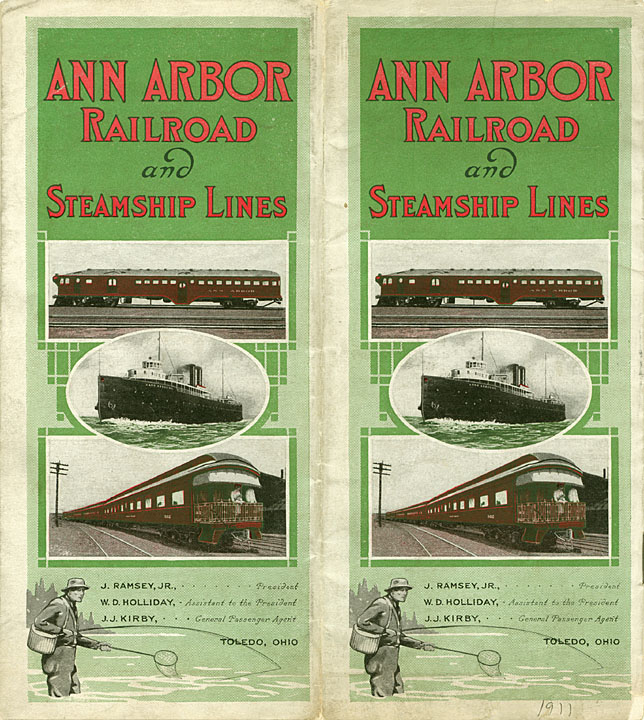
The Ann Arbor used a car ferry such as the one pictured on this 1911 timetable to serve Manistique and the M&LS.

The M&LS connected with the Duluth, South Shore and Atlantic Railway in Shingleton, just east of Munising, and with the Lake Superior and Ishpeming Railroad at Doty, as well as with the Soo Line in its headquarters of Manistique.

After the old-growth timber of the central U.P. had been harvested, the transportation needs of the local area served by the Manistique & Lake Superior declined. While the cold, swampy region continued to yield pulpwood, the construction of M-94 generally parallel to the M&LS right-of-way further reduced the need for the little railroad. By the 1960s, the Manistique & Lake Superior had been reduced to only one working locomotive, an Alco S-3 bought in the mid-1950's, M&LS 1. The railroad and its car ferry ceased operations in July 1968. The locomotive continued operation on the Ann Arbor Railroad, renumbered AA 10.

== Current status ==
In 1970, the abandoned railroad grade was adapted to serve as the Haywire Grade Rail Trail, one of Michigan's first rail trails. The 32-mile-long Haywire Trail follows most of the former railroad's right-of-way from Manistique to Shingleton. A graded, unpaved trail, the Haywire is adapted for snowmobiles and hikers, and is sub-standard for bicycle use. In 2017, mile markers were installed.
