= M168 =

M168 or M-168 may refer to:

- a mutation found in the haplogroup CT of Y-DNA, in human genetics
- M-168 (Michigan highway), a former state highway in Michigan
- M168, a 20 mm rotary cannon mounted on the M163 VADS
