= Ann Arbor Railroad main line =

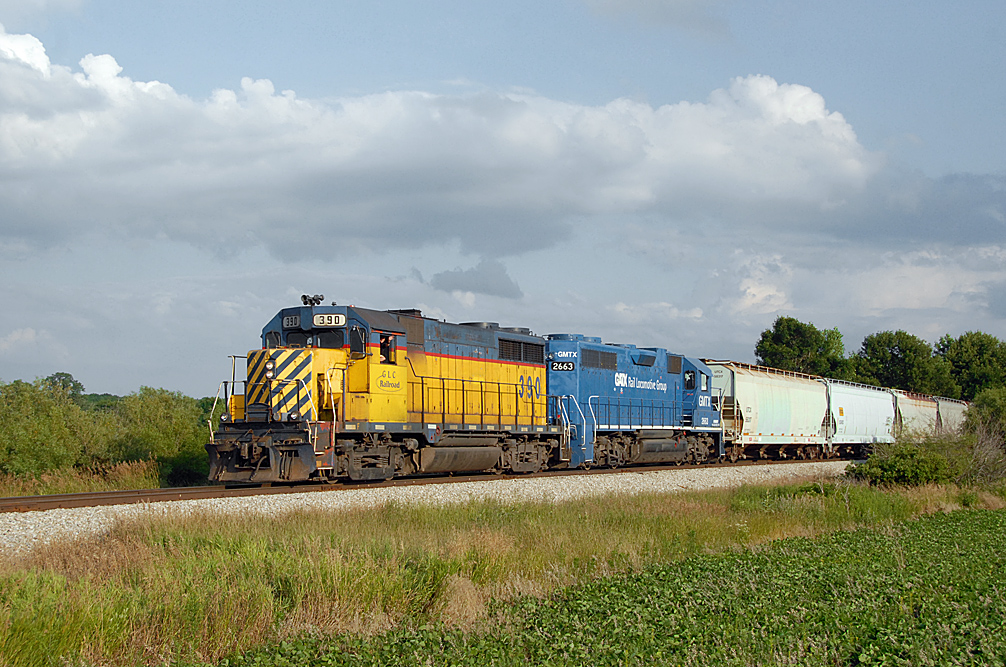
- A Great Lakes Central Railroad freight train north of Alma in 2009

Overview
- Owner: State of Michigan (Yuma–Owosso, Durand–Ann Arbor); Huron and Eastern Railway (Owosso–Corunna); Ann Arbor Railroad (Ann Arbor–Toledo)
- Locale: Michigan and Ohio

History
- Opened: June 21, 1878

Technical
- Line length: 292.2 mi (470.3 km)
- Track gauge: 1,435 mm (4 ft 8 1/2 in) standard gauge

The main line of Ann Arbor Railroad is a partially-abandoned railway line in the states of Michigan and Ohio. It was constructed between 1874 and 1897 by the Ann Arbor Railroad and its predecessors, and constituted that company's main line. At its fullest extent it ran 292 miles (470 km) from Toledo, Ohio, on Lake Erie, to Frankfort, Michigan, on Lake Michigan. A train ferry service operated across Lake Michigan to Wisconsin. The original Ann Arbor Railroad went bankrupt in 1976, and ownership of the line is now split between the state of Michigan and two short-line railroads: the Ann Arbor Railroad (founded in 1988) and the Huron and Eastern Railway. The northern end of the line is now near Yuma, Michigan.

== History ==
=== Construction ===
The Toledo, Ann Arbor and Northern Railroad, founded in 1869, graded a line between Ann Arbor, Michigan, and the Ohio border, but was a casualty of the Panic of 1873. The Toledo and Ann Arbor Railroad, founded by James Mitchell Ashley, completed the line in 1878. Regular service began on June 21. (Note: Willis Dunbar gave the date as May 16, 1879. Meints in an earlier work gave August 1881.) A short section of the line within Toledo was built by the Toledo and State Line Railroad in 1874. That company was leased by the Pennsylvania Railroad between 1874 and 1878.

The further development of the Ann Arbor main line was pursued by Ashley through a series of companies which extended the line into northern Michigan. Initially, Ashley intended to extend northeast towards Pontiac, Michigan. The Toledo, Ann Arbor and Grand Trunk Railroad built 15 miles (24 km) north to South Lyon via Leland. The line opened in August 1881. In South Lyon the line connected with the Detroit, Lansing and Northern Railroad. The company abandoned further expansion toward Pontiac, shifting its attention toward Durand.

The basis of the Ann Arbor's northern extension was the Owosso and North Western Railroad, which had graded a line between Owosso and St. Louis. The Toledo, Ann Arbor and North Michigan Railway, successor to the Toledo, Ann Arbor and Grand Trunk, acquired the graded roadbed and right-of-way and completed the line in August 1884. The Toledo, Ann Arbor and North Michigan built a third disconnected segment in 1885 between Durand and Lakeland, Michigan; trackage rights over the Detroit, Grand Haven and Milwaukee Railway to the north and the Michigan Air Line Railroad to the south permitted through operation. In 1886 the company completed its own lines to connect the disparate sections.

The planned route north of St. Louis would have bypassed Alma. In response, local businessmen founded the Lansing, Alma, Mt. Pleasant and Northern Railroad, which in 1885 began building a line between Alma and Mount Pleasant, to the north. Ashley acquired that company in 1886, and completed the line to Mount Pleasant that July. In the south, the former grade of the Chicago, Saginaw and Canada Railroad was used to connect St. Louis and Alma. The Toledo, Ann Arbor and Cadillac Railway undertook the next phase of the expansion, beginning in 1886. As before, the grade of a previous company was incorporated, in this case the Lake George and Muskegon River Railroad. The extension between Cadillac and Mount Pleasant opened in August 1888. (Note: The company crossed the diamond of the Grand Rapids and Indiana Railroad in Cadillac in 1887, which is the date Dunbar gives.)

Ashley selected Frankfort as the Lake Michigan outlet of the line. The Frankfort and South Eastern Railroad, backed by local businessmen, was already building eastward to Copemish. Using another new company, the Toledo, Ann Arbor and Lake Michigan Railway, the line was extended west from Cadillac to Copemish. The two lines met in Copemish in November 1889. Train ferry operations from Elberta, across Betsie Lake from Frankfort, began in 1892.

=== Ann Arbor Railroad ===
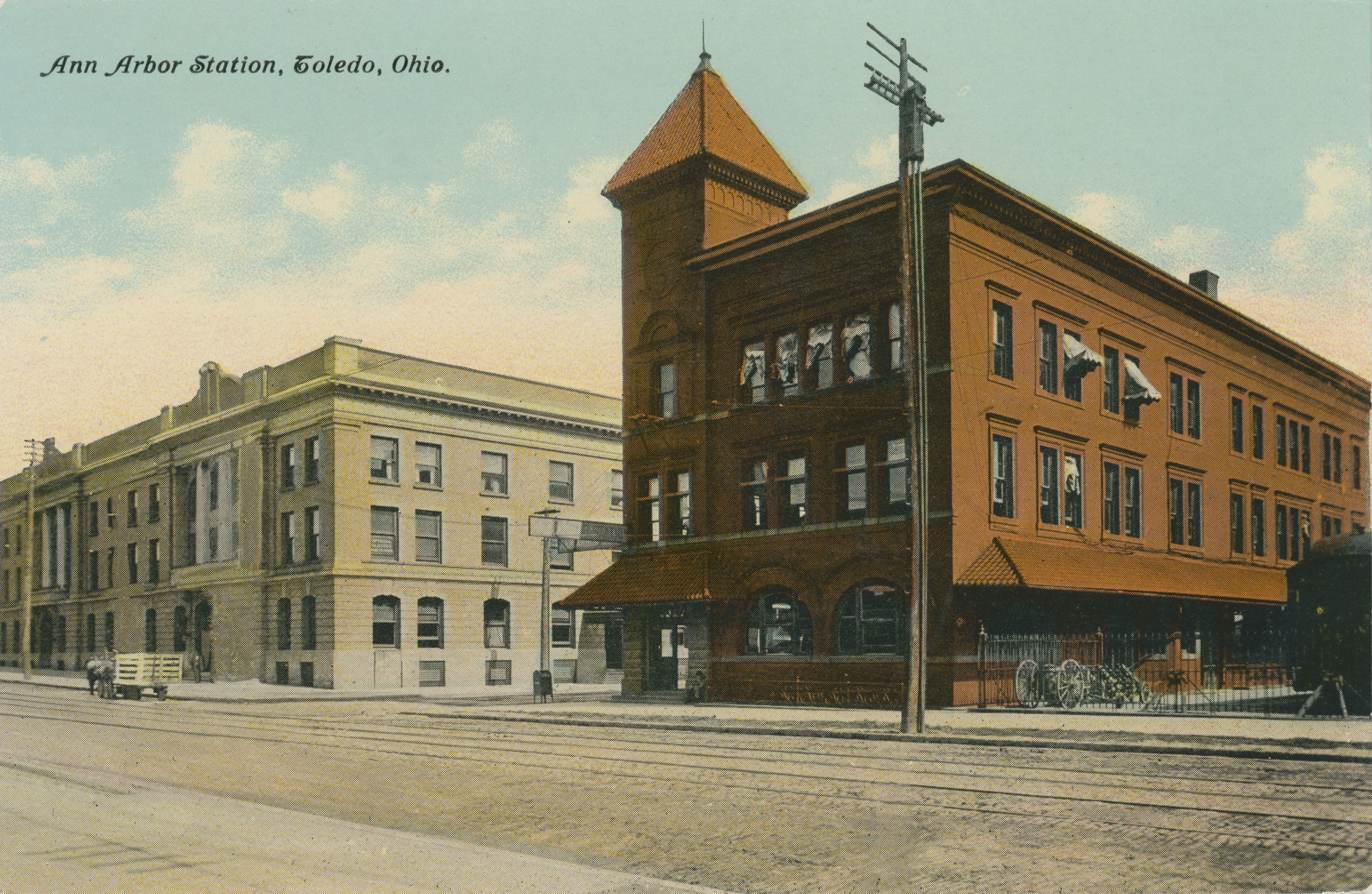
Cherry Street station in Toledo

The Toledo, Ann Arbor and North Michigan Railroad entered bankruptcy during the Panic of 1893, and James Ashley resigned as president in 1894. The company was reorganized in 1895 as the Ann Arbor Railroad. In 1896, the Ann Arbor completed a 7-mile (11 km) cutoff north of Ann Arbor, bypassing the original route via Leland. A more significant change came in 1897, when the line was re-routed in Gratiot County to serve Alma directly, bypassing St. Louis. The basis of this re-route was the line of the Ithaca and Alma Railroad, purchased from the Detroit, Grand Rapids and Western Railroad. This change led to a lawsuit from residents in St. Louis who had backed the initial line. Also in 1897 the Ann Arbor built a new station in Toledo at Cherry and Seneca, 2.5 miles (4.0 km) from the main line.

Passenger service ended in 1950, and the station at Cherry Street in Toledo was demolished in 1964.

=== Post–Ann Arbor ===
The Ann Arbor Railroad entered bankruptcy in 1973. The United States Railway Association (USRA) evaluated the line for inclusion into the Conrail network. The USRA recommended only the Toledo–Ann Arbor section (and Saline Branch) for inclusion. The online traffic north of Toledo was insufficient to justify inclusion. The USRA was also skeptical of the potential profitability of any of the Lake Michigan train ferries.

In the end, none of the Ann Arbor main line was conveyed to Conrail on April 1, 1976. The bankrupt estate retained ownership of the line north of Cadillac to Frankfort and between Durand and Ann Arbor. The Grand Trunk Western Railway acquired the section between Durand and Ashley, Michigan. Finally, the state of Michigan bought the line between Ann Arbor and Toledo, and also between Cadillac and Ashley. The state leased the sections that it did not own outright, and contracted with Conrail to operate it under a mix of state and federal subsidies. The Grand Trunk Western promptly abandoned most the ex-Ann Arbor's parallel line between Durand and Owosso.

The Michigan Interstate Railway replaced Conrail as the designated operator on October 1, 1977. In June 1980 the state bought the Frankfort–Cadillac and Durand–Ann Arbor sections from the Ann Arbor estate. (Note: Meints includes Durand–Ann Arbor as part of the 1976 acquisition.) Train ferry service out of Frankfort ended in April 1982 amid a financial dispute between the Michigan Interstate Railway and the state. Beginning that October, the Michigan Interstate stopped operating north of Ann Arbor, and the state brought in two new operators: the Michigan Northern Railway for the line north of Alma, and the Tuscola and Saginaw Bay Railway for the line between Alma and Ann Arbor. The state sold the Ann Arbor–Toledo part of the line to the Michigan Interstate in 1985 as part of the settlement of the financial dispute.

The Tuscola and Saginaw Bay replaced the Michigan Northern north of Alma on October 1, 1984. In 1987 the Grand Trunk Western spun off 202 miles (325 km) of lines in Michigan to the Central Michigan Railway, a sister company of the Detroit and Mackinac Railway. These included the line between Owosso and Durand. At the same time, the state acquired the Grand Trunk Western's remaining 22 miles (35 km) between Ashley and Owosso. The shortline holding company RailAmerica acquired the Central Michigan Railway in 2004; the Huron and Eastern Railway, another RailAmerica property, subsequently acquired all of the Central Michigan Railway's track.

With the end of cross-Lake Michigan ferry service the line was effectively unused beyond Yuma. Nothing came of a proposal by a new company, the Elberta, Betsie River Valley and Michigan Railway, to resume service in the early 1990s. A proposal to convert the line between Frankfort and Thompsonville into a rail trail was stalled for years by litigation over property ownership around Crystal Lake. The lawsuit was settled in 1996, permitting the development of the Betsie Valley Trail.

== Passenger service ==
Scheduled passenger service on the line ended in 1950. In 1898, scheduled service amounted to one round-trip between Toledo and Frankfort and another between Toledo and Mount Pleasant. A journey over the full route took 11 hours. In Frankfort, connection was made with steamships serving Wisconsin and Michigan's Upper Peninsula.
