= City of Milwaukee =

City of Milwaukee may refer to:

- the city of Milwaukee, Wisconsin
- SS City of Milwaukee, a great lakes car ferry named for the city
