= Great Lakes Central Railroad =

Railway company in the United States of America

- Tuscola and Saginaw Bay Railway
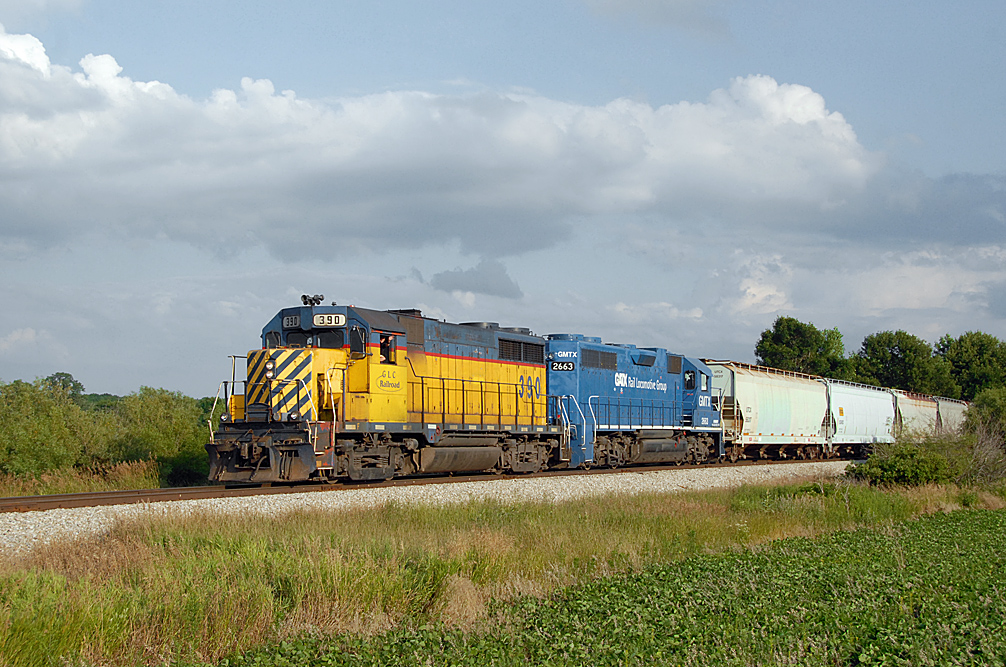
- A GLC GP35 heads north out of Alma; July 20, 2009

Overview
- Headquarters: Owosso, Michigan
- Reporting mark: GLC
- Locale: Michigan
- Dates of operation: 1977–present

Technical
- Track gauge: 4 ft 8 1/2 in (1,435 mm) standard gauge
- Length: 386.28 miles (621.66 km)

Other
- Website: www.glcrailroad.com

The Great Lakes Central Railroad (reporting mark GLC) is an American regional railroad operating in the state of Michigan. It was originally called the Tuscola and Saginaw Bay Railway (reporting mark TSBY), which was formed on August 26, 1977, to operate over former Penn Central lines from Millington to Munger, and from Vassar to Colling. TSBY's name was derived from the three counties it operated in: Tuscola, Saginaw and Bay.

== History ==
=== Tuscola and Saginaw Bay Railway (1977–2006) ===
The Tuscola and Saginaw Bay Railway was incorporated on April 26, 1977. It operated three lines under contract to the Michigan Department of Transportation (MDOT), succeeding Conrail: the Bay City branch between Millington, Michigan, and Munger, Michigan; the Caro branch between Vassar, Michigan, and Colling, Michigan; and the Saginaw branch between Vassar and Richville, Michigan. In 1981, it purchased 9.5 miles (15.3 km) of the Saginaw branch between Richville and Harger (near Saginaw, Michigan), from the Grand Trunk Western Railroad.

In October 1982, MDOT selected the TSBY to replace the Michigan Interstate Railway as the designated operator on two lines: the Ann Arbor Railroad main line between Ann Arbor and Alma, Michigan, and on the Saginaw branch between Owosso and Swan Creek, near Saginaw, Michigan. MDOT transferred the remainder of the ex-Ann Arbor main line from the Michigan Northern Railway to the TSBY in May 1984. MDOT transferred the remainder of the Michigan Northern's state-owned lines to the TSBY in October 1984:

- the former Grand Rapids and Indiana Railway main line between Reed City and Petoskey.
- the former GR&I Traverse City branch between Traverse City and Walton.
- the former Pere Marquette Railway between Grawn and Williamsburg via Traverse City.
- the former Pere Marquette between Charlevoix and Bay View near Petoskey.

In addition, the previous August TSBY acquired 12 miles (19 km) of the Greenville Subdivision, between Ashley and Middleton, from the Grand Trunk Western. Altogether, the TSBY owned 21.5 miles (34.6 km) of track and operated over a further 472.5 miles (760.4 km) at the end of 1984.

The contract for the line between Charlevoix and Bay View ended in 1988; the state abandoned the line in 1991. Train ferry service on the northern end of the former Ann Arbor line had ended in 1982, leaving the line out of service beyond Yuma. The Huron and Eastern Railway replaced TSBY as the designated operator on its original three lines around Vassar in 1991. At the same time, the TSBY sold the 9.5 miles (15.3 km) of the Saginaw branch between Richville and Harger to the Huron and Eastern. The state abandoned the former GR&I main line between Cadillac and Comstock Park in 1991. Also abandoned in 1991 was the Saginaw branch between Chesaning and St. Charles.

=== Great Lakes Central Railroad (2006–2025) ===
Federated Railways purchased the Tuscola and Saginaw Bay Railway in May 2006. The company was subsequently renamed the Great Lakes Central Railroad. Great Lakes Central Railroad is the largest shortline railroad in the state of Michigan covering 386.28 miles (621.66 km) of track.

Great Lakes Central Railroad (2025–present)

Watco announced plans to acquire the railroad on March 6, 2025, and in August of the same year, Watco fully acquired the Great Lakes Central Railroad.

== Current operations ==
Today the GLC operates former Ann Arbor Railroad track from Ann Arbor to Cadillac, former Pennsylvania Railroad track from Cadillac to Petoskey and Walton to Traverse City, former Chesapeake and Ohio Railway track from Grawn to Williamsburg, former New York Central Railroad track from Owosso to Fergus, and former Grand Trunk Western Railroad track from Ashley to Middleton. The GLC also operates a small portion of the abandoned CSX Ludington Subdivision in Clare, to serve a local plastics factory.

=== Interchanges ===
GLC interchanges with Class I railroads Canadian National in Durand and CSX at Howell, and shortlines Huron and Eastern Railway in Durand and Owosso, the Mid-Michigan Railroad in Alma and the Ann Arbor Railroad at Osmer.
