= Blaine Township, Michigan =

- Civil township
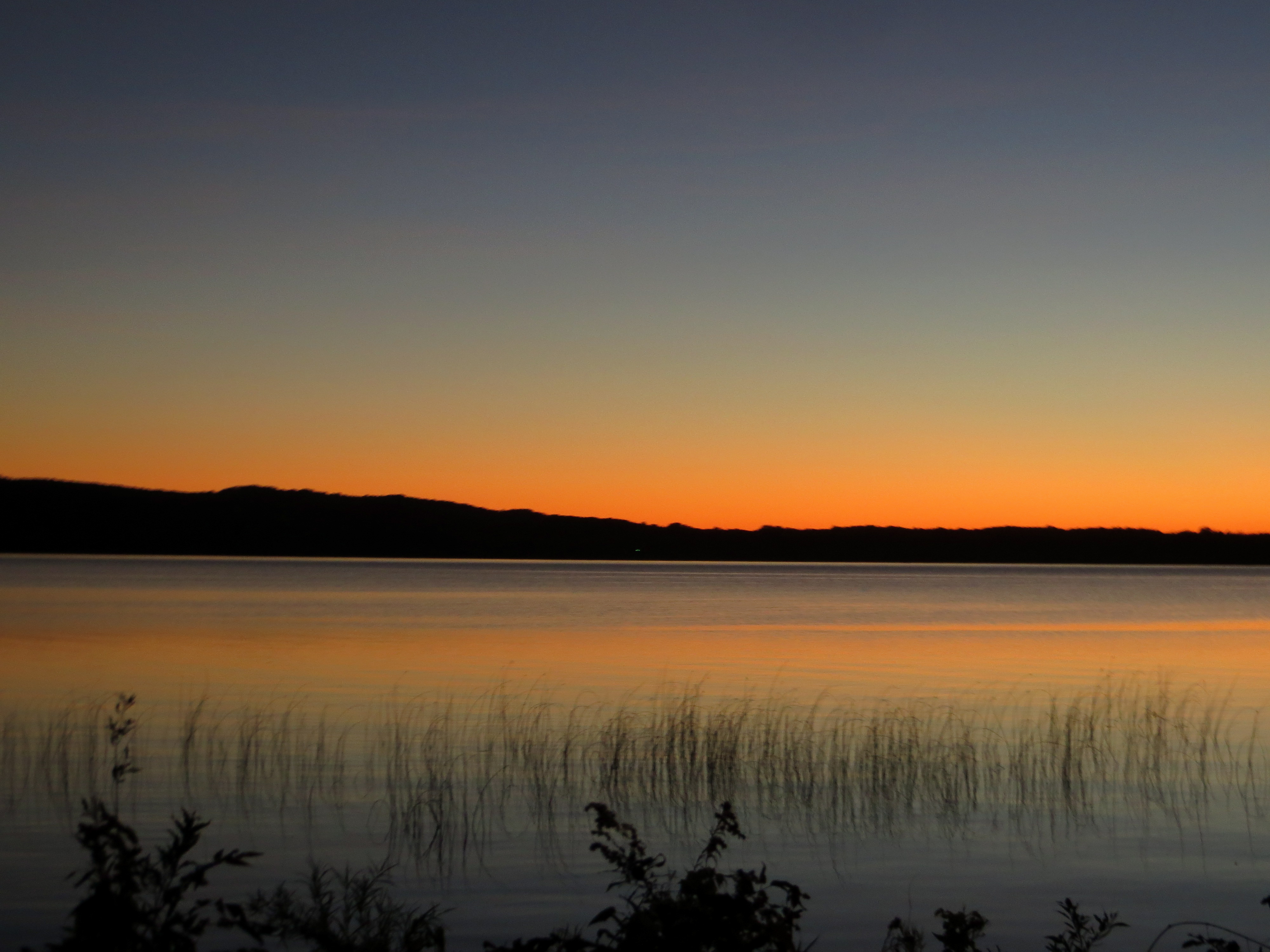
- Sunset over Upper Herring Lake

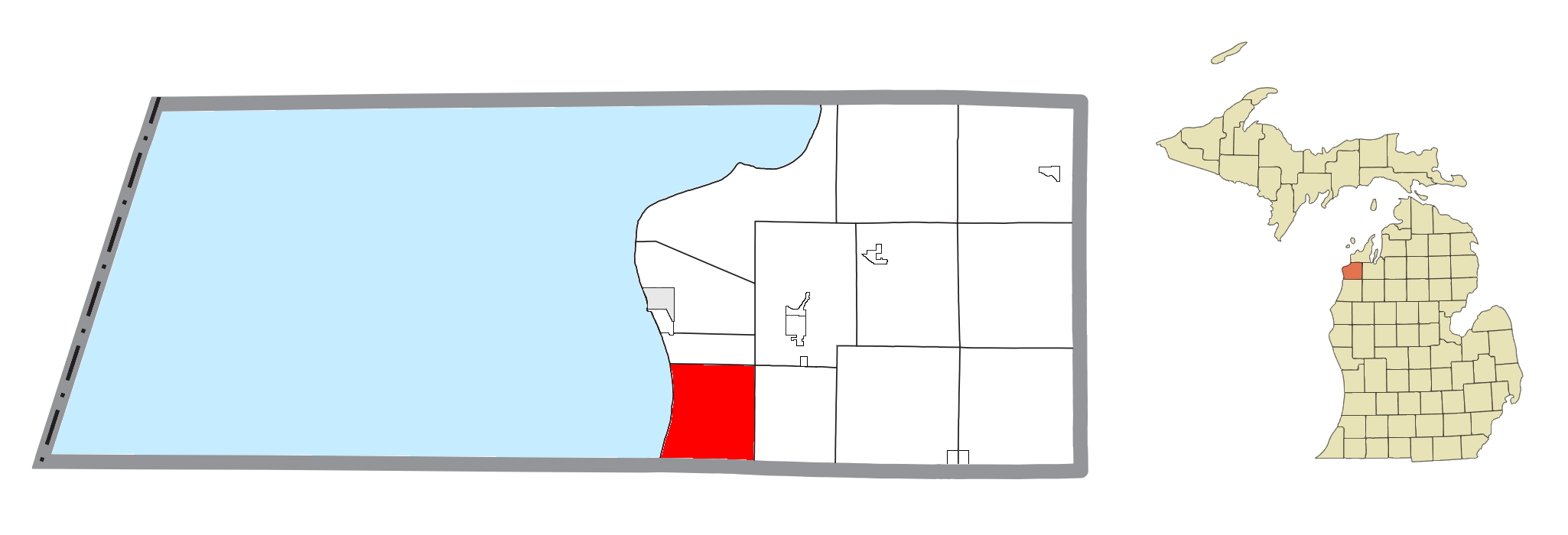
- Location within Benzie County

- Location within the state of Michigan Blaine Township (the United States)
- Coordinates: 44°33′45″N 86°11′37″W
- Country: United States
- State: Michigan
- County: Benzie

Area
  - Total: 21.0 sq mi (54.5 km^{2})
  - Land: 19.4 sq mi (50.3 km^{2})
  - Water: 1.6 sq mi (4.2 km^{2})
- Elevation: 653 ft (199 m)

Population (2020)
  - Total: 484
  - Density: 28/sq mi (10.9/km^{2})
- Time zone: UTC-5 (Eastern (EST))
  - Summer (DST): UTC-4 (EDT)
- ZIP code(s): 49628
- Area code: 231
- FIPS code: 26-08840
- GNIS feature ID: 1625944
- Website: https://www.blainetownship.net/

Arcadia Dunes

Blaine Township is a civil township of Benzie County in the U.S. state of Michigan. As of the 2020 census, the township population was 484. It is located in the southwest portion of the county. There are no significant population centers in the township; the nearest towns are Arcadia to the south, Benzonia to the northeast, and Elberta to the northwest. M-22 is the township's main thoroughfare.

== History ==
Blaine Township was organized from part of what had been Gilmore Township in 1876.

For a very brief period in the early 1890s, a town called Watervale 44°33′13″N 86°12′52″W was inhabited in the township along Lower Herring Lake. The town participated in the sawmill boom that brought a period of prosperity to northern Michigan. Abandoned in 1894, the town was made into a summer resort in 1917. Today the resort is known as the Inn at Watervale and the Watervale Historic District. Watervale maintains its nineteenth-century atmosphere and has been placed on the National Register of Historic Places.

== Geography ==
According to the United States Census Bureau, the township has a total area of 21.0 square miles (54.5 km^{2}), of which 19.4 square miles (50.3 km^{2}) is land and 1.6 square miles (4.2 km^{2}), or 7.70%, is water. It is bordered on the north by Gilmore Township, on the east by Joyfield Township, on the south by Arcadia and Pleasanton townships in Manistee County, and on the west by Lake Michigan. Besides Lake Michigan, the township's most distinguishing physical features are Lower and Upper Herring Lakes, connected and fed by Herring Creek, and bluffs at Green Point Dunes (north of the lakes) and Arcadia Dunes.

The township's economy is heavily agricultural, with apples and cherries two prominent crops. Fruit orchards dominate much of the landscape.

== Sites of interest ==
Blaine Township is home to two churches, Herring Lake Church (nondenominational) and Blaine Christian Church (Disciples of Christ). A gravity hill located at the site of Blaine Christian Church on Putney Road near its intersection with Joyfield Road is a well-known local landmark.

Since 1991 the Grand Traverse Regional Land Conservancy had maintained a nature preserve along Upper Herring Lake (the Upper Herring Nature Preserve). Just north of the township's southern border is Inspiration Point, a high headland overlooking Lake Michigan where a platform has been built atop the bluff. The point is a popular lookout and is a prominent stop along the scenic route of Highway 22. The Conservancy also maintains popular and scenic preserves at Green Point Dunes and Arcadia Dunes: The C.S. Mott Nature Preserve (partially within the township).

== Demographics ==
As of the census of 2000, there were 491 people, 215 households, and 153 families residing in the township. The population density was 25.3 inhabitants per square mile (9.8/km^{2}). There were 431 housing units at an average density of 22.2 per square mile (8.6/km^{2}). The racial makeup of the township was 98.98% White, 0.41% from other races, and 0.61% from two or more races. Hispanic or Latino of any race were 2.85% of the population.

There were 215 households, out of which 19.1% had children under the age of 18 living with them, 65.6% were married couples living together, 4.2% had a female householder with no husband present, and 28.4% were non-families. 23.3% of all households were made up of individuals, and 7.4% had someone living alone who was 65 years of age or older. The average household size was 2.26 and the average family size was 2.67.

In the township the population was spread out, with 19.6% under the age of 18, 4.1% from 18 to 24, 19.1% from 25 to 44, 35.6% from 45 to 64, and 21.6% who were 65 years of age or older. The median age was 50 years. For every 100 females, there were 108.1 males. For every 100 females age 18 and over, there were 106.8 males.

The median income for a household in the township was $42,500, and the median income for a family was $46,250. Males had a median income of $30,000 versus $23,750 for females. The per capita income for the township was $21,465. About 2.9% of families and 4.3% of the population were below the poverty line, including 6.6% of those under age 18 and none of those age 65 or over.
