= Dwight Boyer =

American historian (1912–1978)

Dwight Boyer (November 18, 1912 in Elyria, Ohio – October 15, 1978 in Willoughby, Ohio) was a reporter and marine historian of the Great Lakes. He wrote for The Blade (Toledo, Ohio) from 1944 to 1954, and for The Plain Dealer (Cleveland, Ohio) from 1954 to 1978.

Boyer specialized in feature-length narratives of life aboard Great Lakes lake freighters, often concentrating on stories of mystery and disaster. He published five volumes of stories about Great Lakes shipping, described by one source as being marked by a mixture of "technical data" and "engrossing narrative". He had many friends in the shipping trade and among the newsgatherers of the Great Lakes ports, and carefully weighed the information they gave him. He excelled in constructing a conjectural trajectory for the cargo vessels that disappeared in the great storms of the past, never being seen in again in their home port or any other harbor of refuge.

Dwight Boyer discussed the 1882 foundering of the SS Asia, the 1924 vanishing of the whaleback SS Clifton with all hands, the 1927 disappearance of the package freighter SS Kamloops, the 1929 foundering of the car ferry SS Milwaukee, and the 1942 sinking of the crewed barge Cleveco in Ghost Ships of the Great Lakes (1968), and retold an account of the 1975 disappearance of the SS Edmund Fitzgerald in his last book, Ships and Men of the Great Lakes (1977).

== Bibliography ==
- Great Stories of the Great Lakes (1966)
- Ghost Ships of the Great Lakes (1968)
- True Tales of the Great Lakes (1971)
- Strange Adventures of the Great Lakes (1974)
- Ships and Men of the Great Lakes (1977)
