= Upper Herring Lake =

Lake in Benzie County, Michigan

Coordinates: 44°33′37″N 86°10′52″W

Upper Herring Lake is a 540-acre lake located directly east of Watervale, Benzie County, Michigan, in the Lower Peninsula. Historically an estuary attached to Lake Michigan, shoreline changes resulted in the separation of the two lakes. The western shore is largely protected by the Upper Herring Lake Nature Preserve, which also shields parts of Lower Herring Lake. Upper Herring and Lower Herring are connected to each other through the Herring Creek System which was design to allow migratory fish to swim between destinations and Lake Michigan. The lake has a maximum depth of roughly 25 feet.

Like much of the county, the area around the lake was historically used by the Odawa, Ojibwe, and Potawatomi as seasonal hunting grounds. The area surrounding the lake was seeded to the United States in the 1836 Treaty of Washington. The lake is managed by the Upper Herring Lake Association (UHLA) and the Michigan Department of Natural Resources. The UHLA hosts a number of local festivals and evets at the two lakes.

The lake serves as a habitat for a number of fish species. Most notably, walleye are abundant in the lake after being originally stocked in 1987 while largemouth and smallmouth bass also maintain steady populations. The lake also supports trout and migratory fish including steelhead and coho salmon associated with the Herring Creek system.
