= Betsie Valley Trail =

Rail trail

Coordinates: 44°37′00″N 86°05′20″W

Betsie Valley Trail is a 22-mile (35 km) rail trail in Benzie County, Michigan, United States, owned by the Michigan Department of Natural Resources and operated by Benzie County.

It is on the trackbed of a former Ann Arbor Railroad line and extends from Frankfort to Thompsonville, via Elberta and Beulah.
