= Gilmore Township =

Gilmore Township may refer to:

- Gilmore Township, Benzie County, Michigan
- Gilmore Township, Isabella County, Michigan
- Gilmore Township, McHenry County, North Dakota, in McHenry County, North Dakota
- Gilmore Township, Pennsylvania
