= M-168 (Michigan highway) =

Former state highway in Elberta, Benzie County, Michigan, United States

M-168
- M-168 highlighted in red

Route information
- Maintained by MDOT
- Length: 0.953 mi (1,534 m)
- Existed: 1931–April 24, 2012

Major junctions
- East end: M-22 in Elberta
- West end: Former Ann Arbor Railroad ferry docks in Elberta

Location
- Country: United States
- State: Michigan
- Counties: Benzie

Highway system
- Michigan State Trunkline Highway System; Interstate; US; State; Byways
← M-158	→ M-171

M-168 was one of the shortest state trunkline highways in the US state of Michigan, extending just under a mile (1.6 km) from a junction with M-22 in downtown Elberta to the former Ann Arbor Railroad ferry docks. It followed the south shore of Lake Betsie (formed by the Betsie River before flowing into Lake Michigan). The highway was commissioned in 1931 and served as a connection to the car ferries until 1984. The road was reconstructed by the Michigan Department of Transportation (MDOT) in preparation to transfer it to village control. That transfer happened on April 24, 2012, and now the former highway is a village street.

== Route description ==
M-168 began at a junction with M-22 just west of where M-22 crosses over Lake Betsie. Known as Frankfort Avenue, M-168 then traveled to the northwest near the shore of the lake through a mixed residential and commercial area before turning slightly westward onto Furnace Avenue. Along Furnace Avenue, the roadway is lined with homes on one side and lake frontage on the other. Eventually, the road curves to the west where it intersects Betsie Valley Trail coming to its terminus shortly thereafter at the former Ann Arbor Railroad ferry docks.

== History ==
M-168 had existed in its current location since 1931. It was originally assumed into the state trunkline system at 0.8 miles (1.3 km) in length. Aside from a minor realignment of the junction with M-22 in 1987, the route had remained in this configuration since 1931. From its creation until 1984, the road was the main entrance for cars bound for boarding the car ferry.

An MDOT document indicated that in 2010, a $2.1 million project would reconstruct M-168. Upon completion of the project, the route would be jurisdictionally transferred to the Village of Elberta, thereby removing M-168 from the state trunkline system. This transfer was finalized on April 24, 2012, and afterwards, the former M-168 was reclassified a village street.

== Major intersections ==
The entire highway was in Elberta, Benzie County.

mi	km	Destinations	Notes
0.000	0.000	M-22 / LMCT – Manistee, Frankfort	
0.953	1.534	Former Ann Arbor Railroad ferry docks	
1.000 mi = 1.609 km; 1.000 km = 0.621 mi
