= Michigan Northern Railway =

Defunct railway in Michigan, United States

Overview
- Headquarters: Cadillac, Michigan
- Locale: Michigan
- Dates of operation: 1976–1986
- Successor: Tuscola and Saginaw Bay Railway

Technical
- Track gauge: 4 ft 8 1/2 in (1,435 mm) standard gauge

The Michigan Northern Railway (reporting mark MIGN) was a railroad that provided service to the northern part of the Lower Peninsula of Michigan from 1976 to 1986. At the beginning of service on April 1, 1976, the MIGN operated the former Grand Rapids and Indiana Railroad from Comstock Park to Mackinaw City and the Walton Junction Branch to Traverse City. In 1982, the MIGN assumed operation of the former Chesapeake and Ohio Railway from Grawn to Williamsburg and from Charlevoix to Petoskey, and the former Ann Arbor Railroad from Alma to Frankfort.

== History ==
The Michigan Northern Railway was established in December 1975 to operate the former Pennsylvania Railroad's Grand Rapids and Indiana Railroad from Comstock Park to Mackinaw City. As the Penn Central Transportation Company sought to abandon railroad lines in northern Michigan, the Michigan Department of Transportation arranged subsidies for the MIGN to acquire the segment from Comstock Park to Mackinaw City. Operations began on April 1, 1976. At Mackinaw City, the MIGN interchanged with the Detroit and Mackinac Railway. The DM switched cars onto the SS Chief Wawatam, a railroad ferry that provided service across the Straits of Mackinac from Mackinaw City to St. Ignace. This enabled the MIGN to offer through freight service to the Upper Peninsula. Due to a controversial rate "flag-out" that began in 1978, the MIGN saw increased overhead car counts. In 1977, the MIGN handled 568 overhead cars while in 1978, the MIGN handled 4781 overhead cars. After nationwide railroad deregulation in 1980, the overhead car counts reduced considerably. In February 1982, the Michigan Department of Transportation purchased two segments of the former Chesapeake and Ohio Railway intended for abandonment. The MIGN was contracted to operate from Grawn to Williamsburg via connection with the Walton Junction Branch in Traverse City and from Charelvoix to its existing route in Petoskey. Additionally, on October 1, 1982, the MIGN assumed operations of the former Ann Arbor Railroad main line from Alma to Frankfort.

In May 1984, due to poor accounting and operating practices, the Michigan Department of Transportation withdrew subsidies from the MIGN; operations on the state owned railroad lines were transferred to the Tuscola and Saginaw Bay Railway. Service south of Reed City to Comstock Park was discontinued. At this time, only the segment from Petoskey to Mackinaw City was operated by the MIGN. Following Penn Central's departure from ferry services and unsuccessful attempts to operate regular excursion trains, the MIGN abandoned the railroad line from Pellston to Mackinaw City. A "truck-to-rail" transfer facility was established in Pellston to handle steel products from Algoma Steel in Sault Ste. Marie. This constituted the MIGN's sole source of revenue at the time with the only exception being the odd excursion train. However, in January 1986, after claims the MIGN had been delinquent on payments to Penn Central for the remaining railroad line, a federal judge granted the MIGN a six-month grace period to make a payment of $150,000 to the Penn Central. Despite this, the MIGN was unable to make payment due to limited revenue and the railroad line was removed in June 1987.
