= Ann Arbor Railroad (1988) =

Railroad in Michigan and Ohio

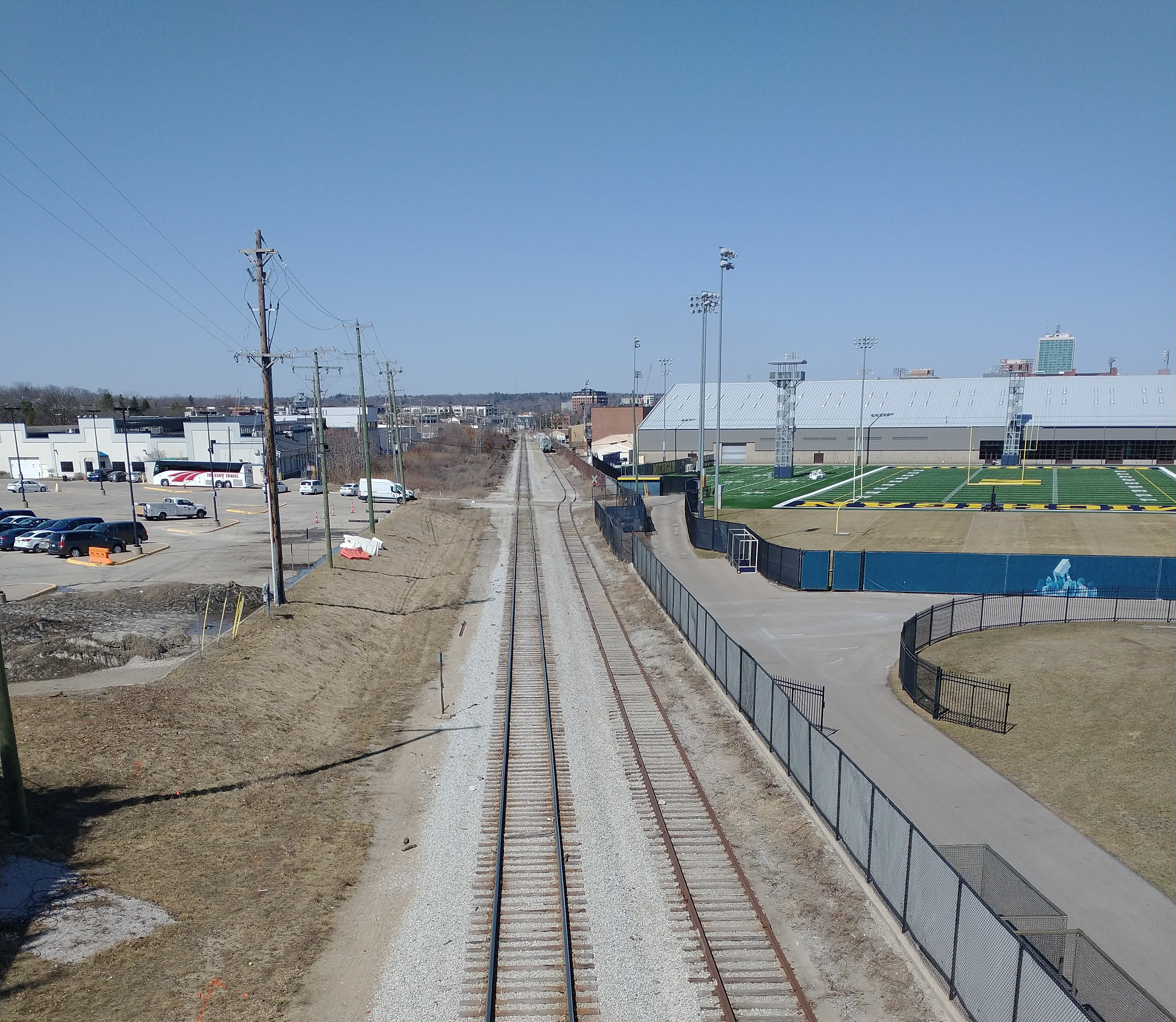
- Tracks of the Ann Arbor Railroad in downtown Ann Arbor, Michigan

Overview
- Headquarters: Howell, Michigan
- Reporting mark: AA
- Locale: Michigan and Ohio
- Dates of operation: 1988–Present
- Predecessor: Michigan Interstate Railway

Technical
- Length: 47 miles (76 km)

The Ann Arbor Railroad (reporting mark AA) is a Class III railroad that operates fifty miles of track from Toledo, Ohio, to Ann Arbor, Michigan. The railroad is operated by Watco and is based in Howell, Michigan. Prior to Watco's purchase of the railroad in 2013, the railroad was operated by the Ann Arbor Acquisition Corporation from 1988 to 2013.

== History ==
Conrail served as the designated operator of the Ann Arbor Railroad main line from 1976–1977 following the bankruptcy of the original Ann Arbor Railroad. The Michigan Interstate Railway succeeded Conrail in 1977 and purchased the Toledo–Ann Arbor portion of the line from the state of Michigan in 1985. The Ann Arbor Acquisition Corporation, doing business as the Ann Arbor Railroad, purchased the bankrupt Michigan Interstate Railway on October 7, 1988.

== Operations ==
The Ann Arbor Railroad operates 47 route miles (76 km) between Ottawa Yard in Toledo, Ohio and Ann Arbor, Michigan. In Toledo it interchanges with the Canadian National Railway, CSX, the Norfolk Southern Railway, and the Wheeling and Lake Erie Railway. It has additional interchange points with the Indiana and Ohio Railway in Diann, Michigan; the Norfolk Southern in Milan, Michigan; and the Great Lakes Central Railroad in Osmer, Michigan, just north of Ann Arbor.
