= Grand Trunk Milwaukee Car Ferry Company =

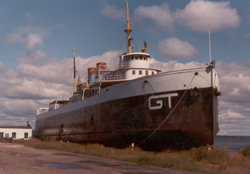
SS Grand Rapids out of service 1980.

The Grand Trunk Milwaukee Car Ferry Company was the Grand Trunk Western Railroad's subsidiary company operating its Lake Michigan railroad car ferry operations between Muskegon, Michigan, and Milwaukee, Wisconsin, from 1905 to 1978. Major railroad companies in Michigan used rail ferry vessels to transport rail cars across Lake Michigan from Michigan's western shore to eastern Wisconsin to avoid rail traffic congestion in Chicago.

== History ==
The Montreal-based Grand Trunk Railway of Canada's entry into car ferry operations started by signing an operating agreement with the Crosby Transportation Company which established the Grand Trunk Car Ferry Line. The new line began building docking slips in Milwaukee, Wisconsin and Grand Haven, Michigan. The first ferry was the SS Grand Haven built in 1903 by the Craig Shipbuilding Company of Toledo, Ohio. The Grand Trunk Car Ferry Line dissolved in 1905 when it defaulted on bonds.

Grand Trunk would form its new subsidiary company, the Grand Trunk Milwaukee Car Ferry Company, to take over its Lake Michigan car ferry operations. The new company was incorporated in Milwaukee on November 10, 1905, and would acquire the SS Grand Haven from its receivers. In 1933, Grand Trunk Western decided to move its Michigan docks from Grand Haven to Muskegon, Michigan. The Muskegon Rail & Navigation Co. would build and operate the rail terminal operations in Muskegon. The Grand Haven dock slip would be reserved for auxiliary or emergency use.

In 1903 Grand Trunk Western was the last of the three Michigan railroads to start Lake Michigan ferry operations, the Ann Arbor Railroad and Pere Marquette Railway began their ferry service prior to 1900. One of GTW's predecessor lines the Detroit Grand Haven & Milwaukee Railway had completed building trackage to Grand Haven in 1858 and started a break-bulk service across Lake Michigan in the 1890s.

The Grand Trunk Milwaukee Car Ferry Co. would exchange GTW's rail traffic in Milwaukee with the Chicago and North Western Railway, Milwaukee Road, and Wisconsin Central Railway.

By the 1970s the ferry service became cost prohibitive and Grand Trunk Western applied to the ICC in 1975 to abandon its car ferry service. Permission was granted three years later and in 1978 Grand Trunk Milwaukee Car Ferry Co. ended operations.

== Ships ==
The original ship, the Grand Haven, was sold, by its receivers, to the Grand Trunk Milwaukee Car Ferry Company in 1905. In 1908 the car ferry company bought the ferry Manistique, Marquette & Northern No. 1 and renamed it SS Milwaukee. In the mid-1920s, the two ships were augmented by chartering ferries from the Pere Marquette and Ann Arbor lines. In 1926, the Grand Rapids was built in Manitowoc, Wisconsin. The ship was similar to Pere Marquette Railway's car ferries the Pere Marquette No.21 and Pere Marquette No.22 and the Ann Arbor Railroad's Ann Arbor No 7. Another ship, the Madison was built in Manitowoc in 1927.

On October 22, 1929, the ferry SS Milwaukee sank. Two days later its wreckage was discovered near Racine, Wisconsin. The United States Coast Guard near South Haven, Michigan found the ship's purser's message canister with a written note. The ship was replaced by a new ferry named City of Milwaukee built in 1931

The ships also had 16 cabins for passenger service. By 1970, the Grand Trunk Western car ferries were no longer carrying passengers, as they could no longer meet Coast Guard safety regulations for passenger ships. (The wood paneling in the staterooms constituted a fire hazard). They also were much slower and not nearly as luxurious as the Chesapeake & Ohio boats (the SS Badger, et al.) which were sailing from Milwaukee to Ludington, Michigan at the time.

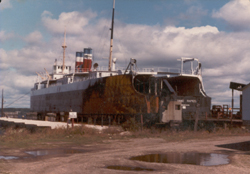
SS Grand Rapids awaiting disposition 1980

=== Car Ferry Fleet ===
- SS Grand Haven, built 1903 at Toledo, Ohio by Craig Shipbuilding Company; sold in 1946 to operating between Florida and Cuba, but returned sail in Lake Erie in the 1960s and partially sank in the Cuyahoga River in Cleveland, Ohio in 1969; scrapped in Hamilton, Ontario around 1970
- SS Milwaukee, formerly Manistique, Marquette & Northern 1, built 1902 at Cleveland, Ohio by American Ship Building Company (Sank near Milwaukee, Wisconsin 1929)
- SS Grand Rapids, built 1926 in Manitowoc, Wisconsin by Manitowoc Shipbuilding Company; ceased operating in 1970, damaged by fires in 1980 and 1987 in Muskegon, towed out of Muskegon for scrapping in 1989
- SS Madison, built 1927 in Manitowoc, Wisconsin by Manitowoc Shipbuilding Company Out of service in 1976, it was towed to Muskegon in 1988 and finally towed for scrapping in Port Colborne, Ontario in 1989.
- SS City of Milwaukee, built 1931 in Manitowoc, Wisconsin by Manitowoc Shipbuilding Company; currently docked in Manistee, Michigan
