= Watervale, Michigan =

- Watervale Historic District
- U.S. National Register of Historic Places
- U.S. Historic district
- Michigan State Historic Site
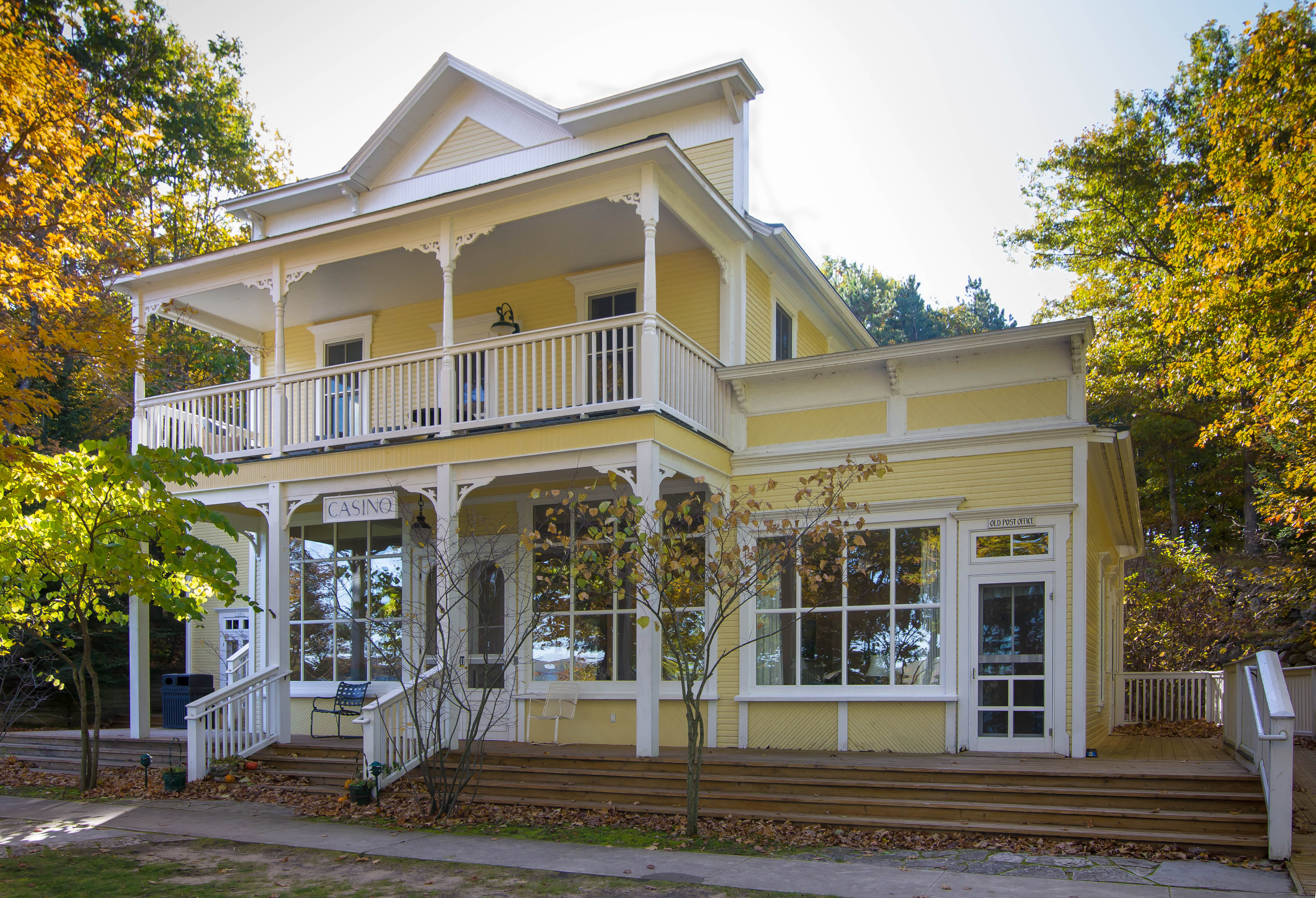
- Watervale historic Casino and Post Office, 2018

- Location within Michigan Location within the United States
- Interactive map
- Location: 975-1422 Watervale Rd., Blaine Township, Michigan
- Coordinates: 44°33′14″N 86°13′4″W
- Area: 25.5 acres (10.3 ha)
- Built: 1892
- Architectural style: Late Victorian, Bungalow/craftsman
- NRHP reference No.: 03000624

Significant dates
- Added to NRHP: July 10, 2003
- Designated MSHS: December 19, 1991

The Watervale Historic District is a resort, originally constructed as a lumber camp, located at 975-1422 Watervale Road on the shore of Lower Herring Lake in Blaine Township, Michigan. It was designated a Michigan State Historic Site in 1991 and listed on the National Register of Historic Places in 2003.

== History ==
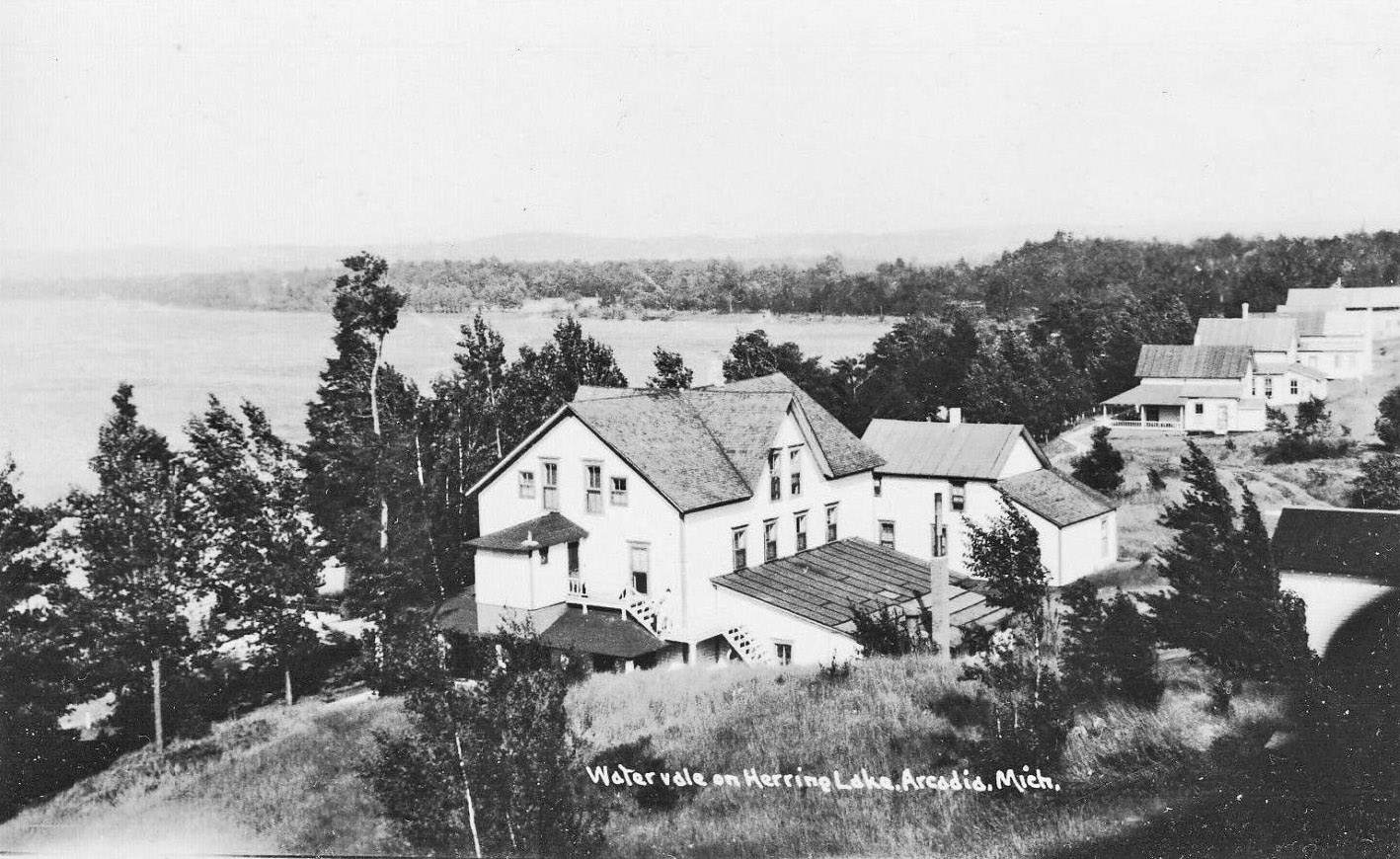
Watervale, c.1950

Leo F. Hale began a logging and shipping operation in this area in the early 1890s. In 1893, Hale, along with William and Mary Vincent, platted out the village of Watervale on the south shore of Lower Herring Lake. They built about 20 houses, many of which were shacks. There were, however, at least eight painted frame houses. The village also contained a meat market, general store, and post office.

As the logging boom waned, Hale went bankrupt, and by 1900 had lost most of Watervale; it was eventually nearly abandoned. In 1917, Dr. Oscar H. Kraft of Chicago purchased the town and adjacent land to use as a resort for his family. He restored several buildings, and opened it that summer as a public resort. Kraft's niece, Vera Noble, and her husband Vernon purchased the resort in 1960; Vera ran Watervale until her death in 2005, when it was passed on to her children.

== Description ==
The Watervale Historic District contains 16 buildings constructed between 1892 and 1927 sited along Watervale Road. The buildings include the former general store, a former boarding house now used as an inn, an assortment one- and two-story clapboard-covered houses and several early 20th century cottages.
