= Cleveco =

Barge sunk in Lake Erie

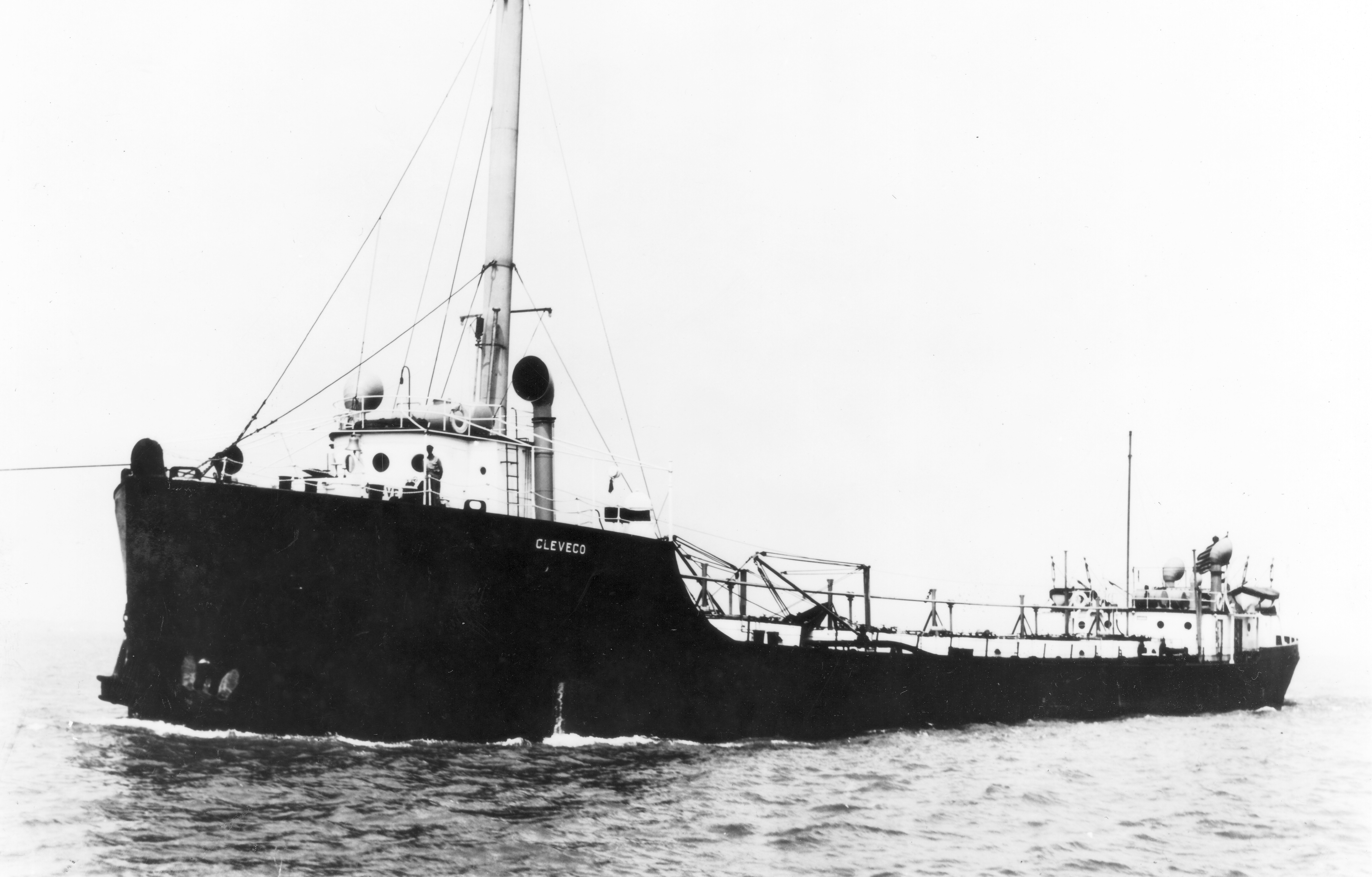

History

United States
- Name: Cleveco
- Operator: Cleveland Tankers, Inc.
- Builder: American Shipbuilding Company
- Completed: 1913
- In service: 1913
- Out of service: 1942
- Fate: Foundered off Euclid, Ohio, December 2, 1942

General characteristics
- Type: Tanker barge
- Tonnage: 2,441
- Length: 260 ft (79 m)
- Beam: 43 ft (13 m)
- Draft: 25 ft (7.6 m)
- Propulsion: Pulled by dedicated tugboat
- Capacity: 30,000 bbl (4,800 m^{3})
- Crew: 18

Cleveco was a crewed barge that was constructed in 1913 by the American Shipbuilding Company of Lorain, Ohio, to carry crude oil and refined petroleum products that had been pumped or refined in locations adjacent to Lake Erie, particularly northwest Ohio. The barge operated in this service for 29 years, in 1913–1942, under a variety of ship's names, until it sank on December 2, 1942. The tragedy caused the deaths of all 18 officers and crew members aboard.

== Sinking ==
In early December 1942, Cleveco was working within the intense duties of the overall World War II war effort. Loaded with fuel oil, the barge left Toledo, Ohio, on December 1 to proceed to the home port of Cleveland. Cleveco and the dedicated tug pulling the barge, Admiral, with a crew of 14, passed through the Pelee Passage in western Lake Erie, facing worsening gale conditions.

In the predawn morning hours of December 2, only a few miles from safety, the Cleveco discovered that its tug had suddenly sunk with all hands. The oil barge's towing cable was now an anchor in Lake Erie. The captain of the Cleveco made radio contact with the Ohio mainland, reported the disaster, and asked for assistance. Search planes and the United States Coast Guard responded, and both made brief visual contact with the barge, but were unable to maintain these contacts. Furthermore, the Coast Guard cutter was not able to rescue the barge's personnel within the conditions created by the storm, which included a harsh west wind and lake effect snow.

The Coast Guard's dilemma may have been worsened by the drifting status of the Cleveco during the attempted rescue hours of the December 2 daylight. The personnel of the crewed barge had apparently cut the towing cable. Brief radio communications continued in the now-lethal conditions of winter Lake Erie, but they did not convey much information about conditions aboard the Cleveco except that the barge was taking on water and was about to sink. The vessel then disappeared.

By December 3, wreckage of the Cleveco, including the bodies of about half of the crew, were floating off Euclid, Ohio, near Cleveland. Owner Cleveland Tankers was judged partly liable to the heirs of the barge's officers and crew for the loss of lives, as the tug and barge had been proved to be unseaworthy within the conditions experienced on December 2, 1942.

Loaded with leaking fuel oil, the sunken hulk of the Cleveco had become a toxic waste site. After many delays, a partly successful salvage operation in 1961 raised the capsized hulk and pumped out some of the oil. The hulk was then re-sunk off Cleveland, with at least 165,000 gallons of fuel oil remaining aboard. A second salvage operation in 1995 removed almost all of the remaining fuel oil, and conducted an underwater operation to seal its tanks from further leakage. The Cleveco is now accessible to experienced scuba divers.
