= SS City of Milwaukee =

Great Lakes railroad car ferry

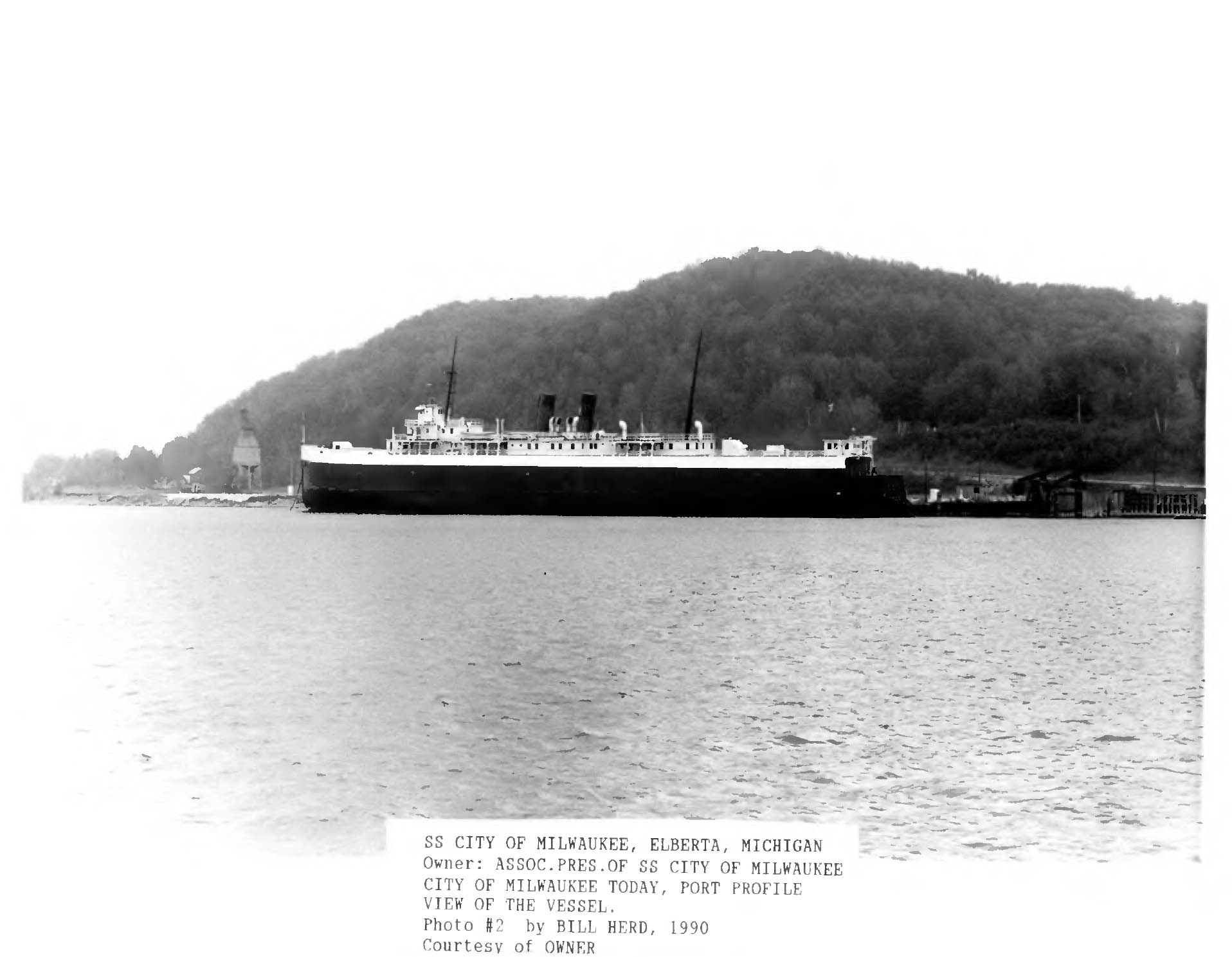
- SS City of Milwaukee at Elberta, Michigan in 1990

History

United States
- Name: SS City of Milwaukee
- Namesake: Milwaukee, WI
- Owner: Society for the Preservation of the SS City of Milwaukee
- Operator: Grand Trunk Milwaukee Car Ferry Company, (1931–1978); Ann Arbor Railroad (1978–1982)
- Route: Muskegon-Milwaukee; Elberta(Frankfort)-Kewaunee/Manitowoc
- Builder: Manitowoc Shipbuilding Company
- Yard number: Hull number 261
- Launched: November 25, 1930
- Christened: November 25, 1930
- Completed: January 15, 1931
- Out of service: August 9, 1981
- Identification: Official No. 230448; IMO number: 5073909
- Status: Museum ship

General characteristics
- Class & type: Railroad car ferry
- Tonnage: 2942
- Length: 354 ft (107.9 m) (LPP)
- Beam: 56 ft (17.1 m)
- Installed power: Steam
- Propulsion: Two triple-expansion steam engines
- Speed: 14.5 knots (26.9 km/h)
- Capacity: 30-32 rail cars
- Crew: 52
- City of Milwaukee (Great Lakes Car Ferry)
- U.S. National Register of Historic Places
- U.S. National Historic Landmark
- Location within Michigan
- Location: Manistee, Michigan
- Coordinates: 44°15′34″N 86°18′54″W
- NRHP reference No.: 90002221

Significant dates
- Added to NRHP: 14 December 1990
- Designated NHL: 14 December 1990

SS City of Milwaukee is a Great Lakes railroad car ferry that once plied Lake Michigan, often between Muskegon, Michigan and Milwaukee, Wisconsin. She was built in 1931 for the Grand Trunk Milwaukee Car Ferry Company and is the only pre-1940s ship of this type to survive. She now serves as a museum ship, bed and breakfast, and event venue on the waterfront of Manistee Lake in Manistee, Michigan. She was designated a National Historic Landmark in 1990.

== Description ==
The City of Milwaukee is a steel-hulled ship with a carrying capacity of 28–30 fully loaded rail cars. She was powered by four Scotch marine boilers, producing 185 psi (1,280 kPa) of pressure. The boilers were fueled by coal until 1947, when the COM was converted to No.5 (Bunker C) fuel oil, and was routinely topped off with 1,200 US gallons (4,500 L) of it. Two of the four boilers powered the two triple-expansion reciprocating steam engines rated at 1,350 horsepower (1,010 kW) each, for a combined horsepower of 2,700 hp (2,000 kW), while the third powered the generator and other steam-powered equipment on board, and the fourth would stay idle, switching off with the others. The two engines drove the twin cast-steel 4-bladed propellers; each at 12 ft (3.7 m) in diameter and over 10,000 pounds (4,500 kg). She has a relatively shallow draft, determined in part because ships carrying railroad vehicles needed to have a flat deck. The hull is divided into eight compartments. Listed in order from bow to stern is the chain locker, hold No.1, hold No.2, boiler room, engine room, flicker (crew quarters), shaft alley and lastly the steering engine room. The car deck is mostly covered and sheltered on the sides by the hull. There are four pairs of rails, with extra rails outside each pair to which the cars being carried were anchored by chains. The engineering and galley crew quarters, galley, passenger dining room, crew mess, and passenger staterooms are located on the deck directly above the cardeck. The deck above the passenger deck is the texas deck, which housed the captain's and mate's quarters, as well as some lookouts and watchmen. Above the texas deck is the pilot house, where main navigation of the vessel took place. There is also a small pilot house on the stern that is used for docking the vessel.

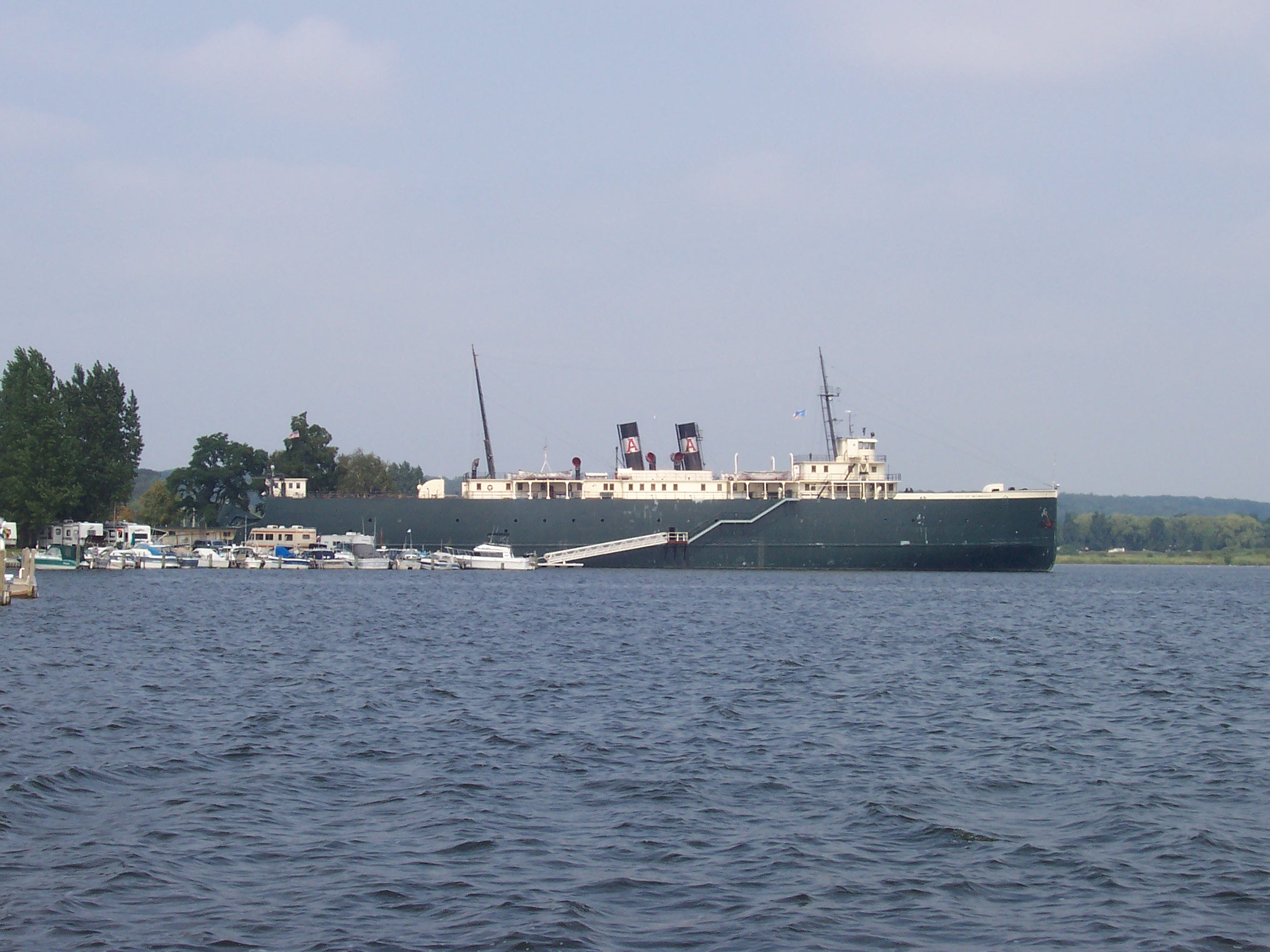
City of Milwaukee at berth in Manistee

The ship was built in 1930 and launched in 1931 at Manitowoc, Wisconsin to replace SS Milwaukee, which sank with all hands on October 22, 1929, during a gale. Car ferry service had been introduced to the Great Lakes in 1892, and there were many as 14 vessels operating on the lakes at the system's peak. These specialized vessels were capable of carrying up to 34 railroad cars across the often stormy and ice-packed lakes at any time of year. City of Milwaukee sailed for the Grand Trunk until 1978 when, as the last of their fleet of three to be sailing, she was chartered to the Ann Arbor Railroad. She sailed for this road until 1982, when she was retired permanently. She is currently preserved in Manistee, Michigan as a National Historic Landmark Museum, owned by the Society for the Preservation of the S.S. City of Milwaukee, a non-profit organization. In addition to being a museum to tour, she is also operated seasonally as a bed and breakfast, and every October she is transformed into Manistee's Ghost Ship, where nearly the entire ship is turned into a haunted attraction in order to raise funds. She is the last unmodified traditional railroad car ferry afloat upon the lakes, still with her triple expansion steam engine, original woodwork and brass fixtures.

== See also ==
- List of National Historic Landmarks in Michigan
- National Register of Historic Places listings in Manistee County, Michigan
