= EMD GP35 =

4-axle diesel-electric locomotive built by General Motors Electro-Motive Division

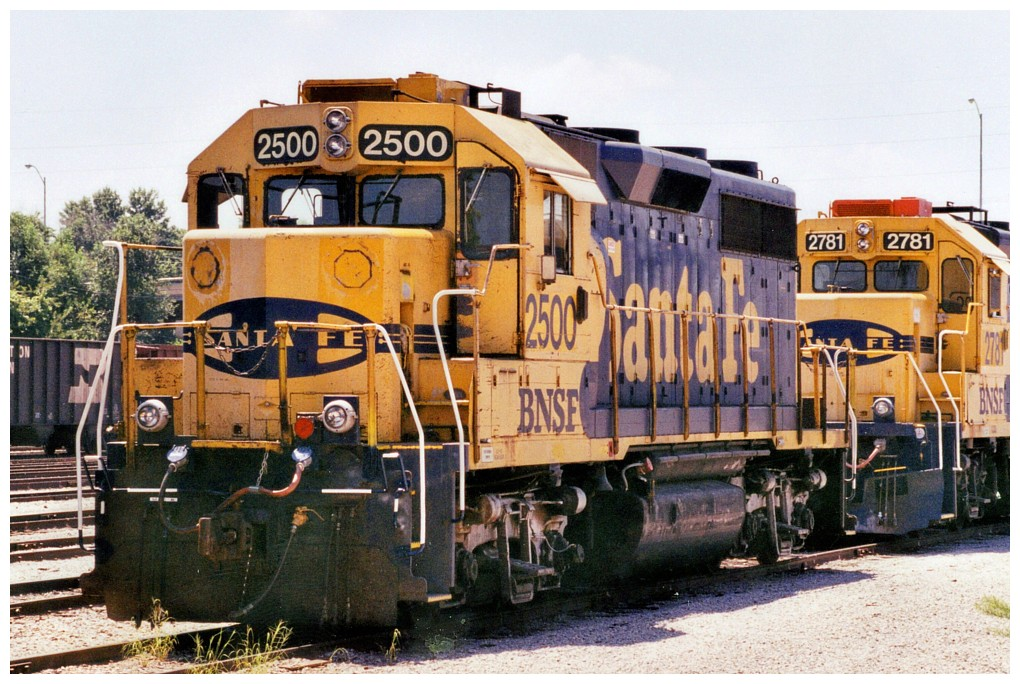
- BNSF #2500
Type and origin
- Power type: Diesel-electric
- Builder: General Motors Electro-Motive Division (EMD), General Motors Diesel, Canada (GMD)
- Model: GP35
- Build date: July 1963 – January 1966
- Total produced: 1,334
Specifications
- Configuration
  - AAR: B-B
  - UIC: Bo'Bo'
- Gauge: 4 ft 8 1/2 in (1,435 mm) standard gauge
- Wheel diameter: 40 in (1.016 m)
- Wheelbase: 9 ft (2.743 m)
- Length: 56 ft 2 in (17.12 m)
- Width: 10 ft 4 in (3.15 m)
- Height: 15 ft 3 in (4.65 m)
- Loco weight: 260,000 lb (117,934 kg)
- Prime mover: EMD 16-567D3A
- Engine type: V16 diesel
- Generator: EMD D-32
- Traction motors: EMD D67B (4)
- Cylinders: 16
Performance figures
- Maximum speed: 65 mph (105 km/h)
- Power output: 2,500 hp (1.86 MW)
- Tractive effort: Starting: 60,500 lbf (27,442 kgf) @25% Continuous: 50,000 lbf (22,680 kgf) @9.3 mph (15 km/h)
Career
- Locale: North America

The EMD GP35 is a 4-axle diesel-electric locomotive built by General Motors Electro-Motive Division between July 1963 and December 1965 and by General Motors Diesel between May 1964 and January 1966. 1251 examples were built for American railroads, 26 were built for Canadian railroads and 57 were built for Mexican railroads. Power was provided by a turbocharged EMD 567D3A 16-cylinder engine which generated 2,500 horsepower (1,860 kW).

Many railroads traded in Alco FA units and EMD F-units for GP35s, reusing the trucks and traction motors. Examples with Alco trucks include those owned by Gulf, Mobile and Ohio, Southern Railway, and Ann Arbor Railroad.

== Original buyers ==
Railroad	Quantity	Road numbers	Notes
Alaska Railroad	3	2501–2503	
Ann Arbor Railroad	10	385–394	Type B Trucks
Atchison, Topeka and Santa Fe Railway	161	1300–1460	Renumbered 3300-3460. Most now in service with BNSF Railway, 2505 was wrecked and retired in 2007.
Atlantic Coast Line Railroad	6	909–914	To Seaboard Coast Line 1400-1405
Baltimore and Ohio Railroad	41	3500–3519, 3540–3559, 3581	
Canadian National Railway	2	4000–4001	Renumbered 9300, 9301
Canadian Pacific Railway	24	8202–8213, 5014–5025	8202–8213 renumbered to 5002–5013, 5024–5025 last GP35s built
Chesapeake and Ohio Railway	42	3520–3539, 3560–3575	
Chesapeake and Ohio Railway	42	3045, 3047	Rebuilt from wrecked GP30s; Renumbered 3583,3584
Chesapeake and Ohio Railway	42	3537 (2nd), 3563 (2nd), 3574 (2nd)	Rebuilt from wrecked GP35s
Chesapeake and Ohio Railway	42	3582	Rebuilt from wrecked GP7
Chicago, Burlington and Quincy Railroad	22	978–999	To Burlington Northern 2524-2545
Chicago and Eastern Illinois Railroad	31	242–259	To Missouri Pacific Railroad 650–667
Chicago and Eastern Illinois Railroad	31	260–272	To Missouri Pacific Railroad 668–680, Louisville and Nashville Railroad 1116–1128
Chicago, Milwaukee, St. Paul and Pacific Railroad	12	360–371	Renumbered 1500–1511
Chicago and North Western Railway	43	824–866	824 and 825 were replacements for wrecked GP9s
Chicago, Rock Island and Pacific Railroad	34	300–333	
De Queen and Eastern Railroad	1	D-6	
Denver and Rio Grande Western Railroad	22	3029–3050	
Detroit, Toledo and Ironton Railroad	8	350–357	
Erie Lackawanna Railroad	36	2551–2586	To Conrail 3657-3692
Great Northern Railway	24	3017–3040	To Burlington Northern 2500-2523
Gulf, Mobile and Ohio Railroad	48	601–648	Type B trucks
Louisville and Nashville Railroad	17	1100–1115, 1101 (2nd)	1101 (2nd) wreck rebuild
Missouri Pacific Railroad	50	600–614, 640–649	From Texas and Pacific Railway
Missouri Pacific Railroad	50	615–639	
Ferrocarriles Nacionales de México	55	8200–8254	8215–8229 High Short Hood with steam generator
New York, Chicago and St. Louis Railroad	1	910	Rebuild of wrecked GP9. To N&W 2910
New York Central Railroad	31	6125–6155	Renumbered 2369–2399; numbers retained under Penn Central and Conrail. NYC 6155 was ex-EMD 1964 the New York World's Fair unit, exx EMD 5661
Norfolk and Western Railway	69	200–239, 1309–1328	
Norfolk and Western Railway	69	1300–1301	Low nose, ordered by Pittsburgh and West Virginia Railway
Norfolk and Western Railway	69	1302–1308	Low nose, ordered by Wabash Railroad
Pennsylvania Railroad	119	2252–2370	2309–2310 renumbered 2250–2251, and 2369–2370 renumbered 2309–2310; numbers retained under Penn Central and Conrail; 5 units to Housatonic Railroad 3600-3604
Reading Company	37	6501–6506, 3626–3656	6501–6506 renumbered 3620–3625; entire group to Conrail as 3620-3656
Richmond, Fredericksburg and Potomac Railroad	8	111–118	Renumbered 131–138
Seaboard Air Line Railroad	10	535–544	To Seaboard Coast Line 1406-1415
Ferrocarril Sonora–Baja California	2	2307–2308	
St. Louis – San Francisco Railway	33	700–732	725–731 Type B Trucks
Soo Line Railroad	10	722–731	722 only Type B Trucks
Southern Railway	78	210–214	From Central of Georgia Railway, renumbered to 240–244, to NS
Southern Railway	78	2645–2704, 2526	2526 Rebuilt from wrecked GP30, 2645–2702 Type B Trucks
Southern Railway	78	2705–2715	From Savannah and Atlanta Railway Company Type B Trucks
Southern Railway	78	2641	From CNO&TP, rebuilt from wrecked GP30
Southern Pacific Company	160	7408–7484, 7700–7782	Renumbered 6520–6679
St. Louis Southwestern Railway	22	760–781	Renumbered 6500–6519; 780–781 diverted from Southern Pacific Company, renumbered 6680–6681
Toledo, Peoria and Western Railway	3	900–902	Type B trucks
Union Pacific Railroad	24	740–763	UP 762–763 were ex EMD 5652, 5654 first GP35s built as part of the GP35–DD35–DD35–GP35 demonstrator set.
Wabash Railroad	8	540–547	To Norfolk and Western 3540-3547
Western Maryland Railway	5	501–505	Renumbered 3576–3580
Western Pacific Railroad	22	3001–3022	
Totals	1,334		

== Preservation ==
Some GP35s are in preservation, while others are on tourist railroads, meaning they are technically preserved.

- Conway Scenic Railroad 216 regularly operates with GP38 252 on the notch train, painted in a Maine Central inspired scheme with Conway Scenic reporting marks. It was built as Norfolk and Western 1328 and was their last GP35 built. It was sold to Springfield Terminal in 1992 and renumbered to 216. It was retired and sold to Conway Scenic in 2011.
- Fillmore and Western Railway 3501 and 3502 operated in year round excursion service, and sometimes appeared in films, TV shows and commercials. 3501 and 3502 were built as Pennsylvania Railroad 2262 and 2339. 3501 was sold to SMV when the Fillmore & Western Railway ceased operations in 2021 and 3502 remains on FWRY property.
- Gulf Mobile and Ohio 631 is stored at the Southern Appalachia Railway Museum. It was restored and put on display in Mobile, AL in 1997, then moved for restoration in 2008.
- Reading Company 3640 is under restoration at the Reading Company Technical and Historical Society in Hamburg, Pennsylvania. It was the only Reading GP35 to be painted in the solid green scheme in 1974, and the society hopes to restore it to this scheme.
- Savannah and Atlanta Railway 2715 is on display at the Georgia State Railroad Museum. It was the last GP35 built for any part of Southern Railway.
- Southern Railway 2641 is on display at the former station in Clarksville, Tennessee painted for the unit's last operator before display as R.J. Corman 3501.
- Watco 3533 is in service switching in Kansas City, Missouri. It was built as Wabash 547 in 1964. It was the last locomotive ever built for the Wabash. It was donated to the National Museum of Transportation in 2006, then was brought out of retirement in 2011 and shipped to Mid America Car & Locomotive to be restored to operation, then put in service in 2014.
- Western Pacific Railroad 3002 is preserved at Ogden Union Station in Ogden, Utah and was restored to its as-delivered appearance.
- RF&P 136 is preserved and operational at the Hartwell Railroad in Social Circle, Georgia. The railroad is known for operating locomotives that retain their liveries from predecessor railroads, which 136 still retains its original RF&P paint.

== Bibliography ==
- Pinkepank, Jerry A. (1973). The Second Diesel Spotter's Guide. Milwaukee, Wisconsin: Kalmbach Publishing. ISBN 978-0-89024-026-7.

== See also ==
- List of GM-EMD locomotives
- List of GMD Locomotives
