= Gilmore Township, Benzie County, Michigan =

Gilmore Township, Michigan
- Civil township
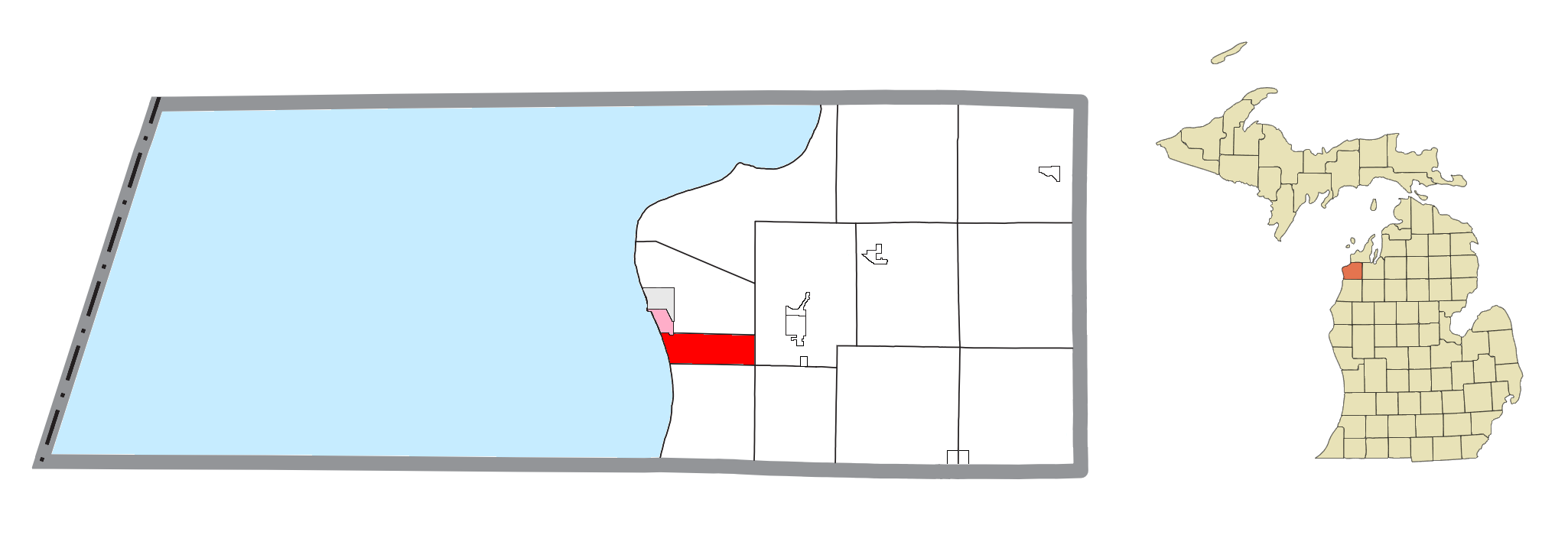
- Location within Benzie County (red) and the administered village of Elberta (pink)

- Location within the state of Michigan Gilmore Township (the United States)
- Coordinates: 44°36′16″N 86°12′40″W
- Country: United States
- State: Michigan
- County: Benzie
- Organized: 1867

Area
  - Total: 7.5 sq mi (19.4 km^{2})
  - Land: 7.1 sq mi (18.5 km^{2})
  - Water: 0.39 sq mi (1.0 km^{2})
- Elevation: 584 ft (178 m)

Population (2020)
  - Total: 813
  - Density: 115/sq mi (44.4/km^{2})
- Time zone: UTC-5 (Eastern (EST))
  - Summer (DST): UTC-4 (EDT)
- ZIP code(s): 49616, 49628, 49635
- Area code: 231
- FIPS code: 26-32180
- GNIS feature ID: 1626353
- Website: https://www.gilmoretownship.org/

Gilmore Township is a civil township of Benzie County in the U.S. state of Michigan. The population was 813 at the 2020 census. The L-shaped township contains the village of Elberta and is bordered on the north by the city of Frankfort. The narrow township is located between Crystal Lake Township to the north and Blaine Township to the south, as well as a short boundary with Benzonia Township to the east.

== History ==
Gilmore Township was organized in 1867.

== Geography ==
According to the United States Census Bureau, the township has a total area of 7.5 square miles (19.5 km^{2}), of which 7.1 square miles (18.5 km^{2}) is land and 0.39 square miles (1.0 km^{2}), or 4.89%, is water.

== Demographics ==
As of the census of 2000, there were 850 people, 341 households, and 236 families residing in the township. The population density was 117.2 inhabitants per square mile (45.3/km^{2}). There were 439 housing units at an average density of 60.5 per square mile (23.4/km^{2}). The racial makeup of the township was 97.06% White, 0.35% African American, 0.71% Native American, 0.35% from other races, and 1.53% from two or more races. Hispanic or Latino of any race were 0.94% of the population.

There were 341 households, out of which 32.6% had children under the age of 18 living with them, 53.4% were married couples living together, 10.6% had a female householder with no husband present, and 30.5% were non-families. 26.1% of all households were made up of individuals, and 11.1% had someone living alone who was 65 years of age or older. The average household size was 2.49 and the average family size was 2.98.

In the township the population was spread out, with 27.8% under the age of 18, 6.8% from 18 to 24, 29.6% from 25 to 44, 21.2% from 45 to 64, and 14.6% who were 65 years of age or older. The median age was 37 years. For every 100 females, there were 101.4 males. For every 100 females age 18 and over, there were 98.7 males.

The median income for a household in the township was $29,712, and the median income for a family was $33,824. Males had a median income of $27,361 versus $21,591 for females. The per capita income for the township was $14,999. About 6.9% of families and 9.1% of the population were below the poverty line, including 10.8% of those under age 18 and 5.9% of those age 65 or over.
