= Ann Arbor Railroad (1895–1976) =

Defunct American railroad (1895–1976)

Overview
- Headquarters: Toledo, OH (early years), St. Louis, MI (1925-1963), Dearborn, MI (1963-1976)
- Reporting mark: AA
- Locale: Michigan and Ohio
- Dates of operation: September 21, 1895–April 1, 1976

Technical
- Track gauge: 4 ft 8 1/2 in (1,435 mm) standard gauge

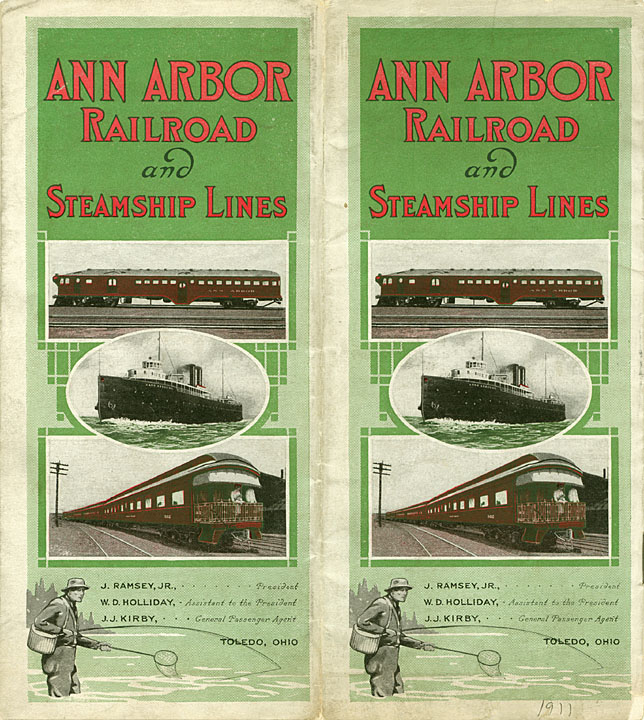
The cover from the Ann Arbor Railroad and Steamship Lines 1911 passenger timetable

The Ann Arbor Railroad (reporting mark AA) was an American railroad that operated between Toledo, Ohio, and Elberta and Frankfort, Michigan (about 294 route miles) with train ferry operations across Lake Michigan. In 1967, it reported 572 million net ton-miles of revenue freight, including 107 million in "lake transfer service". It also operated the Manistique and Lake Superior Railroad, a 39-mile subsidiary.

The company's main line is partially abandoned with ownership split between the state of Michigan, the Huron and Eastern Railway, and the shortline Ann Arbor Railroad (founded in 1988).

== History ==
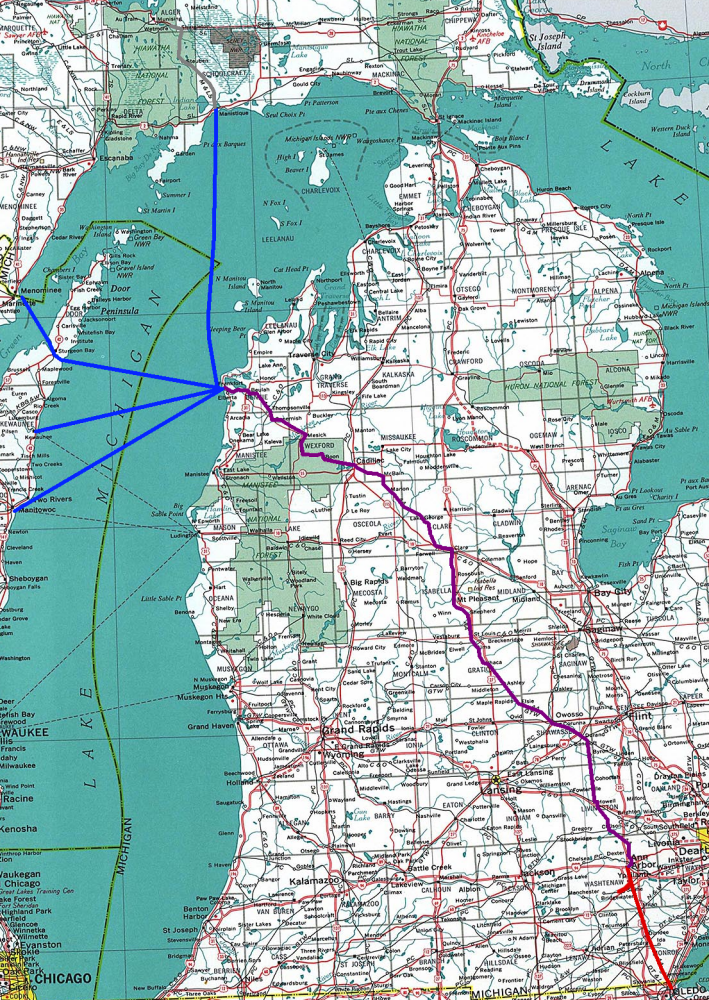
Map of the Ann Arbor and ferry connections

The railroad company was chartered September 21, 1895, as successor to the Toledo, Ann Arbor and North Michigan Railway. In 1905, it was acquired by the Detroit, Toledo & Ironton Railway (DTI), and Eugene Zimmerman assumed presidency of both lines. DTI went bankrupt three years later. Zimmerman remained president until 1909 when he lost control of the line to Joseph Ramsey Jr. and Newman Erb. Ramsey assumed the presidency, serving until 1913 when Erb became president and ran the line for the next eleven years. Erb also served as president of the Minneapolis and St. Louis Railway 1912 to 1916. Wabash Railroad gained control of Ann Arbor Railroad in 1925.

The company operated one passenger train per day in each direction between its Toledo station and its Elberta boat landing. Major stops on the route included Ann Arbor, Durand, Owosso, Mt. Pleasant and Cadillac. Its passenger operations were hampered by the limited number of noteworthy cities en route; moreover, only Durand Union Station served trains other than AA's; in other cities, passengers had to travel across town to reach connecting trains. The AA's last passenger train ran on July 19, 1950.

Wabash gave up control of AA in 1963 as part of its absorption into the Norfolk and Western. The DTI, owned by the giant Pennsylvania Railroad (PRR), again gained control in 1963. The combined DTI and AA were operated as independent subsidiaries of the PRR but suffered from the parent company's ill-fated 1968 merger with the New York Central. Upon the resulting Penn Central's 1970 bankruptcy, the DTI and AA were sold off to private investors. The AA owned a subsidiary, the Manistique and Lake Superior Railroad, from somewhere shortly after that line's origin in 1909 until it was abandoned in 1968.

After going bankrupt in 1973, the Ann Arbor ceased operations as a railroad on April 1, 1976. The State of Michigan bought most of the line, subsidizing Conrail as a designated operator. The contract was transferred to the Michigan Interstate Railway in 1977. Michigan Interstate operated the line as the "Ann Arbor Railroad System." In 1982, the state split the operating contract among Michigan Interstate from Toledo to Ann Arbor, Tuscola & Saginaw Bay Railway from Ann Arbor to Alma, and Michigan Northern Railway from Alma to Elberta. In 1984 the state ended Michigan Northern's contract and designated Tuscola & Saginaw Bay as the operator on that portion.

On October 7, 1988, a new Ann Arbor Railroad began operating the portion south of Ann Arbor; the Great Lakes Central Railroad now serves the remaining portions of the line. Some sections have been abandoned: from Yuma to Elberta and Frankfort (approximately 45 miles), about 10 miles in Shiawassee County, Michigan (in three discontinuous sections), and the trackage around the former Cherry Street Station in Toledo.

== Train ferries ==
The Ann Arbor's Lake Michigan train ferry fleet at Elberta started in November 1892 when the Toledo, Ann Arbor and Northern Michigan Railway acquired its first two boats, Ann Arbor 1 and Ann Arbor 2. At its height, the AA served four ports on Lake Michigan:

- Kewaunee, Wisconsin, from 1892 connecting with Kewaunee, Green Bay and Western Railroad
- Menominee, Michigan, from 1894 connecting with Chicago, Milwaukee and St. Paul Railway, Chicago and North Western Railway, and Wisconsin and Michigan Railroad
- Gladstone, Michigan, from 1895 connecting with the Minneapolis, St. Paul and Sault Ste. Marie Railroad. Later moved to Manistique, connecting with Duluth, South Shore and Atlantic Railway via AA subsidiary Manistique and Lake Superior Railroad
- Manitowoc, Wisconsin, from 1896 connecting with Chicago and North Western Railway, and Wisconsin Central Railway

=== Fleet ===
Altogether, eight boats were built for service with the AA, and one was leased from the Grand Trunk Milwaukee Car Ferry Company.

- SS Ann Arbor No. 1 – designed by Frank E. Kirby and built by Craig Ship Building, Toledo, Ohio, in 1892. Capacity 24 cars on four tracks.
- SS Ann Arbor No. 2 – designed by Kirby and built by Craig Ship Building, Toledo, Ohio, in 1892. Capacity 24 cars on four tracks.
- SS Ann Arbor No. 3 – built by Globe Iron Works, Cleveland, Ohio, in 1898.
- SS Ann Arbor No. 4 – built by Globe Iron Works, Cleveland, Ohio, in 1906.
- SS Ann Arbor No. 5 – designed by Kirby and built by Toledo Shipbuilding Company in 1910.
- SS Ann Arbor No. 6 – built by Great Lakes Engineering Works, Ecorse, Michigan, in 1917 and rebuilt in 1959 as the MV Arthur K. Atkinson.
- SS Ann Arbor No. 7 – built by Manitowoc Shipbuilding Company in 1925 and rebuilt in 1965 as the MV Viking.
- SS Wabash – built by Toledo Shipbuilding Company in 1927, and rebuilt in 1962 as the SS City of Green Bay.
- SS City of Milwaukee, a Grand Trunk Western vessel was leased in 1978.

== See also ==
- History of railroads in Michigan
