= Elberta, Michigan =

- Village
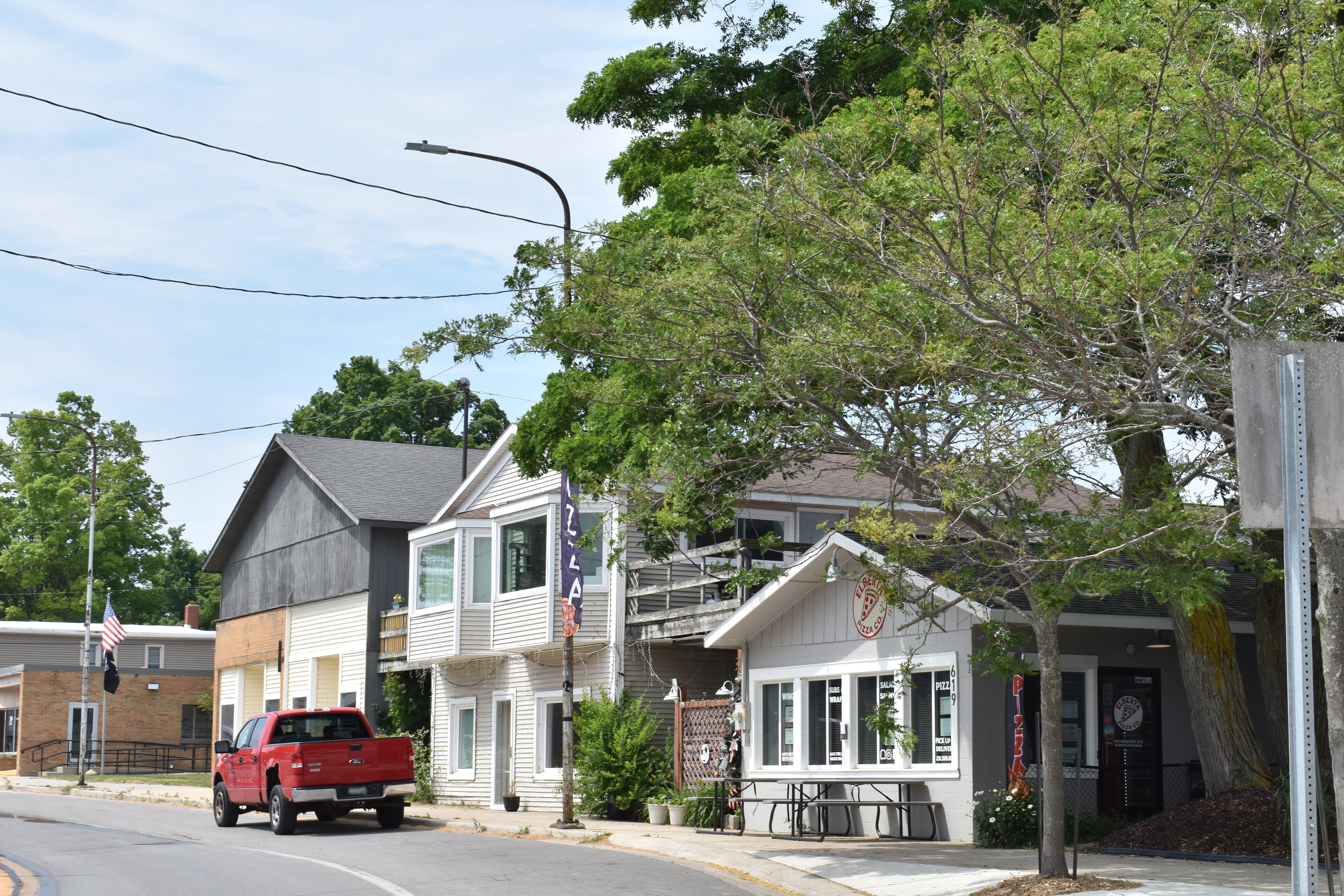
- Elberta in July 2026

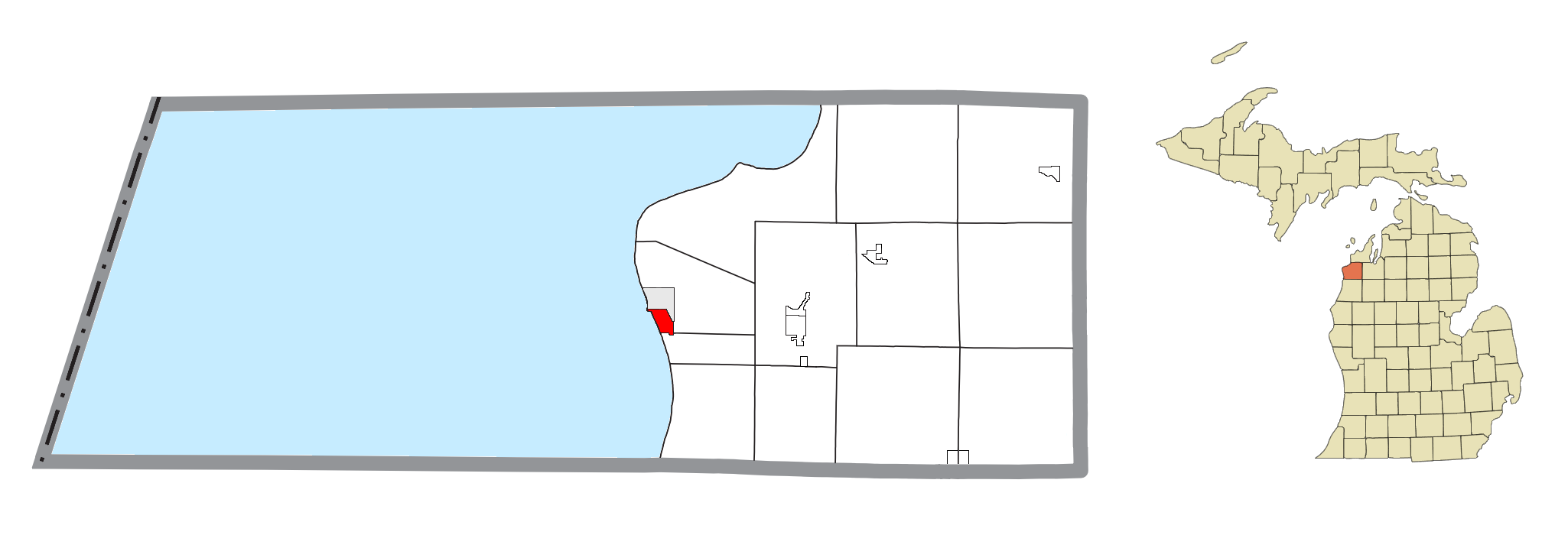
- Location within Benzie County

- Location within the state of Michigan
- Coordinates: 44°37′03″N 86°13′36″W
- Country: United States
- State: Michigan
- County: Benzie
- Township: Gilmore

Area
  - Total: 1.01 sq mi (2.61 km^{2})
  - Land: 0.75 sq mi (1.94 km^{2})
  - Water: 0.26 sq mi (0.68 km^{2})
- Elevation: 590 ft (180 m)

Population (2020)
  - Total: 329
  - Density: 439.4/sq mi (169.66/km^{2})
- Time zone: UTC-5 (Eastern (EST))
  - Summer (DST): UTC-4 (EDT)
- ZIP code(s): 49628
- Area code: 231
- FIPS code: 26-25180
- GNIS feature ID: 0625422

Elberta (/ˌɛlˈbɜːr.tə/ el-BER-tə) is a village in Benzie County, Michigan, United States. The population was 329 at the 2020 census. Located in Gilmore Township, Elberta overlooks Lake Michigan and lies across Betsie Lake from Frankfort. Elberta is part of Northern Michigan.

== History ==
Elberta was first settled in 1855 and incorporated as South Frankfort in 1894. It was renamed Elberta in 1911 for the local Elberta peach. The village's founder is said to be George M. Cartwright.

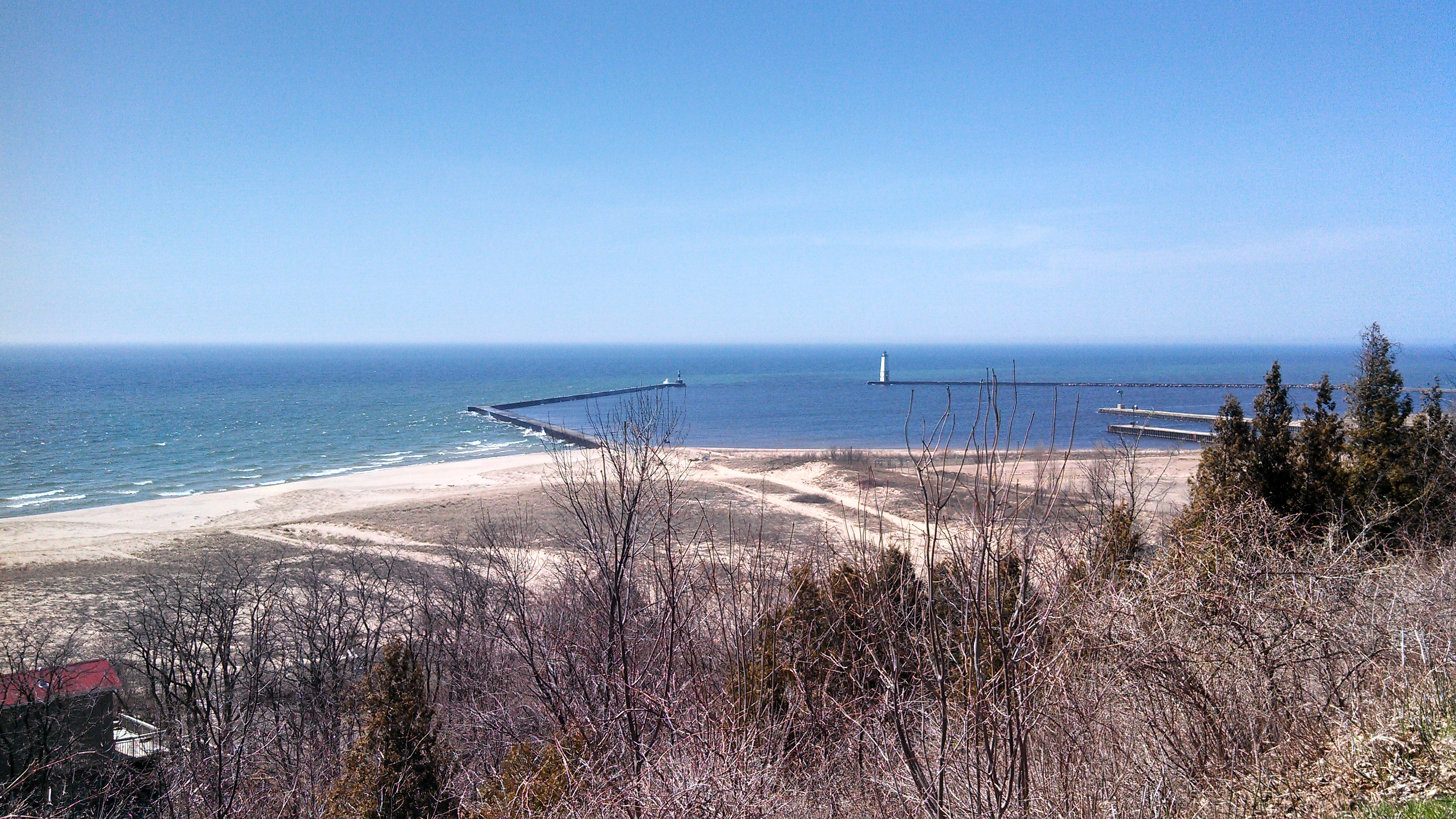
Lake Michigan from Elberta Bluffs

M-168, previously one of the shortest state highways in Michigan, extended 0.95 miles (1.53 km) from a junction with M-22 in downtown Elberta to the former Ann Arbor Railroad ferry docks in Elberta. This highway was decommissioned in 2012.

== Geography ==
- According to the United States Census Bureau, the village has a total area of 0.99 square miles (2.56 km^{2}), of which 0.74 square miles (1.92 km^{2}) is land and 0.25 square miles (0.65 km^{2}) is water. The downtown is at 44°37′10″N 86°13′35″W.
- Elberta is part of Northern Michigan.

=== Major highways ===
- M-22 is a north–south highway that runs through the village, paralleling the coast of Lake Michigan for its length. M-22 can be used to access Frankfort.
- M-168 is a former highway that ran through the village, connecting M-22 to the former Ann Arbor Railroad ferry docks. This highway was decommissioned in 2012.

=== Ferry and rail transport ===
From the 1890s to July 1950, the Ann Arbor Railroad operated launched ferries from docks at Elberta. The ferries crossed Lake Michigan to two points in Wisconsin, and a fourth ferry line went north to Gladstone, Michigan in the Michigan Upper Peninsula.

In the same period, the Ann Arbor Railroad operated a train a day south to and from Cadillac, Owosso, Durand, Ann Arbor, and then to its southern terminus in Toledo, Ohio.

== Demographics ==
Historical population
Census	Pop.	Note	%±
1900	639		—
1910	681		6.6%
1920	588		−13.7%
1930	609		3.6%
1940	617		1.3%
1950	850		37.8%
1960	552		−35.1%
1970	542		−1.8%
1980	556		2.6%
1990	478		−14.0%
2000	457		−4.4%
2010	372		−18.6%
2020	329		−11.6%
U.S. Decennial Census

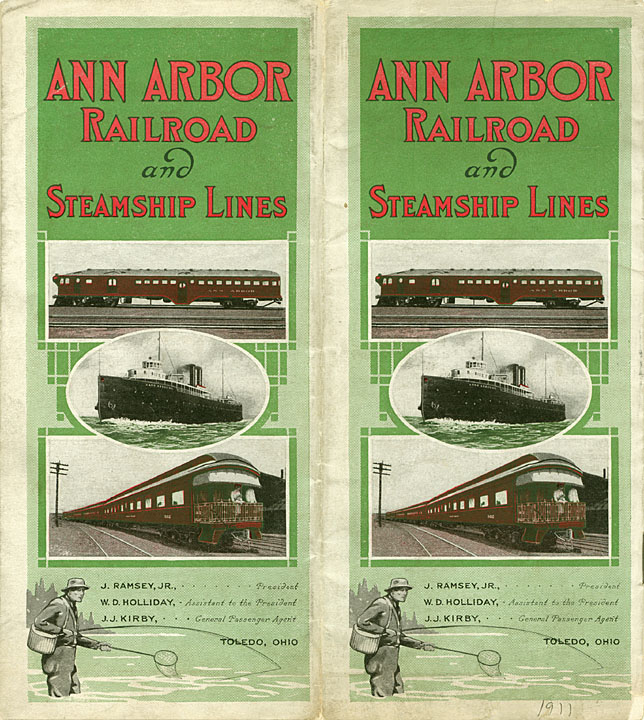
These Ann Arbor Railroad cars and steamships would have been familiar sights in Elberta in 1911, when this timetable was printed.

=== 2010 census ===
As of the census of 2010, there were 372 people, 173 households, and 101 families living in the village. The population density was 502.7 inhabitants per square mile (194.1/km^{2}). There were 229 housing units at an average density of 309.5 per square mile (119.5/km^{2}). The racial makeup of the village was 95.2% White, 0.8% African American, 0.8% Native American, 0.3% Asian, 0.8% from other races, and 2.2% from two or more races. Hispanic or Latino of any race were 3.5% of the population.

There were 173 households, of which 22.5% had children under the age of 18 living with them, 42.8% were married couples living together, 8.1% had a female householder with no husband present, 7.5% had a male householder with no wife present, and 41.6% were non-families. 34.7% of all households were made up of individuals, and 13.8% had someone living alone who was 65 years of age or older. The average household size was 2.15 and the average family size was 2.71.

The median age in the village was 47.8 years. 18.5% of residents were under the age of 18; 7.5% were between the ages of 18 and 24; 19.2% were from 25 to 44; 33.1% were from 45 to 64; and 21.5% were 65 years of age or older. The gender makeup of the village was 51.9% male and 48.1% female.

=== 2000 census ===
As of the census of 2000, there were 457 people, 190 households, and 124 families living in the village. The population density was 612.9 inhabitants per square mile (236.6/km^{2}). There were 237 housing units at an average density of 317.8 per square mile (122.7/km^{2}). The racial makeup of the village was 95.62% White, 0.66% African American, 1.31% Native American, 0.22% from other races, and 2.19% from two or more races. Hispanic or Latino of any race were 0.88% of the population.

There were 190 households, out of which 31.6% had children under the age of 18 living with them, 44.2% were married couples living together, 15.8% had a female householder with no husband present, and 34.7% were non-families. 28.9% of all households were made up of individuals, and 10.0% had someone living alone who was 65 years of age or older. The average household size was 2.41 and the average family size was 2.90.

In the village, the population was spread out, with 29.3% under the age of 18, 6.8% from 18 to 24, 28.7% from 25 to 44, 20.1% from 45 to 64, and 15.1% who were 65 years of age or older. The median age was 36 years. For every 100 females, there were 96.1 males. For every 100 females age 18 and over, there were 94.6 males.

The median income for a household in the village was $28,403, and the median income for a family was $31,250. Males had a median income of $27,159 versus $21,806 for females. The per capita income for the village was $13,594. About 9.0% of families and 10.7% of the population were below the poverty line, including 13.6% of those under age 18 and 6.7% of those age 65 or over.
