= National Register of Historic Places listings in Manistee County, Michigan =

Location of Manistee County in Michigan

This is a list of the National Register of Historic Places listings in Manistee County, Michigan.

This is intended to be a complete list of the properties and districts on the National Register of Historic Places in Manistee County, Michigan, United States. Latitude and longitude coordinates are provided for many National Register properties and districts; these locations may be seen together in a map.

There are 18 properties and districts listed on the National Register in the county, including one National Historic Landmark.

This National Park Service list is complete through NPS recent listings posted October 2, 2026.

== Current listings ==
	Name on the Register	Image	Date listed	Location	City or town	Description
1	Simeon Babcock House	Simeon Babcock House	November 30, 1999 (#99001455)	420 Third St. 44°14′40″N 86°19′33″W	Manistee	
2	Camp Tosebo	Camp Tosebo	December 21, 2000 (#00000644)	7228 Miller Rd., Onekama Township; 44°20′58″N 86°14′32″W	Red Park vicinity	
3	City of Milwaukee	City of Milwaukee	December 14, 1990 (#90002221)	99 Arthur Street; 44°15′34″N 86°18′57″W	Manistee	When listed on the National Register in 1990, the ship was located in Elberta, Michigan (Benzie County), but was moved to Manistee in 2000. It is located at 99 Arthur Street.
4	First Congregational Church	First Congregational Church	June 25, 1974 (#74000995)	412 S. 4th St. 44°14′41″N 86°19′24″W	Manistee	
5	Guardian Angels Church	Guardian Angels Church	April 14, 2020 (#100005180)	371-375 Fifth St. 44°14′31″N 86°19′20″W	Manistee	
6	John J. Makinen Bottle House	John J. Makinen Bottle House	July 9, 1987 (#87000423)	14551 Wuoksi Ave. 44°22′23″N 86°00′33″W	Kaleva	
7	Manistee Central Business District	Manistee Central Business District	May 7, 1982 (#82002851)	Roughly bonded by Maple, Washington, Water and River Sts. 44°14′54″N 86°19′26″W	Manistee	
8	Manistee County Courthouse Fountain	Manistee County Courthouse Fountain	February 8, 1988 (#88000065)	Onekama Village Park; 44°21′48″N 86°12′23″W	Onekama	
9	Manistee Fire Station	Manistee Fire Station	January 20, 2026 (#100012565)	281 First St. 44°14′44″N 86°19′00″W	Manistee	
10	Manistee Harbor, South Breakwater	Manistee Harbor, South Breakwater	October 20, 1995 (#95001162)	Mouth of the Manistee R., at Lake Michigan; 44°15′05″N 86°21′00″W	Manistee	
11	Manistee Iron Works Machine Shop	Manistee Iron Works Machine Shop	July 19, 2010 (#10000477)	254 River St. 44°15′01″N 86°18′59″W	Manistee	
12	Manistee North Pier	Manistee North Pier	May 17, 1990 (#90000718)	W end of Fifth Ave. 44°15′04″N 86°20′42″W	Manistee	
13	Orchard Beach State Park	Orchard Beach State Park	December 8, 2009 (#09001064)	2064 N. Lakeshore Road; 44°18′11″N 86°18′06″W	Manistee	
14	Our Saviour's Evangelical Lutheran Church	Our Saviour's Evangelical Lutheran Church	August 21, 1972 (#72000639)	300 Walnut St. 44°14′37″N 86°19′15″W	Manistee	
15	Portage Point Inn Complex	Portage Point Inn Complex	October 8, 1985 (#85003001)	8513 S. Portage Point Dr. 44°22′03″N 86°15′32″W	Onekama	
16	Ramsdell Theatre	Ramsdell Theatre	January 13, 1972 (#72000640)	101 Maple St. 44°14′44″N 86°19′23″W	Manistee	
17	Sandenburgh-Rogers Summer Resort Complex	Sandenburgh-Rogers Summer Resort Complex	December 6, 1996 (#96001421)	2046 Crescent Beach Rd., Onekama Township; 44°21′28″N 86°15′41″W	Parkdale	
18	Udell Lookout Tower	Udell Lookout Tower	August 22, 1996 (#95001013)	Forest Rd. 5207, Huron-Manistee National Forest; 44°12′29″N 86°05′59″W	Wellston	
19	Walther League Camp – Camp Arcadia	Walther League Camp – Camp Arcadia	April 17, 2017 (#100000884)	3046 Oak St. 44°29′45″N 86°14′27″W	Arcadia Township	

== See also ==
- List of Michigan State Historic Sites in Manistee County, Michigan
- List of National Historic Landmarks in Michigan
- National Register of Historic Places listings in Michigan
- Listings in neighboring counties: Benzie, Grand Traverse, Lake, Mason, Wexford
