= List of Michigan State Historic Sites in Manistee County =

Location of Manistee County in Michigan

The following is a list of Michigan State Historic Sites in Manistee County, Michigan. Sites marked with a dagger (†) are also listed on the National Register of Historic Places in Manistee County, Michigan.

== Current listings ==
Name	Image	Location	City	Listing date
Simeon Babcock House†		420 Third Street	Manistee	September 3, 1998
Camp Tosebo Historic District	Camp Tosebo	7228 Miller Road, Red Park	Manistee	October 24, 1997
Church of the Holy Trinity (Episcopal) and Rectory		410 Second Street	Manistee	June 15, 1979
Danish Lutheran Church†		300 Walnut Street	Manistee	May 18, 1971
William Douglas House		521 Pine Street	Manistee	March 19, 1980
First Congregational Church†		412 Fourth Street, between Oak and Maple streets	Manistee	November 15, 1973
First Scandinavian Lutheran Church	First Scandinavian Lutheran Church	331 Fourth Street	Manistee	April 28, 1987
Great Fire of 1871 Informational Designation		Orchard Beach State Park, 2 miles N of Manistee on M-110	Manistee vicinity	January 19, 1957
Roscoe E. Harris Summer Cottage	Roscoe E. Harris Summer Cottage	2254 Lakeisle Avenue, Portage Park Resort	Onekama	March 20, 1984
Hotel Wellston (Demolished)		17201 6th Street	Wellston	April 25, 1988
House at Eastlake (Demolished)		Corner of Main and Goff streets	Eastlake	October 22, 1963
Kaleva Informational Designation	Kaleva Informational	Wuoski Avenue	Kaleva	April 15, 1977
John J. Makinen Bottle House†		14551 Wuoksi Avenue	Kaleva	January 13, 1982
Manistee City Library		95 Maple Street	Manistee	November 16, 1995
Manistee County Courthouse Fountain†	Manistee Courthouse Fountain	Onekama Village Park	Onekama	July 17, 1986
Manistee Fire Hall	Manistee Fire Hall	281 First Street, SW corner of Hancock	Manistee	April 20, 1989
Harriet Quimby Childhood Home	Harriet Quimby Childhood Home	14789 Erdman Road	Arcadia	September 3, 1998
Ramsdell Theatre†		101 Maple Street	Manistee	June 19, 1971
Sandenburgh-Rogers Summer Resort Complex†	Sandenburgh-Rogers Summer Resort Complex	2046 Crescent Beach Road	Manistee	February 29, 1996
William W. Vincent House	William W. Vincent House	431 Cedar Street	Manistee	December 19, 1984

== See also ==
- National Register of Historic Places listings in Manistee County, Michigan

== Sources ==
- Historic Sites Online – Manistee County. Michigan State Housing Developmental Authority. Accessed May 17, 2011.
