= Kaleva Norman Dickson Schools =

School district in Michigan, United States

Address
- 4400 North High Bridge Road Brethren, Manistee County, Michigan, 49619; United States

District information
- Motto: Small school, big family
- Grades: PreKindergarten–12
- Superintendent: Jakob Veith
- Schools: 3
- Budget: $9,614,000 2022–2023 expenditures
- NCES District ID: 2620010

Students and staff
- Students: 514 (2024–2025)
- Teachers: 30.71 (on an FTE basis) (2024–2025)
- Staff: 74.8 FTE (2024–2025)
- Student–teacher ratio: 16.74 (2024–2025)
- District mascot: Bobcats

Other information
- Website: kndschools.org

Kaleva Norman Dickson Schools (also known as KND Schools) is a public school district in Northern Michigan. In Manistee County, it serves Brethren, Kaleva, the townships of Dickson, Maple Grove, Norman, and parts of the townships of Bear Lake, Brown, Marilla, Pleasanton, Springdale, and Stronach. It also serves part of Meade Township in Mason County.

The district covers 350 square miles (910 km^{2}) of rural and wilderness areas, including parts of the Manistee National Forest.

== History ==
Kaleva's first school was built in 1904, but it was destroyed by fire in 1912. Kaleva's school district was officially organized in 1914 and its first class graduated in 1917. The Kaleva and Norman-Dickson school districts consolidated around 1964.

Voters passed a bond issue in 1963 to expand Brethren High School, site of the district's current K-12 school building. That same year, the school was the first in the state to offer a vocational course in forestry and logging.

The preschool, housed in a portable building near the school, will be housed in a new Early Childhood Center after the passage of a 2025 construction bond. Other improvements will also be made to the school.

== Schools ==
Schools in KND school district share a building at 4400 North High Bridge Road in Brethren.

Schools in Kaleva Norman Dickson Schools
School	Notes
Brethren High School	Grades 9–12
Brethren Middle School	Grades 7-8
KND Elementary	Grades K-6
4-Star Preschool	Preschool
