= Norman Township, Michigan =

- Township
- Location within Michigan Location within the United States
- Coordinates: 44°12′48″N 85°57′14″W
- Country: United States
- State: Michigan
- County: Manistee

Government
  - Type: Board of Trustees
  - Kevin Schuessler: Supervisor

Area
  - Total: 72.3 sq mi (187 km^{2})
  - Land: 70.8 sq mi (183 km^{2})
  - Water: 1.5 sq mi (3.9 km^{2})
- Elevation: 781 ft (238 m)

Population (2020)
  - Total: 1,567
  - Density: 22.1/sq mi (8.5/km^{2})
- Time zone: UTC-5 (Eastern (EST))
  - Summer (DST): UTC-4 (EDT)
- ZIP codes: 49689 (Wellston); 49644 (Irons); 49660 (Manistee)
- Area code: 231
- FIPS code: 26-101-57900
- GNIS feature ID: 1626809
- Website: www.normantownship.org

Norman Township is a civil township of Manistee County in the U.S. state of Michigan. The population was 1,567 at the 2020 census.

== History ==
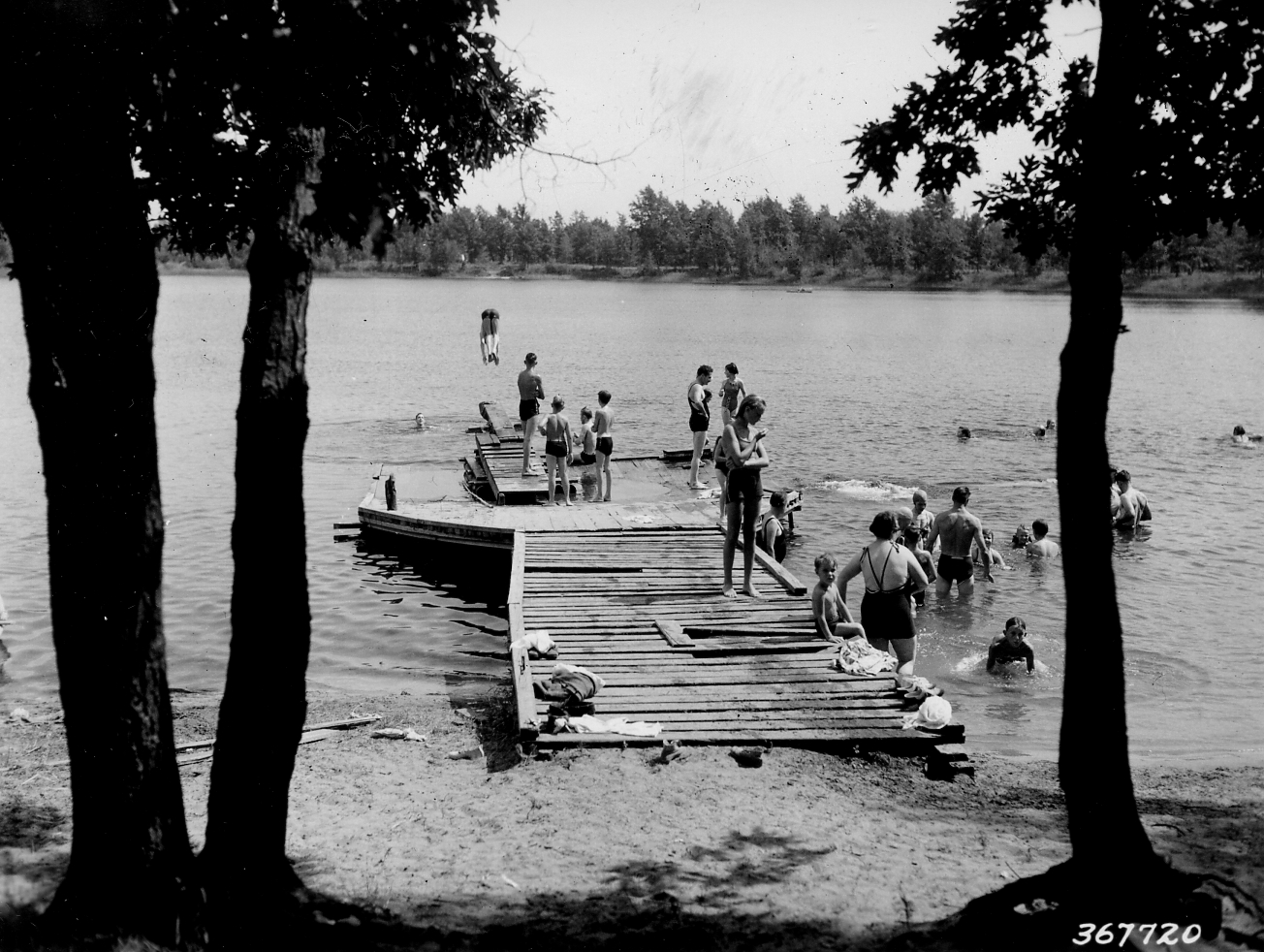
Swimming at Crystal Lake in Wellston, 1938

Norman Township was formed in 1911 and named after Ed Norman. He was a surveyor and estimated, bought and sold timber, cutting a lot of it himself. He located here in about 1897, and in the second year, E. G. Filer, who owned the standing timber, donated the school house. Norman and his wife Elizabeth had 16 children.

During this time Ed was supervisor of Stronach Township. He cut limbs off his poplars at home and planted them along the road to Filer City. Mrs. Norman recalled that there was some criticism about it by a neighboring township. Residents from this section usually got what they wanted at Stronach. They thought it would be better to divide the township. Ed took about 200 men who were working on Stronach Dam over to vote and they won their point. Thus Norman township was formed in 1911.

== Communities ==
There are no incorporated municipalities in the township. There are two unincorporated communities:

- Dublin is in the southern part of the township within the Manistee National Forest at 44°10′46″N 85°55′53″W. The main roads of the community are Seaman Road (north-south), Snyder Road (north-south) and Hoxeyville Road (east-west). Dublin is located just a mile north of Sand Lake Camp, a U.S. Forest Service public campground. Dublin is also partially in Lake County due to Sand Lake being in both counties.the late James Earl Jones was raised by his maternal grandparents on a farm in Dublin
- Wellston is in the Manistee National Forest just south of M-55, about 20 miles (32 km) east of Manistee and 29 miles (47 km) west of Cadillac at 44°13′01″N 85°57′28″W. The main roads of the community are Seaman Road, Bosschem Road, Tippy Dam Road, and M-55. The ZIP code is 49689 and serves the northern and eastern portions of the township as well as portions of Dickson Township to the north and South Branch Township to the east. Wellston was named for the first postmaster, Adelmer J. Wells. The post office officially opened June 30, 1892. The town was founded by the Swigart Land Company along the Chicago and West Michigan Railroad. Wellston is home to the world-renowned critically ill kids' ministry Little Mary's Hospitality House, founded in 1982.

== Geography ==
Norman Township occupies the southeast corner of Manistee County and is bordered by Wexford County to the east, Lake County to the south, and Mason County to the southwest. According to the U.S. Census Bureau, the township has a total area of 72.3 square miles (187 km^{2}), of which 70.8 square miles (183 km^{2}) are land and 1.5 square miles (3.9 km^{2}), or 2.08%, are water. The Pine River crosses the township from east to north, flowing into Tippy Reservoir on the Manistee River, which continues west to Lake Michigan.

=== Climate ===
This climatic region has large seasonal temperature differences, with warm to hot (and often humid) summers and cold (sometimes severely cold) winters. According to the Köppen Climate Classification system, Norman Township has a humid continental climate, abbreviated "Dfb" on climate maps.

== Demographics ==
As of the census of 2000, there were 1,676 people, 681 households, and 493 families residing in the township. The population density was 23.7 per square mile (9.1/km^{2}). There were 1,632 housing units at an average density of 23.0 per square mile (8.9/km^{2}). The racial makeup of the township was 96.00% White, 0.72% African American, 1.25% Native American, 0.12% Asian, 0.42% from other races, and 1.49% from two or more races. Hispanic or Latino people of any race were 0.78% of the population.

There were 681 households, out of which 26.6% had children under the age of 18 living with them, 60.1% were married couples living together, 7.6% had a female householder with no husband present, and 27.5% were non-families. 22.2% of all households were made up of individuals, and 9.0% had someone living alone who was 65 years of age or older. The average household size was 2.46 and the average family size was 2.82.

In the township, 23.6% of the population was under the age of 18, 5.2% was from 18 to 24, 24.7% from 25 to 44, 29.4% from 45 to 64, and 17.1% was 65 years of age or older. The median age was 43 years. For every 100 females, there were 106.2 males. For every 100 females age 18 and over, there were 103.5 males.

The median income for a household in the township was $31,010, and the median income for a family was $35,057. Males had a median income of $33,958 versus $19,688 for females. The per capita income for the township was $16,081. About 8.6% of families and 15.2% of the population were below the poverty line, including 20.7% of those under age 18 and 10.9% of those age 65 or over.
