= Bear Lake Township, Michigan =

Bear Lake Township is the name of some places in the U.S. state of Michigan:

- Bear Lake Township, Kalkaska County, Michigan
- Bear Lake Township, Manistee County, Michigan
