= Pine River (Manistee River tributary) =

Location
- Country: United States
- State: Michigan
- Counties: Osceola, Wexford, Lake, Manistee
- Cities: Tustin, Wellston, Hoxeyville

Physical characteristics
- Source
  - location: Osceola County
  - coordinates: 44°06′00″N 85°31′39″W
  - elevation: 1,102 ft (336 m)
- Mouth: Tippy Dam Pond on the Manistee River
  - location: Manistee County
  - coordinates: 44°13′37″N 85°54′27″W
  - elevation: 685 ft (209 m)
- Length: 53.6 mi (86.3 km)(Main stem)
- Basin size: 265 sq mi (690 km^{2})

Basin features
- Tributaries
  - left: East Branch
  - right: North Branch

National Wild and Scenic River
- Type: Scenic
- Designated: March 3, 1992

The Pine River, formerly known as the South Branch Manistee River, is a 53.6-mile-long (86.3 km) tributary of the Manistee River in the U.S. state of Michigan. It forms at the confluence of the North Branch and East Branch of the Pine River in northwest Osceola County, flows southwest, then west and north through the northeast corner of Lake County and into southwest Wexford County, emptying into the Tippy Dam Pond on the Manistee River in Manistee County. The Pine River watershed drains an area of 265 square miles (690 km^{2}).

The river flows through a section of the Huron–Manistee National Forest, with multiple campgrounds, scenic overlooks and launch sites for personal, non-motorized watercraft. During the summer and fall seasons, canoe and kayak liveries are active with tourists taking trips on the Pine. This spring-fed river is constantly chilled and crystal clear, all year around. Much of Michigan's native wildlife can be spotted along the banks of the Pine, including black bears, white-tail deer, and bald eagles.

The Pine River was designated a National Scenic River in 1992.
