= Bear Lake, Michigan =

- Village
- Location in Manistee County, Michigan
- Coordinates: 44°25′13″N 86°8′43″W
- Country: United States
- State: Michigan
- County: Manistee
- Township: Bear Lake

Area
  - Total: 0.32 sq mi (0.82 km^{2})
  - Land: 0.32 sq mi (0.82 km^{2})
  - Water: 0 sq mi (0.00 km^{2})
- Elevation: 791 ft (241 m)

Population (2020)
  - Total: 342
  - Density: 1,083.5/sq mi (418.33/km^{2})
- Time zone: UTC-5 (Eastern (EST))
  - Summer (DST): UTC-4 (EDT)
- ZIP code: 49614
- Area code: 231
- FIPS code: 26-06460
- GNIS feature ID: 2398058
- Website: villageofbearlakemi.gov

Bear Lake is a village in Manistee County in the U.S. state of Michigan. The population was 342 at the 2020 census. The village is located within Bear Lake Township.

== History ==
In 1836, individuals from various tribes of native people signed the Treaty of Washington, which ceded the northwest portion of the Lower Peninsula of Michigan to the United States. At the time, native people lived in the Bear Lake area, evidence remaining in various burial mounds of the region, including one at Pierport.

The next year, in 1837, Michigan became a state.

In 1841, John Stronach and party came to the Manistee area and started a lumber mill. During the following twenty years, the city of Manistee grew as virgin forests were cut, and the logs put into the Manistee rivers to float to the mills on Manistee Lake.

=== Homesteading ===
On May 20, 1862, President Lincoln signed into law the Homestead Act, which offered 160 acres (0.65 km^{2}) of undeveloped federal land to anyone who filed an application, create a farm, and apply for a deed. Almost immediately, people began exploring the area between Manistee and Traverse City, looking for prime farmland.

In 1863, Russell Smith, D.E. Sibley, Elisha Richmond, George W. Hopkins, Simeon Anderson, and others came to Bear Lake on such scouting expeditions. At the time, the region was entirely heavily forested with white pine and hardwoods, and with only a single walking trail. Smith and Sibley both moved their families to the area that year, and began their homesteads. Sibley's homestead was on the north side of Bear Lake; Smith's was on the south side, and included the present village.

By 1864, Simeon Anderson and about 25 other families had started homesteads in the Bear Lake area. In that year Elisha Richmond made his first failed attempt to move his large family to the area from Illinois.

In 1865, the township of Bear Lake, also including the area of Pleasanton, was created, formerly being part of Brown Township. A township council was formed.

By 1867, many more families had established homesteads, and two-thirds of the prime farming land had been claimed. A post office was established, and the Elisha Richmond family completed the eleven-week journey to Bear Lake. In this year, George W. Hopkins, wife Ella Hopkins, brother David H. Hopkins, and sister Martha (Mattie) Hopkins arrived in Manistee to begin a brick manufacturing plant.

About this time, Russell Smith made an offer of some of his land to anyone who would set up a saw mill to turn the trees into lumber and a gristmill to create flour from grain. The offer was taken by Mr. Carpenter and Mr. Harrington, and rudimentary mills for each were constructed. Carpenter and Harrington then subdivided the land and offered it for sale. Stores were established by Anderson, Tillson, Erb, Lewis and A.H. Cook.

By 1870, the Hopkins family had switched from brick manufacturing to lumber, primarily putting logs in the Manistee rivers, and floating them to the mills for sale.

Homesteaders in Bear Lake were cutting the trees, and burning all the trees that they couldn't use, in order to clear the land. There was no one interested in buying the trees, and no way to get cut logs or lumber to market. Prior to the sawmill, boards were brought by boat from Manistee to Portage Lake and then carried, or carted, to Bear Lake.

In 1873, the Hopkins family company purchased 88 acres (360,000 m^{2}) of the Smith property. The Bear Lake Tram Railway was built from the south side of Bear Lake down to Lake Michigan at Pierport. The railway was made of maple wood rails with steel strapping, and horse-drawn trailers were built and put on the rails. This railway enabled the transport of lumber cut in the Bear Lake sawmill to be moved to Lake Michigan, and then sold to the various markets in Chicago and Milwaukee.

In 1874, the Hopkins built a large sawmill, a brickyard, a gristmill, and a store.

=== Lumber boom years ===
On September 25, 1874, the original subdivision or plat map of the village was filed by the Hopkins family members including George W. Hopkins, Ella Hopkins, David H. Hopkins, Maurice M. Hopkins, and Mattie E. "Martha" Hopkins. This plat was amended in 1877, including a slight change to the position of Stuart Street.

The village was platted with 299 lots, and included almost all of the land bordered by the lake on the north, Smith Street on the east, Potter Road on the south, and West Street (which originally ran due north from the current Potter Road – US-31 intersection) on the west. The southwest corner of this rectangle was added to the village as the Hopkins Addition in 1881 with 95 more lots. Most of the Hopkins Addition lots are now occupied by the school, and to the south of the school, owned by the village.

In 1879, prior to the Hopkins Addition, the Smith Addition, which was then owned by Harriet L. Smith, Elisha J. Richmond, and Clara Richmond, added 25 lots to the northeast of the Smith Street – Main Street intersection.

(Six additional plats, the most recent in 1949, expanded the village to its current size, adding all the land between Smith Street and Russell Street. Numerous other plats around the lake created lots for lakeside homes and cottages.)

The 1880 census shows 1,258 people living in Bear Lake and Pleasanton townships, growing by 1890 to 1,880 people.

In 1877, Tyler W. Richmond established the Richmond Drug Company, which, after his death, was run by his wife, children, and grandson until Carl Richmond's death in 1967. The store was in operation until 2020.

In fall 1893, the Village of Bear Lake was incorporated by action of the Board of Supervisors of Manistee County.

The 1900 census shows 2,087 people in the two townships, with 448 of them living in the village.

By June 9, 1902, all of the trees in the area had been cut. George W. Hopkins purchased over a hundred thousand acres in Florida (near Cape Canaveral) and he moved his business there, along with parts of the railway.

=== Post lumber ===
Industry shifted to predominantly agriculture, and later, summer tourism.

== Geography ==
The village is in northwestern Manistee County on the south shore of a lake with the same name. U.S. Route 31 passes through the west and north sides of the village, leading southwest 17 miles (27 km) to Manistee, the county seat, and north 14 miles (23 km) to Benzonia.

According to the United States Census Bureau, the village has a total area of 0.32 square miles (0.83 km^{2}), all of it land. The village is part of the Manistee River watershed.

== Demographics ==
Historical population
Census	Pop.	Note	%±
1880	236		—
1890	432		83.1%
1900	448		3.7%
1910	504		12.5%
1920	323		−35.9%
1930	325		0.6%
1940	327		0.6%
1950	364		11.3%
1960	323		−11.3%
1970	376		16.4%
1980	388		3.2%
1990	339		−12.6%
2000	318		−6.2%
2010	286		−10.1%
2020	342		19.6%
U.S. Decennial Census

=== 2010 census ===
As of the census of 2010, there were 286 people, 118 households, and 78 families residing in the village. The population density was 922.6 inhabitants per square mile (356.2/km^{2}). There were 169 housing units at an average density of 545.2 per square mile (210.5/km^{2}). The racial makeup of the village was 94.1% White, 3.1% Native American, 0.3% Pacific Islander, 1.0% from other races, and 1.4% from two or more races. Hispanic or Latino of any race were 1.4% of the population.

There were 118 households, of which 27.1% had children under the age of 18 living with them, 41.5% were married couples living together, 15.3% had a female householder with no husband present, 9.3% had a male householder with no wife present, and 33.9% were non-families. 28.0% of all households were made up of individuals, and 13.5% had someone living alone who was 65 years of age or older. The average household size was 2.42 and the average family size was 2.90. The median household income was 26,964.

The median age in the village was 40.6 years. 23.8% of residents were under the age of 18; 6.9% were between the ages of 18 and 24; 25.1% were from 25 to 44; 25.4% were from 45 to 64; and 18.5% were 65 years of age or older. The gender makeup of the village was 49.0% male and 51.0% female.

=== 2000 census ===
As of the census of 2000, there were 318 people, 132 households, and 85 families residing in the village. The population density was 1,011.1 inhabitants per square mile (390.4/km^{2}). There were 161 housing units at an average density of 511.9 per square mile (197.6/km^{2}). The racial makeup of the village was 93.71% White, 1.89% Native American, 2.52% Asian, 0.31% from other races, and 1.57% from two or more races. Hispanic or Latino of any race were 4.72% of the population.

There were 132 households, out of which 30.3% had children under the age of 18 living with them, 51.5% were married couples living together, 8.3% had a female householder with no husband present, and 35.6% were non-families. 32.6% of all households were made up of individuals, and 18.9% had someone living alone who was 65 years of age or older. The average household size was 2.41 and the average family size was 2.99.

In the village, the population was spread out, with 26.4% under the age of 18, 7.2% from 18 to 24, 25.2% from 25 to 44, 21.4% from 45 to 64, and 19.8% who were 65 years of age or older. The median age was 39 years. For every 100 females, there were 101.3 males. For every 100 females age 18 and over, there were 90.2 males.

The median income for a household in the village was $31,389, and the median income for a family was $35,139. Males had a median income of $30,000 versus $22,083 for females. The per capita income for the village was $15,170. About 9.2% of families and 12.7% of the population were below the poverty line, including 25.0% of those under age 18 and 8.3% of those age 65 or over.

== School system ==
Bear Lake currently has a K-12 public school. It is one of the schools given the Freedom to Learn grant giving students and teachers use of modern technology such as laptops for use in the classroom. Teachers in the school are helping other teachers across the state with these learning tools.

The Bear Lake Schools district covers most of both Pleasanton Township and Bear Lake Township.

== Business and industry ==
The Bear Lake area is home to various business and industry; primarily agriculture focusing on fruit production, and tourism due to the lake and the adjacent Manistee National Forest and Pere Marquette State Forest.

Bear Lake has oil and natural gas resources. Since the 1970s, various successful projects have produced significant quantities of both.

== Points of interest ==
- Manistee National Forest
- Pere Marquette State Forest
- Northern Michigan Dragway
