= List of churches in the Diocese of Gaylord =

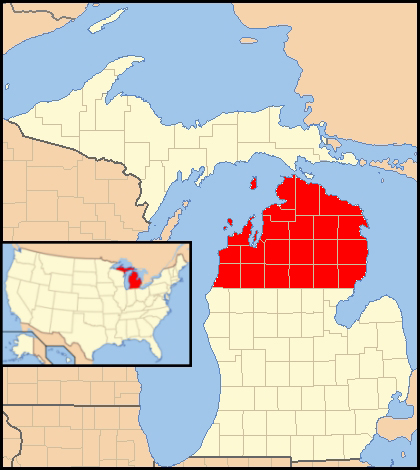
Diocese of Gaylord in red

This is a list of current and former Roman Catholic churches in the Roman Catholic Diocese of Gaylord. The diocese is located in the northern portion of Michigan's lower peninsula and includes the cities of Gaylord, Traverse City, Alpena, Manistee and Petoskey.

The cathedral church of the diocese is the St. Mary, Our Lady of Mount Carmel Cathedral in Gaylord.

== Central Region ==
Name	Image	Location	Description/notes
St. Luke the Evangelist	St. Luke the Evangelist-Bellaire	3088 M-88, Bellaire	
St. Matthew	St. Matthew-Boyne City	1303 Boyne Ave, Boyne City	
St. Augustine	St. Augustine-Boyne Falls	2347 Grove St, Boyne Falls	
St. Joseph	St. Joseph-East Jordan	207 Nichols, East Jordan	
St. Thomas Aquinas	St. Thomas Aquinas-Elmira	2567 Buell Rd, Elmira	
St. Aloysius	St. Aloysius-Fife Lake	403 E. Merritt St, Fife Lake	
St. Mary, Our Lady of Mount Carmel Cathedral	Our Lady of Mt. Carmel-Gaylord	606 N. Ohio Ave, Gaylord	
Old St. Mary	St. Mary's Catholic Church-Gaylord	147 N. Otsego, Gaylord	
St. Mary		707 Spruce St, Grayling	
St. Mary of the Woods		0438 County Rd 612, Kalkaska	
St. Francis of Assisi		3060 Casey St, Lewiston	
St. Anthony of Padua	St. Anthony of Padua-Mancelona	209 N Jefferson, Mancelona	
St. Mary /Our Lady of the Woods Shrine		201 W 8th St, Mio	
St. John Nepomucene	St. John Nepomucene Catholic Church	4976 St. Johns Rd, Praga	
Holy Redeemer	Holy Redeemer-Vanderbilt	8075 Lincoln St, Vanderbilt	

== East Region ==
Name	Image	Location	Description/notes
St. Monica		M-68, Afton	
All Saints		201 S. Ninth St, Alpena	
St. Bernard		Alpena	
St. Gabriel		5570 N. Lake Shore Dr, Black River	
St. Anne		110 S State St, Harrisville	
St. Augustine		24138 Veterans Memorial Hwy, Hillman	
St. Rose of Lima		3433 Herron Rd, Herron	
St. Dominic		9269 County Rd 441, Metz	
St. Raphael		2531 E Mikado Rd, Mikado	
St. Paul		20811 Washington Ave, Onaway	
St. Catherine		2188 W Nicholson Hill Rd, Ossineke	
St. Casimir		10075 M-65 N, Posen	
St. Ignatius of Loyola		585 S Third St, Rogers City	

== North Region ==
Name	Image	Location	Description/notes
Holy Cross		37860 King's Hwy, Beaver Island	
Assumption of Mary, Burt Lake		3192 Indian Rd, Brutus	
St. Mary	St. Mary-Charlevoix	1003 Bridge St, Charlevoix	
St. Mary/St. Charles	St. Mary's Catholic Church-Cheboygan	120 North "D" St, Cheboygan	
Holy Cross	Holy Cross-Cross Village	6624 N Lake Shore Dr, Cross Village	
St. Ignatius	St. Ignatius-Good Hart	101 N Lamkin Rd, Good Hart	
Holy Childhood of Jesus		150 W Main St, Harbor Springs	
Cross in the Woods		7078 M 68, Indian River	
St. Nicholas	St. Nicholas-Pellston	1987 Zulski Rd, Larks Lake	
St. Anthony of Padua	St. Anthony of Padua-Mackinaw City	600 W Central Ave, Mackinaw City	
St. Clement	St. Clement-Pellston	202 N Maple, Pellston	
St. Francis Solanus Mission		Petoskey	Listed on National Register of Historic Places (NRHP)
St. Francis Xavier		513 Howard St, Petoskey	
Sacred Heart	Sacred Heart-Riggsville	4989 Polish Line Rd, Riggsville	

== Southeast Region ==
Name	Image	Location	Description/notes
Holy Family		516 W Lincoln, East Tawas	
St. Pius X		3900 M 65, Hale	
St. Hubert	St. Hubert-Roscommon	7612 W. Higgins Lake Dr, Higgins Lake	
St. James Parish	St. James Parish-Houghton Lake	7878 E Houghton Lake Dr, Houghton Lake	
Holy Family		402 W Peters Rd, Klacking Creek	
Sacred Heart		5300 N US 23, Oscoda	
Our Lady of the Lake	Our Lady of the Lake-Prudenville	1037 W Houghton Lake Dr, Prudenville	
St. Michael Parish	St. Michael Parish-Roscommon	104 N 6th St, Roscommon	
St. Helen		737 N St Helen Rd, St. Helen	
St. Stephen King of Hungary		2811 E Greenwood Rd, Skidway Lake	
St. Joseph		961 W Houghton Ave, West Branch	
St. James		202 E Sherman St, Whittemore	

== Southwest Region ==
Name	Image	Location	Description/notes
St. Ann	St. Ann-Cadillac	800 W 13th St, Cadillac	
St. Raphael	St. Raphael-Copemish	Highway 115, Copemish	
St. Ann	St. Ann-Frankfort	508 Crystal Ave, Frankfort	
St. Edward	St. Edward-Harrietta	207 W Gaston, Harrietta	
St. Stephen	St. Stephen-Lake City	506 Union St, Lake City	
Guardian Angel	Guardian Angel-Manistee	371-375 Fifth St, Manistee	Listed on NRHP; now part of Divine Mercy Parish
St. Joseph	St. Joseph-Manistee	254 6th St, Manistee	Now part of Divine Mercy Parish
St. Mary of Mount Carmel Shrine	St. Mary of Mount Carmel Shrine-Manistee	260 St. Mary's Parkway, Manistee	Built 1961–1962; now part of Divine Mercy Parish
St. Theresa	St. Theresa-Manton	9475 14 -1/4 Rd, Manton	
St. Joseph	St. Joseph-Onekama	8380 5th St, Onekama	

== West Region ==
Name	Image	Location	Description/notes
Christ the King	Christ the King-Williamsburg	3801 Shore Rd, Acme	
Holy Rosary	Holy Rosary-Cedar	6982 S Schomberg Rd, Cedar	
St. Joseph	Saint Joseph Catholic Church	5899 County Road 669, Cleveland Township	Built 1884; listed on NRHP
Sacred Heart	Sacred Heart-Elk Rapids	143 Charles St, Elk Rapids	
St. Philip Neri	St. Philip Neri-Empire	11411 LaCore Ave, Empire	
St. Mary - Hannah	St. Mary-Hannah -Kingsley	2912 West M-113, Kingsley	
St Mary of the Assumption	St Mary of the Assumption-Lake Leelanau	403 St Mary's St, Lake Leelanau	
St. Rita-St. Joseph	St. Rita-St. Joseph-Maple City	8707 Hill St, Maple City	
St. Gertrude the Great	St. Gertrude the Great-Northport	701 N Warren, Northport	
St. Kateri Tekakwitha Parish		2753 N West Bay Shore Dr, Peshawbestown	
St. Wenceslaus		8500 E Kolarik Rd, Suttons Bay	
Immaculate Conception	Immaculate Conception-Traverse City	308 N Cedar St, Traverse City	
St. Francis of Assisi	St. Francis of Assisi-Traverse City	1025 S Union St, Traverse City	
St. Joseph Catholic	St. Joseph Catholic-Traverse City	12675 Center Rd, Traverse City	
St Patrick	St. Patrick-Traverse City	630 W. Silver Lake Rd S, Traverse City	
