= Brethren High School =

Brethren High School may refer to the following high schools:

- Brethren Christian Junior/Senior High School in Huntington Beach, California
- Brethren High School in Brethren, Michigan
