= Manistee Harbor, South Breakwater =

- U.S. National Register of Historic Places
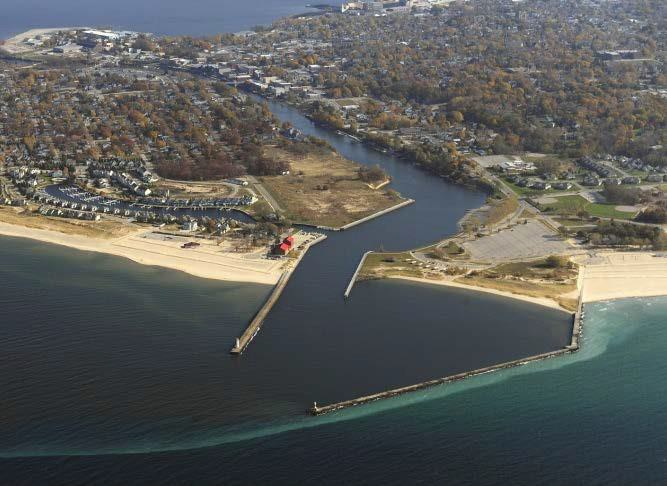
- Manistee Harbor (south breakwater at bottom of photo)

- Location within Michigan Location within the United States
- Interactive map
- Location: Mouth of the Manistee R., at Lake Michigan, Manistee, Michigan
- Coordinates: 44°15′5″N 86°21′0″W
- Area: 1.3 acres (0.53 ha)
- Built: 1913
- Built by: Greiling Brothers Company, John Ginzel
- Architect: United States Army Corps of Engineers
- NRHP reference No.: 95001162
- Added to NRHP: October 20, 1995

The Manistee Harbor, South Breakwater is a navigational structure located at the mouth of the Manistee River (at Lake Michigan), in Manistee, Michigan. It was listed on the National Register of Historic Places in 1995. The breakwater is significant due to its construction, which represents a final stage in the United States Army Corps of Engineers's use of timber crib substructures in pier and breakwater construction.

== History ==
Beginning in the 1840s, the area around lake Manistee began attracting lumber and mill industries. Although the lake offered a fine natural harbor, access from Lake Michigan was limited due to a series of sand bars. To improve access, in 1854 a new channel was cut across the split of land to the west of Lake Manistee, at the location of the present channel. In 1867, legislation was passed allowing the United States Army Corps of Engineers to improve and maintain the channel, including reconstructing the piers at the entryway. The Manistee area remained an important logging and milling center through the rest of the 19th century, and at the beginning of the 20th century, Manistee was producing upwards of 138,000,000 ft of lumber and 28,000,000 shingles per year, most of which was shipped through the harbor.

In 1912, Congress passed the River and Harbor Act, which authorized the U.S. Army Corps of Engineers to start work on a series of improvements at Manistee Harbor. These included a series of dredging projects, the shortening of the south pier, and the construction of a 1300-foot south breakwater, with a shore connection about 1,200 ft long. The Corps of Engineers contracted Greiling Brothers Company to construct the breakwater, and work began in May 1913. A number of cribs were put in place through 1916 and the shore connection was completed in 1917/18 by John Ginzel. The project, including construction of the superstructure, was finally completed in 1920. The wood decking of the superstructure was replaced by concrete in 1933.

== Description ==
The south breakwater at Manistee, Michigan is one of three navigation structures at the mouth of the Manistee harbor which are maintained by the Army Corps of Engineers, the other two being the north and south piers. The south breakwater is 2,485 feet in length, and consists of two substructural components: an outer timber crib breakwater and an inner shore connection. The outer timber crib structure is 1,300 feet long, and consists of a series of timber cribs anchored with timber piles. The shore connection extends for 1,185 feet. and consists of a stone filled causeway substructure formed with walls of overlapped wooden planks and capped with a concrete superstructure.
