= Saint Joseph's Catholic Church (Glen Arbor, Michigan) =

Historic church in Michigan, United States

- U.S. National Register of Historic Places
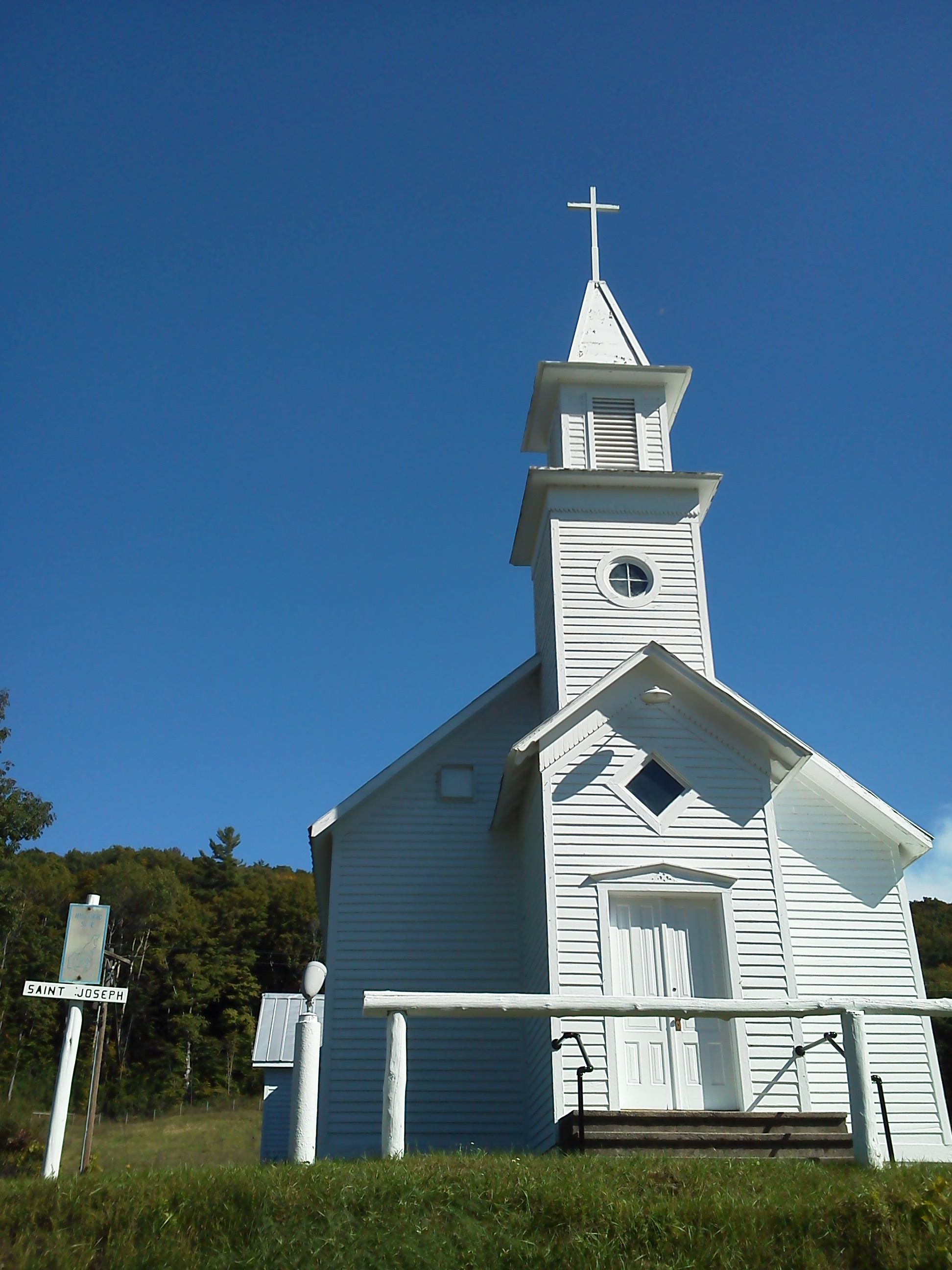

- Location within Michigan Location within the United States
- Interactive map
- Location: 5899 County Road 669, Maple City, Michigan
- Nearest city: Glen Arbor, Michigan
- Coordinates: 44°53′40″N 85°53′0″W
- Area: 1 acre (0.40 ha)
- Built: 1884
- Architectural style: Late 19th-century vernacular
- NRHP reference No.: 91001997
- Added to NRHP: January 22, 1992

Saint Joseph's Catholic Church is a church located at 5899 County Road 669 near Maple City, Michigan and east of Glen Arbor, Michigan. It was constructed in 1884 and listed on the National Register of Historic Places in 1992.

== History ==
In 1853, a group of Bohemian immigrants resettled from Chicago to the area near Good Harbor Bay. The Catholic community were served by itinerant missionary priests several times a year, holding mass in private homes. One of these itinerant priests was Ignatius Mrak, who had established a mission nearby at Peshawbestown. Mrak went on to become Bishop of Sault Sainte Marie and Marquette, succeeding Frederic Baraga. Mrak resigned his post in 1878, and in 1884 returned to the Bohemian community and established a church-building committee. Construction of the church began that year, but the building was not completed until 1886, and was consecrated by Bishop Henry Richter of the newly formed Diocese of Grand Rapids in 1888.

The church remained a mission church throughout its life, never having a resident priest. It was, and still is, the only church in the relatively unpopulated Cleveland Township. A tower and bell were added in 1899, and small additions to the rear were constructed in the 1940s. In 1951, St. Joseph's became a mission of Saint Rita's in nearby Maple City. Saint Joseph's was used by the Catholic congregation until 1970, when the Saint Joseph parish was merged with Staint Rita's. The church is still owned by the parish, and is used twice yearly for mass and occasionally for weddings.

== Description ==
The St. Joseph Catholic Church is a vernacular wood-frame building, covered with clapboards, with a metal-clad gable roof and on a concrete block foundation. A three-part tower, defined by sawtooth-cut, vertical-board frieze bands, is located in the center of one gable. The upper section of the tower contains a belfry topped with a pyramidal roof. At the rear of the church on each side are two small additions dating from the 1940s.

The sides of the church each contain four, pedimented, four-over-four windows. The main door is in the bottom of the tower. Above the door in the gable is a small lozenge-shaped window.

The interior contains a small narthex with tongue-and-groove boarding, a rectangular nave with tray ceiling, and a polygonal apse. The ornate altarpiece is against the back wall of the apse. Varnished wood doors open off either side of the sanctuary. One leads to the confessional, and the other to a closet room for the priest.

== See also ==
- List of churches in the Roman Catholic Diocese of Gaylord
