= Bear Lake Township, Manistee County, Michigan =

Bear Lake Township, Michigan
- Township
- Location within Michigan Location within the United States
- Coordinates: 44°23′52″N 86°8′2″W
- Country: United States
- State: Michigan
- County: Manistee

Area
  - Total: 36.1 sq mi (93 km^{2})
  - Land: 34.7 sq mi (90 km^{2})
  - Water: 1.4 sq mi (3.6 km^{2})
- Elevation: 761 ft (232 m)

Population (2020)
  - Total: 1,831
  - Density: 52.8/sq mi (20.4/km^{2})
- Time zone: UTC-5 (Eastern (EST))
  - Summer (DST): UTC-4 (EDT)
- ZIP codes: 49614 (Bear Lake); 49645 (Kaleva); 49619 (Brethren)
- Area code: 231
- FIPS code: 26-101-06480
- GNIS feature ID: 1625898
- Website: www.bearlaketwp.com

Bear Lake Township is a civil township of Manistee County in the U.S. state of Michigan. As of the 2020 census, the population of the township was 1,831. Within the township is the village of Bear Lake.

== Geography ==
According to the United States Census Bureau, the township has a total area of 36.1 square miles (93 km^{2}), of which 34.7 square miles (90 km^{2}) are land and 1.3 square miles (3.4 km^{2}), or 3.86%, are water. Bear Lake, the water body, is in the northwest part of the township, extending north into Pleasanton Township.

The primary thoroughfare of the township is US Highway 31 (US 31). The highway runs follows a primarily north–south route.

== Demographics ==
As of the census of 2000, there were 1,587 people, 639 households, and 456 families residing in the township. The population density was 45.7 inhabitants per square mile (17.6/km^{2}). There were 916 housing units at an average density of 26.4 per square mile (10.2/km^{2}). The racial makeup of the township was 96.35% White, 0.38% African American, 0.82% Native American, 0.69% Asian, 0.25% Pacific Islander, 0.50% from other races, and 1.01% from two or more races. Hispanic or Latino of any race were 3.72% of the population.

There were 639 households, out of which 28.5% had children under the age of 18 living with them, 61.3% were married couples living together, 6.1% had a female householder with no husband present, and 28.5% were non-families. 24.9% of all households were made up of individuals, and 12.7% had someone living alone who was 65 years of age or older. The average household size was 2.46 and the average family size was 2.90.

In the township the population was spread out, with 24.8% under the age of 18, 5.7% from 18 to 24, 26.5% from 25 to 44, 25.9% from 45 to 64, and 17.1% who were 65 years of age or older. The median age was 41 years. For every 100 females, there were 101.4 males. For every 100 females age 18 and over, there were 98.8 males.

The median income for a household in the township was $37,898, and the median income for a family was $41,875. Males had a median income of $35,114 versus $21,848 for females. The per capita income for the township was $18,186. About 6.1% of families and 8.2% of the population were below the poverty line, including 12.2% of those under age 18 and 11.3% of those age 65 or over.
