= Manistee Iron Works =

- Manistee Iron Works Machine Shop
- U.S. National Register of Historic Places
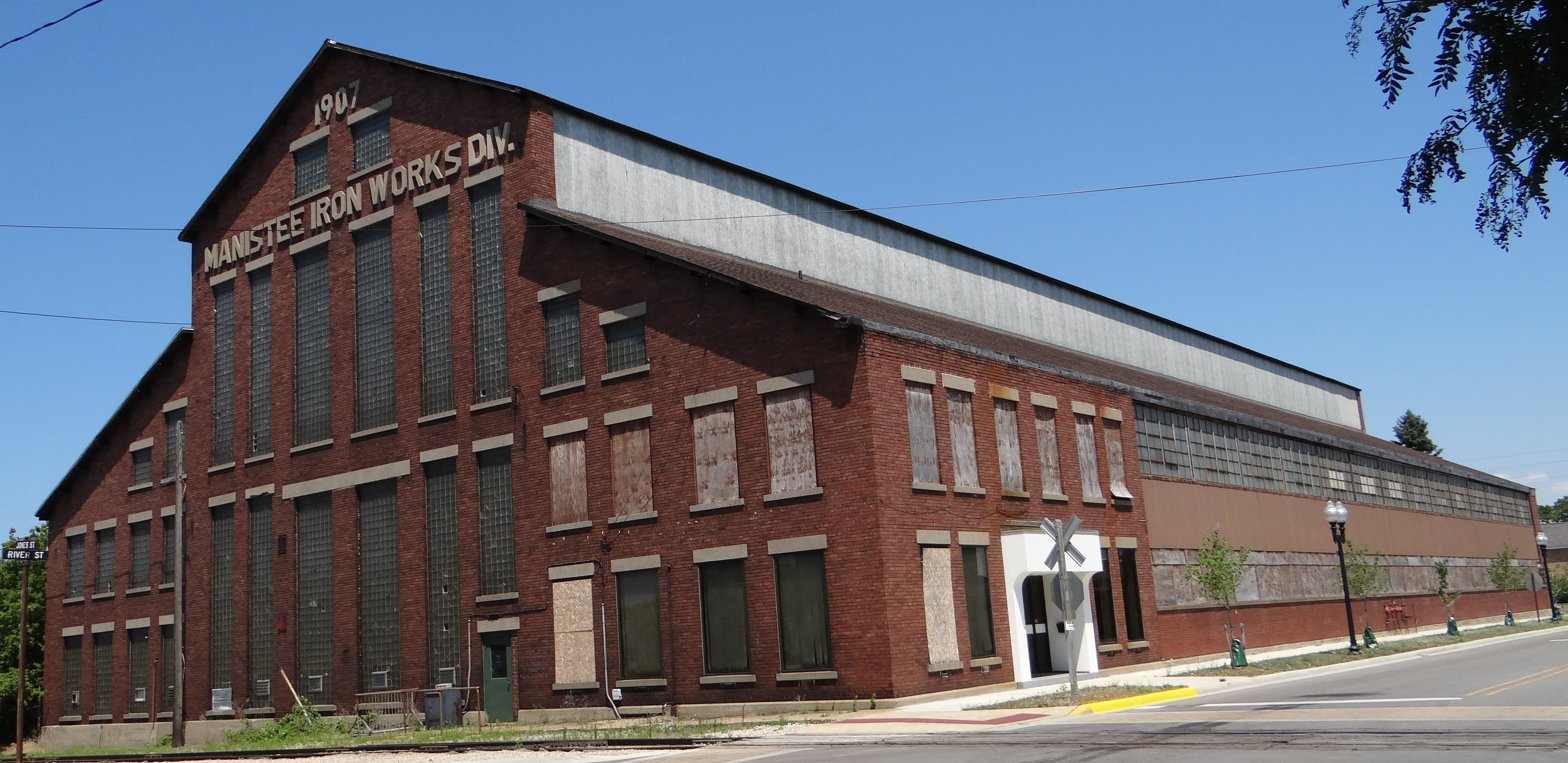
- Manistee Iron Works, July 2012

- Location within Michigan Location within the United States
- Interactive map of Manistee Iron Works Machine Shop
- Location: 254 River St., Manistee, Michigan
- Coordinates: 44°15′01″N 86°18′59″W
- Built: 1906
- NRHP reference No.: 10000477
- Added to NRHP: July 19, 2010

The Manistee Iron Works, also known as the Excello factory, was a manufacturing company based in Manistee, Michigan. While the company has since gone out of business, the factory built by the company in 1907 continues to bear the company's name and is a landmark in Manistee's historic downtown area. The building was listed on the National Register of Historic Places in 2010.

== History ==
The Manistee Iron Works was founded in the 1870s as a foundry and machine shop. In the late 1880s, the facility began manufacturing heavy machinery, including pumps and evaporation pans, for the area's burgeoning salt industry.

A prior structure was destroyed by fire in July 1901. At the time of the fire, The Ludington Chronicle reported that the iron works was "one of Manistee's best industries and was doing a very large business."

In 1904, the Manistee Iron Works was contracted to manufacture "a complete salt-making plant" for an English company. The order, running into the hundreds of thousands of dollars, was reported at the time to be "perhaps the largest order placed by a single English concern for goods of American manufacture."

In 1907, the plant that remains today was built at the northeast corner of Jones and River Streets. The rectangular 2 1/2-story brick foundry building remains a Manistee landmark. It is 120 feet wide and 270 feet long with a gabled roof.

During the 1930s, workers at the facility participated in the Manistee Iron Works Band, which performed in area parades and events.

In June 1947, a fire substantially damaged the main foundry structure. A second fire in January 1948 destroyed the parts foundry at the site.

The plant ceased operations in 1981. The State of Michigan designated the property as a brownfield redevelopment project in April 2003. The designation was intended to assist in providing funding to clean up heavy metal and other contamination at the site and to promote redevelopment efforts. The property was also included in Manistee's tax-free Renaissance Zone.

In 2010, the machine shop at the Manistee Iron Works was listed on the National Register of Historic Places. In the late 2000s, the facility was occupied by 10 West Studios, a motion picture production company. In 2009, 10 West produced the film "What If...?" at various Manistee locations, including the iron works.

== Description ==
The Manistee Iron Works Machine Shop is a rectangular building measuring 260 feet by 120 feet. It has a gable roof with a tall, broad, gabled rooftop monitor at the peak, so that the entire structure is seventy feet high. The building has a steel frame divided into three sections, with a broad central section flanked by two lower, narrower sections on either side. The front and rear facades are constructed of dark red brick, and the south corner originally housed a two-story office area, with an entry on the southeast side.

== See also ==
- National Register of Historic Places listings in Manistee County, Michigan
