= Manistee Pierhead lights =

Lighthouses in Michigan, United States

North Pierhead Light
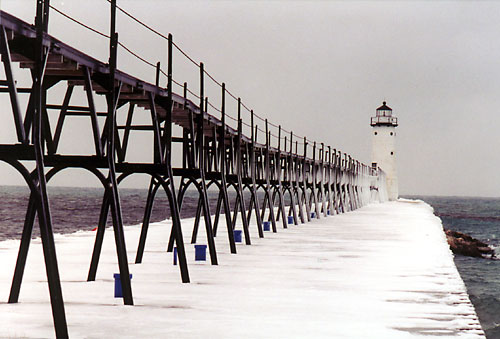
- Manistee Breakwater Lighthouse
- Location: Manistee, Michigan at the mouth of the Manistee River
- Coordinates: 44.2517°N 86.3464°W

Tower
- Constructed: 1870
- Foundation: pier
- Construction: Cast Iron
- Automated: 1927
- Height: 39 feet (12 m)
- Shape: cylindrical
- Markings: white with black lantern
- Heritage: National Register of Historic Places listed place
- Fog signal: HORN: 1 blast every 15s (2s bl) Operates from April 1 to November 1

Light
- First lit: 1870
- Focal height: 55 feet (17 m)
- Lens: fifth order Fresnel Lens (original), 12-inch (300 mm) Tideland Signal ML-300 Acrylic Optic (current)
- Intensity: 5000 candlepower
- Range: 15 nautical miles (28 km; 17 mi)
- Characteristic: Iso W 6s
- Manistee North Pier
- U.S. National Register of Historic Places
- NRHP reference No.: 90000718

The Manistee Pierhead lights are a pair of active aids to navigation located on the north and south pier in the harbor of Manistee, Michigan, "Lake Michigan’s Victorian Port City."

== History ==
The first light was on the south pier in 1870. Unfortunately, it burnt in the Great Fire of 1871, October 8, 1871, along with the town of Manistee. Coincidentally, Manistee burnt on the same day as the Great Chicago Fire, Peshtigo Fire in Wisconsin, and fires in Port Huron and Holland, Michigan.

Two lighthouses were built, one on each pier in 1875. Over the years the lights have been moved several times, including moves to and from the mainland, and to and from the south to the north pier. Lights have been torn down and rebuilt.

The current tower is located on the north pier. It is constructed of cast iron, and was first listed in 1927. The tower is a white cylinder, and the keeper's house is separate. The original lens was a Fifth Order Fresnel lens. The tower has also been rebuilt as the pier has been extended. Other changes have involved the placement and configuration of the fog horn. The present tower is 39 feet (12 m) tall. The catwalk is one of only four that survive in the State of Michigan. National Register of Historic Places, Reference # 90000718 The tower is capped with a ten-sided steel lantern. The light uses a 5,000 candlepower incandescent electric bulb, and has a flashing mechanism which displays "a group occulting white light" over 30 seconds. Its focal plane is 55 feet (17 m), and is visible for 12 nautical miles (22 km; 14 mi) in clear weather. The "Type C" diaphone is powered by an electric compressor housed in the tower, and emits a group of three blasts every 30 seconds. There is also a radio beacon.

The northern pier light is located on the same side of the river as the Manistee Coast Guard station, and within shouting distance of the Manistee South pier light.

The south pier has a 37-foot (11 m) steel tower navigational aid. This was constructed when the lighthouse was moved to the north pier in 1927.

Manistee Pierhead Light was put up for sale under the National Historic Lighthouse Preservation Act in 2009. On June 30, 2011, ownership of the light was transferred to the City of Manistee. The Manistee County Historical Museum will maintain the light.

== Directions ==
From US 31 go 1.5 miles (2.4 km) west on Memorial Drive, to the Fifth Ave. Beach and Park.

== See also ==
- Lighthouses in the United States
