= Manistee Fire Station =

- U.S. National Register of Historic Places
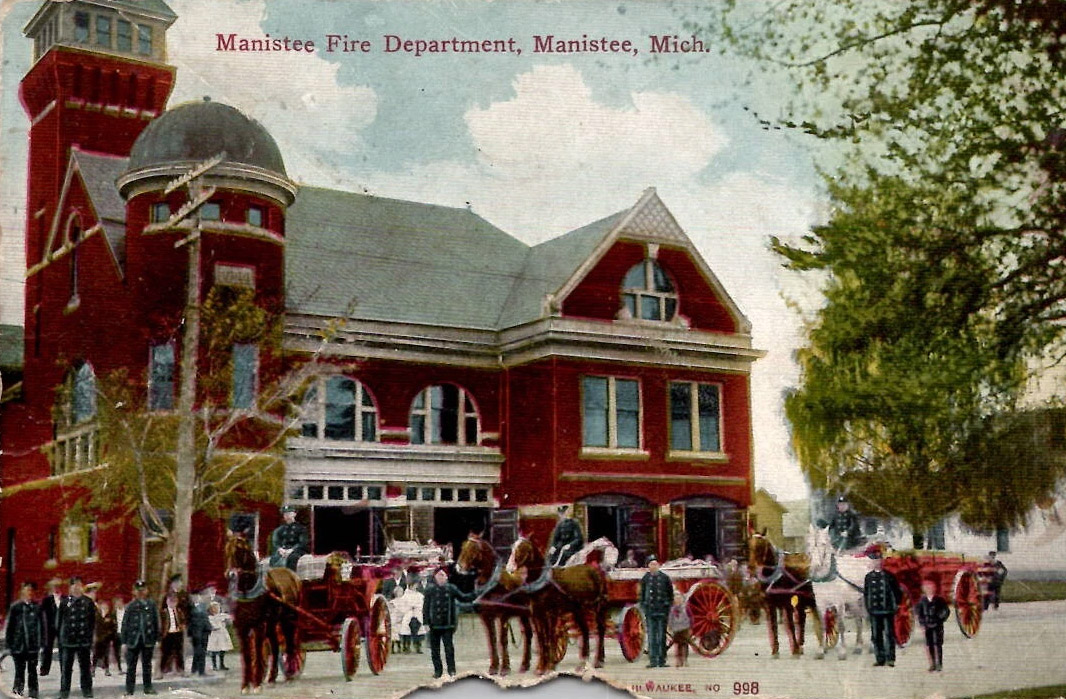
- Manistee Fire Station c. 1913

- Location within Michigan Location within the United States
- Interactive map
- Location: 281 First St., Manistee, Michigan
- Coordinates: 44°14′14″N 86°19′00″W
- Area: less than 1 acre
- Built: 1889
- Built by: Brownrigg & Reynolds
- Architect: Frederick W. Hollister
- Architectural style: Late Victorian, Romanesque Revival
- NRHP reference No.: 100012565
- Added to NRHP: January 20, 2026

The Manistee Fire Station is a fire station located at 281 First Street in Manistee, Michigan. It was listed on the National Register of Historic Places in 2026. In 2019, the station was recognized by the Guinness Book of World Records as the oldest continuously manned fire station in the world.

== History ==
The first sawmill in Manistee was established in 1841. The village grew quickly, both in population and in geographical size, over the next few decades. In 1869, it was incorporated as a city and the Manistee Fire Department was established. However, in 1871, a catastrophic fire swept through the city, destroying roughly half of the buildings. The city rebuilt, and in 1873 established a small carriage house for the fire department. However, as the population continued to grow, the city decided that a large centralized fire house was necessary.

In 1888, the city purchased land for the construction of a new fire station. Saginaw architect Frederick W. Hollister was hired to design the new building. The firm of Brownrigg & Reynolds was contracted to construct the new station, which opened in June 1889. The fire station was originally designed to accommodate horse-drawn fire equipment, and had provisions for horse stalls, water, hay supply, and a blacksmith bench.

As the fire station moved into the 20th century, it transitioned from horse-drawn to motorized equipment. The first motorized fire engine was purchased in 1917, and by 1921 all fire equipment was motorized. The earliest pieces of motorized equipment were all chain driven, and it was not until 1949 that the department purchased a shaft-driven Mack fire engine. This Mack engine was used by the department for almost 50 years, until 1996.

The building itself received some minor refurbishments over time. A large arched window was filled with glass block, the original carriage doors were replaced with overhead doors, and a projecting wooden bay on the second floor was removed. In 1995/96, the garage door openings were increased in height to accommodate new equipment. The station continues to serve Manistee, and in 2019 was recognized as the oldest continuously manned fire station in the world.

== Description ==
The Manistee Fire Station is a two-and-a-half story Romanesque Revival side gable building faced with brick. It sits on a rubblestone foundation and has an asphalt shingle roof. The exterior has ashlar details. The roofline is defined by several gables and two towers: a dome-topped circular tower in one corner and a taller square tower, historically used as a lookout and hose drying tower.

The primary elevation of the building has four apparatus bays with segmentally arched openings on the first floor. Two of these bays project forward and are topped with a gable. Above each first floor opening is a second floor window opening with a stone sill. To the side, balancing the projecting bays, is the projecting circular tower. The tower contains the main entrance on the first floor, and is topped with a copper clad dome.
