= Dickson Township, Michigan =

- Township
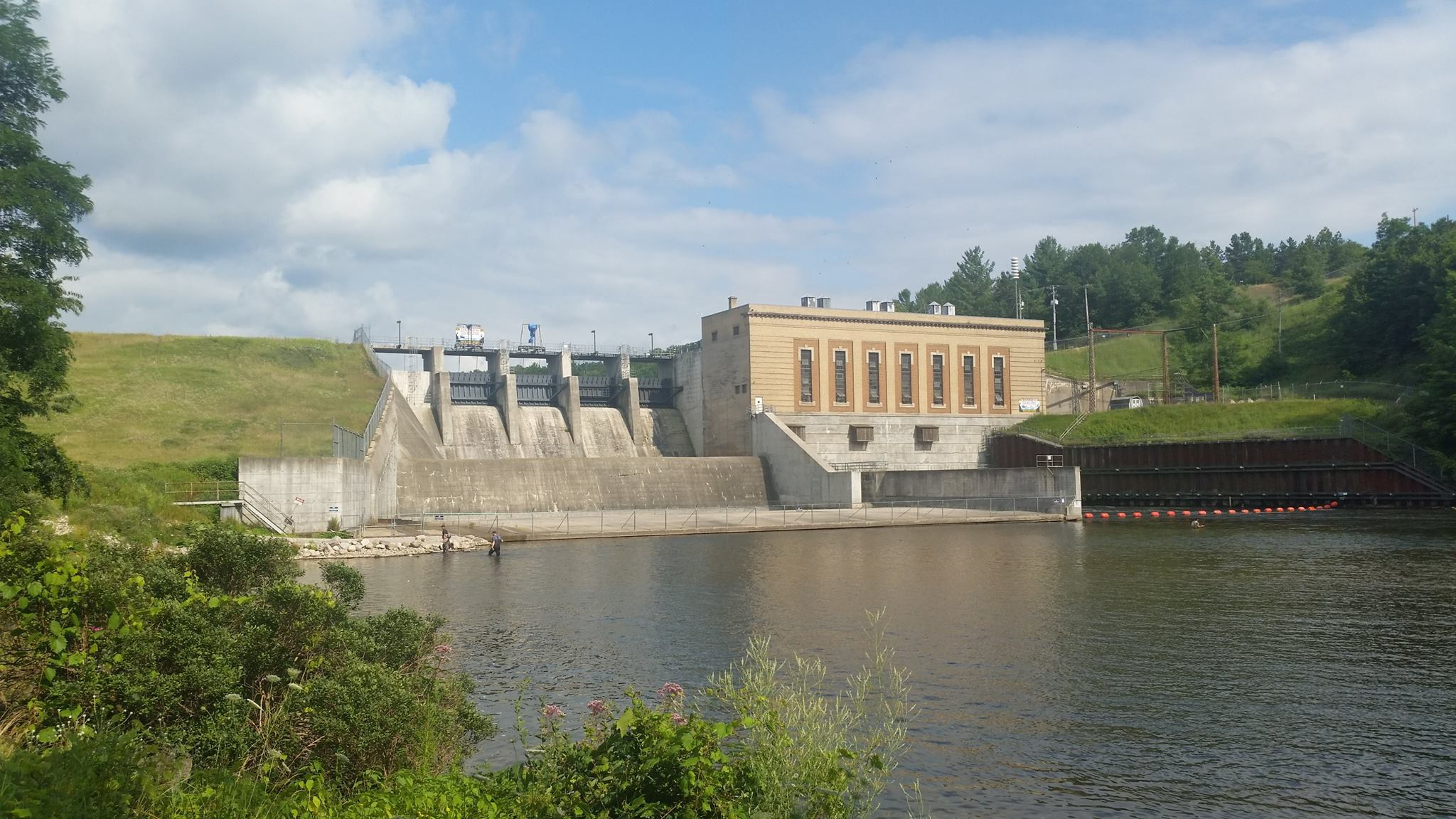
- Tippy Dam on the Manistee River

- Location within Michigan Location within the United States
- Coordinates: 44°17′57″N 85°56′46″W
- Country: United States
- State: Michigan
- County: Manistee

Area
  - Total: 71.5 sq mi (185 km^{2})
  - Land: 69.5 sq mi (180 km^{2})
  - Water: 2.0 sq mi (5.2 km^{2})
- Elevation: 860 ft (262 m)

Population (2020)
  - Total: 980
  - Density: 14.1/sq mi (5.4/km^{2})
- Time zone: UTC-5 (Eastern (EST))
  - Summer (DST): UTC-4 (EDT)
- ZIP Codes: 49619 (Brethren); 49645 (Kaleva); 49625 (Copemish); 49638 (Harrietta); 49689 (Wellston)
- FIPS code: 26-101-22320
- GNIS feature ID: 1626185
- Website: https://www.dicksontownship.org/

Dickson Township is a civil township of Manistee County in the U.S. state of Michigan. The population was 980 at the 2020 census.

Most of the township lies within the Manistee National Forest. The Manistee River runs through the eastern and southern portions, with the Tippy Dam forming the Tippy Dam Pond along the south-central boundary.

== Communities ==
- Brethren, former home to actor James Earl Jones and his maternal grandparents, is an unincorporated community in the township, situated about 15 miles (24 km) east of Manistee in the Manistee National Forest at 44°18′16″N 86°01′08″W. The main roads of the community are High Bridge Road (north-south) and Coates Highway (east-west; known as Brethren Boulevard in town). Brethren was founded in 1900 by Samuel S. Thorpe as a colony of the German Baptist Brethren Church. A post office was established in 1901 with Thorpe as the first postmaster. The office continues to serve ZIP code 49619. The Pere Marquette Railway established a station here in 1901.

== Geography ==
According to the United States Census Bureau, the township has a total area of 71.5 square miles (185 km^{2}), of which 69.5 square miles (180 km^{2}) are land and 2.0 square miles (5.2 km^{2}), or 2.81%, are water.

== Demographics ==
As of the census of 2000, there were 929 people, 364 households, and 259 families residing in the township. The population density was 13.3 inhabitants per square mile (5.1/km^{2}). There were 660 housing units at an average density of 9.4 per square mile (3.6/km^{2}). The racial makeup of the township was 96.88% White, 0.22% African American, 1.08% Native American, 0.11% Asian, and 1.72% from two or more races. Hispanic or Latino of any race were 2.05% of the population.

There were 364 households, out of which 27.2% had children under the age of 18 living with them, 57.7% were married couples living together, 10.2% had a female householder with no husband present, and 28.6% were non-families. 22.3% of all households were made up of individuals, and 6.9% had someone living alone who was 65 years of age or older. The average household size was 2.55 and the average family size was 2.93.

In the township the population was spread out, with 24.2% under the age of 18, 5.6% from 18 to 24, 24.2% from 25 to 44, 30.1% from 45 to 64, and 15.8% who were 65 years of age or older. The median age was 42 years. For every 100 females, there were 103.3 males. For every 100 females age 18 and over, there were 104.7 males.

The median income for a household in the township was $33,309, and the median income for a family was $34,545. Males had a median income of $27,656 versus $20,781 for females. The per capita income for the township was $15,479. About 8.3% of families and 10.2% of the population were below the poverty line, including 11.8% of those under age 18 and 10.3% of those age 65 or over.
