= Guardian Angels Church (Manistee, Michigan) =

Historic church in Michigan, United States

- U.S. National Register of Historic Places
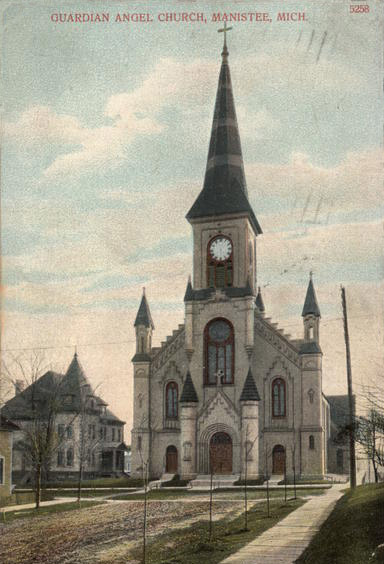
- Guardian Angels Church c. 1908

- Location within Michigan Location within the United States
- Interactive map
- Location: 371-375 Fifth St., Manistee, Michigan
- Coordinates: 44°14′31″N 86°19′20″W
- Area: less than 1 acre
- Built: 1888
- Built by: Noud and Kenny
- Architect: Adolphus Druiding
- Architectural style: Late Victorian, Gothic Revival
- NRHP reference No.: 100005180
- Added to NRHP: April 14, 2020

Guardian Angels Church is a Roman Catholic church located at 371-375 Fifth Street in Manistee, Michigan. It was listed on the National Register of Historic Places in 2020. Along with St. Joseph Church, Guardian Angels Church is part of Divine Mercy Parish in the Diocese of Gaylord.

== History ==
The first Catholic church in Manistee, Saint Mary, was constructed in 1862. In the 1870s and 1880s, both mining and timber industries ramped up productions, bringing a wave of new residents to Manistee. Many of these were Catholic immigrants from France, Ireland, Germany, and Poland, and soon the Saint Mary Church was running low on space. In addition, the ethnic tensions then current in Europe were imported to the new world, and Manistee's Catholic congregation became frayed. In 1884, the Polish population opened their own parish, Saint Joseph. This eased the space issues, but led the German and Irish immigrants to petition for their own parish as well. This new church, the Guardian Angel church, was commissioned in 1888. Father Herman Grimme was assigned as pastor.

Money was raised in the summer of 1888 for the new church, and Adolphus Druiding, who had a reputation as a designer of modest Midwestern churches, was hired to design the church. The firm of Noud and Kenny was contracted for construction, and work began in August 1888. Bishop Richter of the Roman Catholic Diocese of Grand Rapids laid the cornerstone in September. The exterior work continued quickly, and was substantially complete by January 1889. Much of the interior was done by May, but the church was not dedicated until December 1890.

However, Father Herman Grimme succumbed to typhoid fever in 1891. He was succeeded by Father J.M. Steffes, who stayed with the parish for the next forty-six years. By 1899, the parish had over 800 parishioners. Because of this growth, a three-story schoolhouse was constructed in 1892–93, and a Sisters of Mercy convent next door was constructed in 1903. A rectory was added in 1907. By the 1920s, Guardian Angels school had 150 to 200 students.

== Description ==
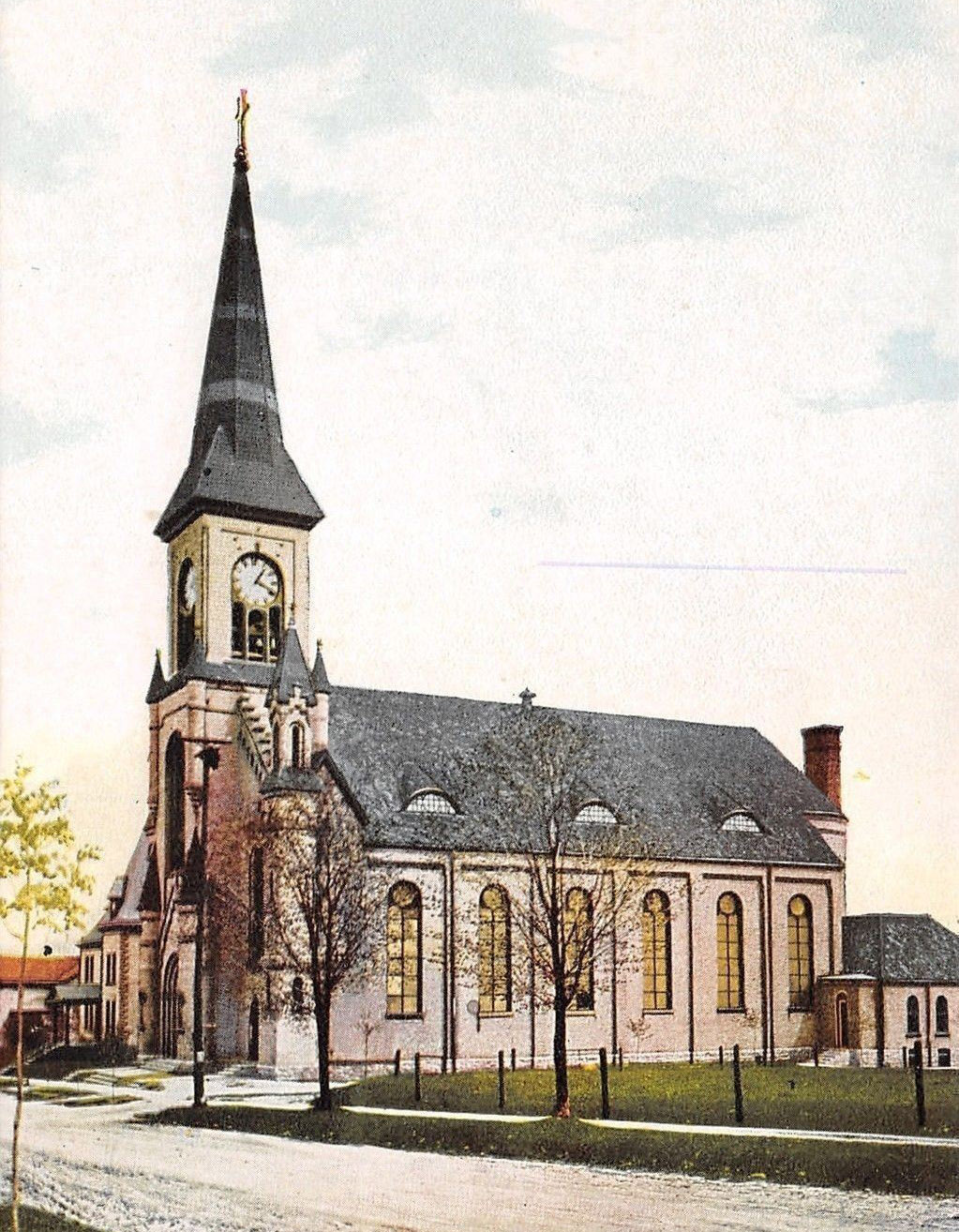
Guardian Angel Church c. 1906

Guardian Angels Church is a Gothic Revival brick structure. The brickwork is highly decorative, and contains multiple patterns, banding, and corbelling. The main façade is dominated by a large centrally located bell tower, which at 180 feet is the tallest structure in Manistee. The tower contains an integrated four-sided clock and a large rose window. It is topped with a shingled steeple and a fourteen-foot white cross. The bell tower is flanked by stepped parapets on which are square turrets with open galleries. At the bottom of the tower is a front entrance consisting of two eight-foot-tall wooden doors. Two additional single doors flank the central entrance. Above these are symmetrical stained glass windows. All window and door entrances feature a round arch top.

The church is built in basilica form, and contains a high altar at one end surrounded by a large rounded apse. The nave seats four hundred fifty people. There are six large stained glass windows along either side of the sanctuary, and six stained glass windows behind eyebrow windows above the nave. A balcony is located at the rear, and originally provided seating space for an additional two hundred persons, It was converted to house a 1910 Henry Reinisch pipe organ in a quarter sawn oak encasement.

== See also ==
- List of churches in the Roman Catholic Diocese of Gaylord
