= Maple City, Michigan =

- Census-designated place (CDP) & unincorporated community
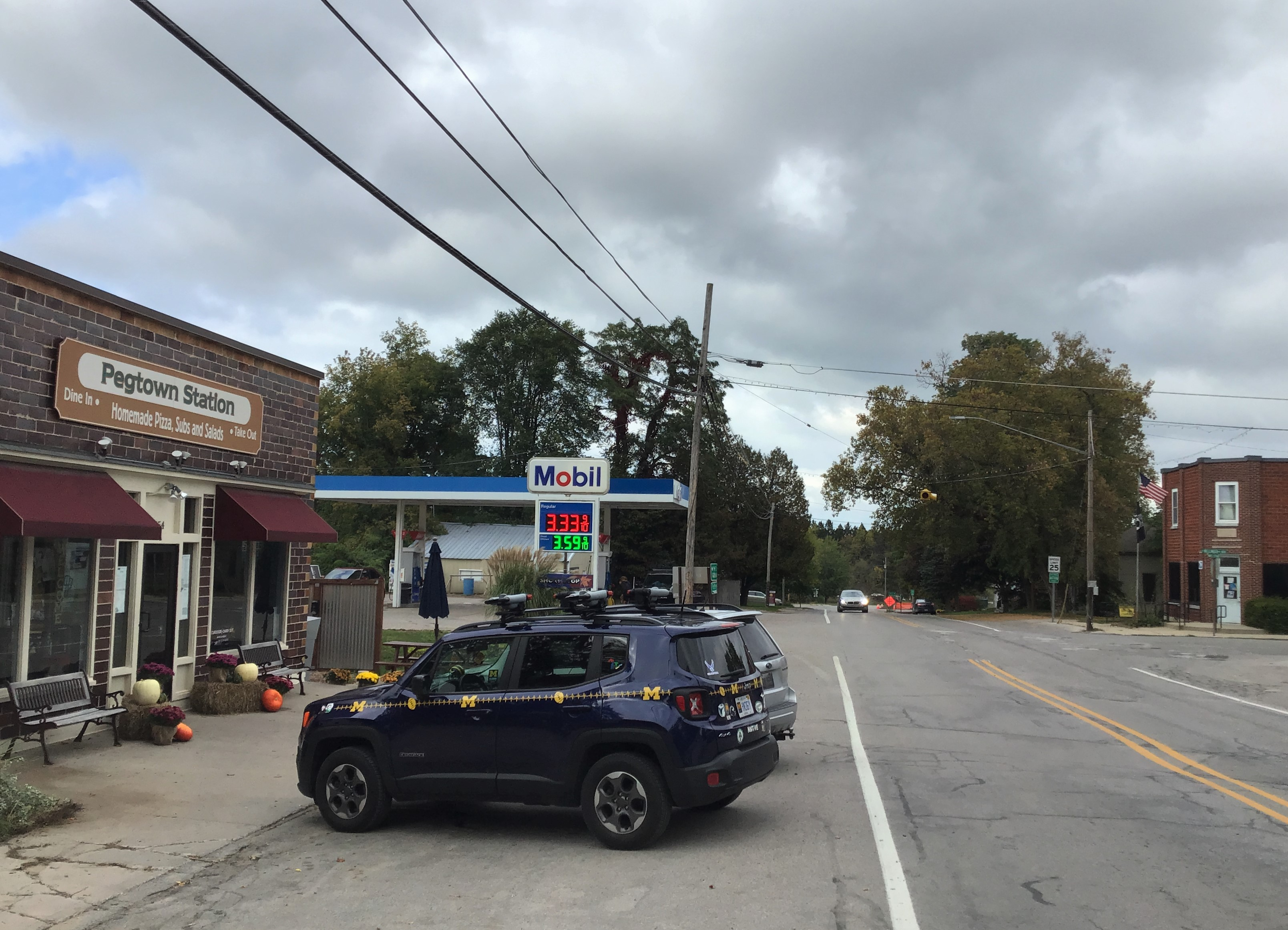
- Maple City in 2021

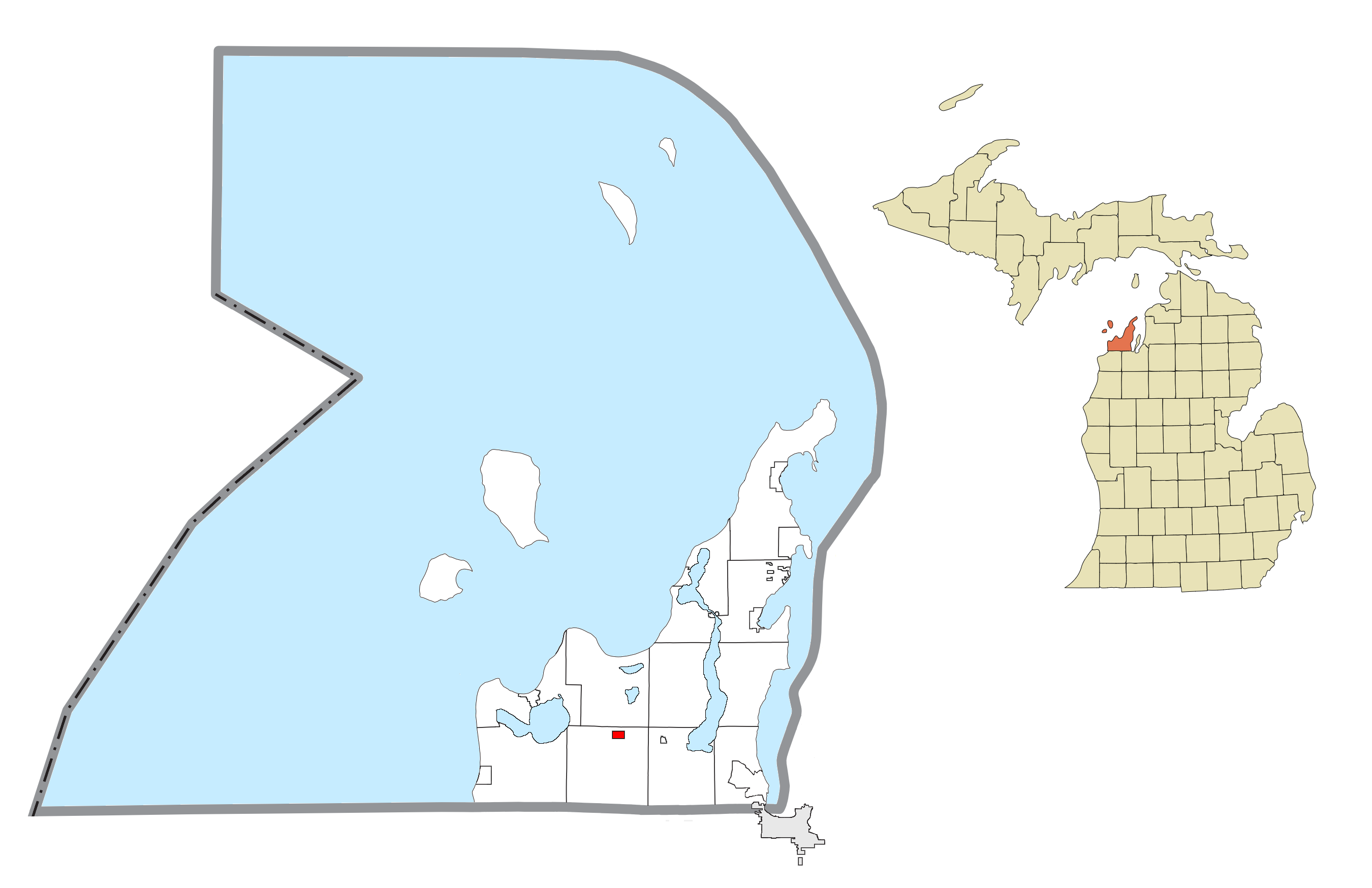
- Location within Leelanau County

- Location within the state of Michigan Location within the United States
- Coordinates: 44°51′20″N 85°51′21″W
- Country: United States
- State: Michigan
- County: Leelanau
- Township: Kasson

Area
  - Total: 0.43 sq mi (1.12 km^{2})
  - Land: 0.43 sq mi (1.12 km^{2})
  - Water: 0 sq mi (0.00 km^{2})
- Elevation: 705 ft (215 m)

Population (2020)
  - Total: 209
  - Density: 482.4/sq mi (186.27/km^{2})
- Time zone: UTC-5 (Eastern (EST))
  - Summer (DST): UTC-4 (EDT)
- ZIP code(s): 49664
- Area code: 231
- GNIS feature ID: 631423

Maple City is an unincorporated community and census-designated place in Leelanau County, in the U.S. state of Michigan. The population of Maple City was 209 at the 2020 census. The community is located within Kasson Township, and lies about 13 miles (21 km) northwest of Traverse City.

As an unincorporated community, Maple City holds no legal autonomy of its own, and relies on governance from Kasson Township. However, a post office operates out of Maple City, with the ZIP code 49664.

Historical population
Census	Pop.	Note	%±
2010	207		—
2020	209		1.0%
U.S. Decennial Census

== History ==
Maple City had its beginnings in 1866 when William Parks and J. T. Sturtevant built a shoe peg factory on land containing several hundred acres of maple timber, and the community that grew up around it was at first known as "Peg Town." When applying for a post office, the name "Maple" was chosen, and when the post office was established on March 9, 1875, the name was given as "Maple City." William H. Crowell, who had purchased the shoe peg factory in that year, was the first postmaster. The factory burned down in 1880, and in 1882, Crowell built a sawmill that operated until 1916.

== Climate ==
Climate data for Maple City 1E, Michigan (1991–2020 normals, extremes 1959–present)
Month	Jan	Feb	Mar	Apr	May	Jun	Jul	Aug	Sep	Oct	Nov	Dec	Year
Record high °F (°C)	55 (13)	70 (21)	85 (29)	90 (32)	93 (34)	98 (37)	102 (39)	98 (37)	96 (36)	88 (31)	77 (25)	65 (18)	102 (39)
Mean daily maximum °F (°C)	28.7 (−1.8)	31.0 (−0.6)	40.8 (4.9)	52.9 (11.6)	66.8 (19.3)	75.6 (24.2)	79.9 (26.6)	78.3 (25.7)	71.0 (21.7)	58.3 (14.6)	44.7 (7.1)	34.1 (1.2)	55.2 (12.9)
Daily mean °F (°C)	22.3 (−5.4)	23.3 (−4.8)	31.2 (−0.4)	42.0 (5.6)	54.2 (12.3)	63.6 (17.6)	68.6 (20.3)	67.6 (19.8)	60.6 (15.9)	49.2 (9.6)	37.5 (3.1)	28.2 (−2.1)	45.7 (7.6)
Mean daily minimum °F (°C)	15.9 (−8.9)	15.7 (−9.1)	21.6 (−5.8)	31.1 (−0.5)	41.7 (5.4)	51.5 (10.8)	57.4 (14.1)	57.0 (13.9)	50.1 (10.1)	40.0 (4.4)	30.3 (−0.9)	22.2 (−5.4)	36.2 (2.3)
Record low °F (°C)	−14 (−26)	−24 (−31)	−20 (−29)	7 (−14)	17 (−8)	25 (−4)	34 (1)	35 (2)	21 (−6)	19 (−7)	2 (−17)	−12 (−24)	−24 (−31)
Average precipitation inches (mm)	2.76 (70)	1.89 (48)	1.97 (50)	2.92 (74)	3.09 (78)	2.94 (75)	2.71 (69)	2.94 (75)	4.08 (104)	4.46 (113)	3.24 (82)	2.67 (68)	35.67 (906)
Average snowfall inches (cm)	44.5 (113)	27.5 (70)	14.3 (36)	6.4 (16)	0.2 (0.51)	0.0 (0.0)	0.0 (0.0)	0.0 (0.0)	0.0 (0.0)	0.5 (1.3)	13.9 (35)	36.0 (91)	143.3 (364)
Average precipitation days (≥ 0.01 in)	18.6	13.2	10.0	10.1	11.1	8.7	8.6	7.9	10.5	13.2	14.6	16.3	142.8
Average snowy days (≥ 0.1 in)	17.3	12.1	7.0	4.0	0.4	0.0	0.0	0.0	0.0	1.1	7.4	14.1	63.4
Source: NOAA

== Demographics ==
White (Non-Hispanic) (82.6%), White (Hispanic) (11.6%), Asian (Hispanic) (4.65%), American Indian & Alaska Native, (Non-Hispanic) (1.16%), and Black or African American (Non-Hispanic) (0%) make up Maple City, Michigan's 5 largest ethnic groupings.

== Sources ==
- Romig, Walter (October 1, 1986) [1973]. Michigan Place Names: The History of the Founding and the Naming of More Than Five Thousand Past and Present Michigan Communities (Paperback). Great Lakes Books Series. Detroit, Michigan: Wayne State University Press. ISBN 978-0-8143-1838-6.
