= Pleasanton Township, Michigan =

- Township
- Location within Michigan Location within the United States
- Coordinates: 44°28′1″N 86°7′50″W
- Country: United States
- State: Michigan
- County: Manistee

Area
  - Total: 35.4 sq mi (92 km^{2})
  - Land: 33.5 sq mi (87 km^{2})
  - Water: 1.9 sq mi (4.9 km^{2})
- Elevation: 896 ft (273 m)

Population (2020)
  - Total: 870
  - Density: 25.9/sq mi (10.0/km^{2})
- Time zone: UTC-5 (Eastern (EST))
  - Summer (DST): UTC-4 (EDT)
- ZIP Codes: 49614 (Bear Lake); 49683 (Thompsonville)
- FIPS code: 26-101-64860
- GNIS feature ID: 1626915
- Website: pleasantontownship.org

Pleasanton Township is a civil township of Manistee County in the U.S. state of Michigan. The population was 870 at the 2020 census.

== Geography ==
The township is in northern Manistee County and is bordered to the north by Benzie County. According to the United States Census Bureau, the township has a total area of 35.4 square miles (92 km^{2}), of which 33.5 square miles (87 km^{2}) are land and 1.9 square miles (4.9 km^{2}), or 5.36%, are water. Bear Lake is on the southern border of the township.

== Demographics ==
As of the census of 2000, there were 817 people, 344 households, and 249 families residing in the township. The population density was 24.3 per square mile (9.4/km^{2}). There were 623 housing units at an average density of 18.6 per square mile (7.2/km^{2}). The racial makeup of the township was 99.02% White, 0.12% Native American, 0.12% from other races, and 0.73% from two or more races. Hispanic or Latino of any race were 1.96% of the population.

There were 344 households, out of which 23.5% had children under the age of 18 living with them, 59.9% were married couples living together, 7.8% had a female householder with no husband present, and 27.6% were non-families. 23.3% of all households were made up of individuals, and 13.1% had someone living alone who was 65 years of age or older. The average household size was 2.35 and the average family size was 2.72.

In the township, the population was spread out, with 23.5% under the age of 18, 4.9% from 18 to 24, 24.4% from 25 to 44, 23.4% from 45 to 64, and 23.9% who were 65 years of age or older. The median age was 43 years. For every 100 females, there were 98.8 males. For every 100 females age 18 and over, there were 94.7 males.

The median income for a household in the township was $33,977, and the median income for a family was $36,406. Males had a median income of $30,313 versus $21,000 for females. The per capita income for the township was $15,450. About 10.8% of families and 12.4% of the population were below the poverty line, including 20.1% of those under age 18 and 5.8% of those age 65 or over.
