= Manistee County Courthouse Fountain =

- U.S. National Register of Historic Places
- Michigan State Historic Site
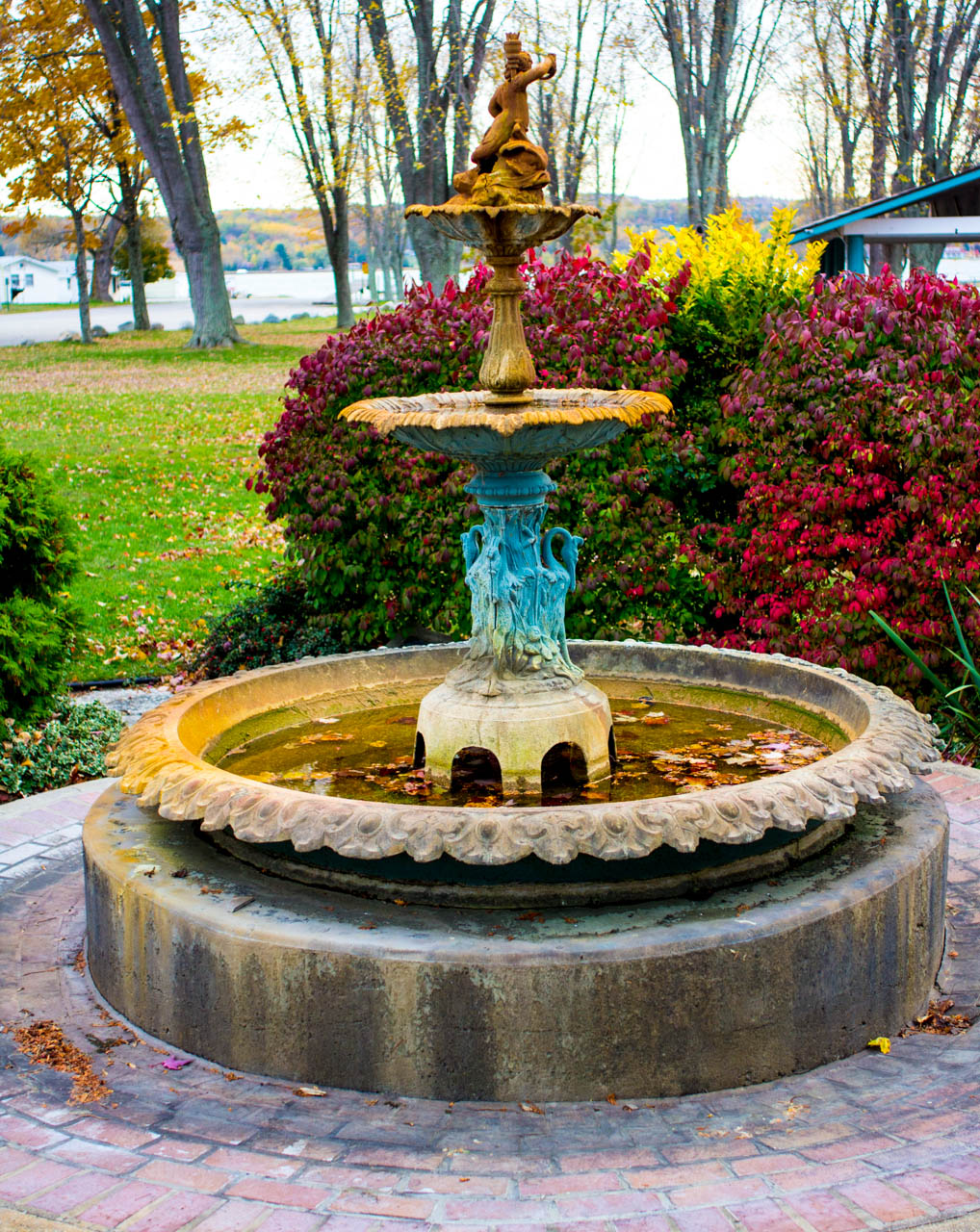

- Location within Michigan Location within the United States
- Interactive map
- Location: Onekama Village Park, Onekama, Michigan
- Coordinates: 44°21′48″N 86°12′23″W
- Area: less than one acre
- Built: 1887
- Architectural style: Late Victorian
- NRHP reference No.: 88000065
- Added to NRHP: February 8, 1988

The Manistee County Courthouse Fountain, also known as the Memorial Fountain, is a decorative fountain located in the Onekama Village Park in Onekama, Michigan. It was added to the National Register of Historic Places in 1988.

== History ==
In 1878, a Victorian Gothic county courthouse was constructed on Third Street in Manistee, Michigan. In 1887 two fountains were placed on the courthouse grounds, to each side and slightly in front of the courthouse itself. These fountains remained in place until 1950, when the courthouse was destroyed by fire. At that time, the Portage Lake Garden Club, a civic improvement club located in Onekama, accepted one of the fountains to be placed in the Onekama Village Park. It is possible that this fountain was actually constructed from pieces of the two, as only a few fragments of the "other" fountain exist.

The fountain was installed in Onekama in July 1950, and landscaping added around it. It was dedicated in August 1951. In 1974, as a result of damage to the fountain, it was removed, repaired, and reinstalled.

== Description ==
The Memorial Fountain is an ornamental fountain made of cast iron, standing on a concrete base and topped with a lead statue of a merman riding a dolphin and blowing a horn. The entire fountain is 77 inches high and 88 inches wide. It is constructed in three tiers, with a wide lower basin at the bottom, a pedestal supporting a central basin in the middle, and a second pedestal supporting the upper basin an merman statue at the top. An inscription, "Patented April 11, 1871" appears on the surface of the fountain. The basins are decorated with designs featuring storks, cat-o'-nine tails, lilly leaves, and flowers, as well as acanthus, flute, and scallop designs.
