= Tippy Dam =

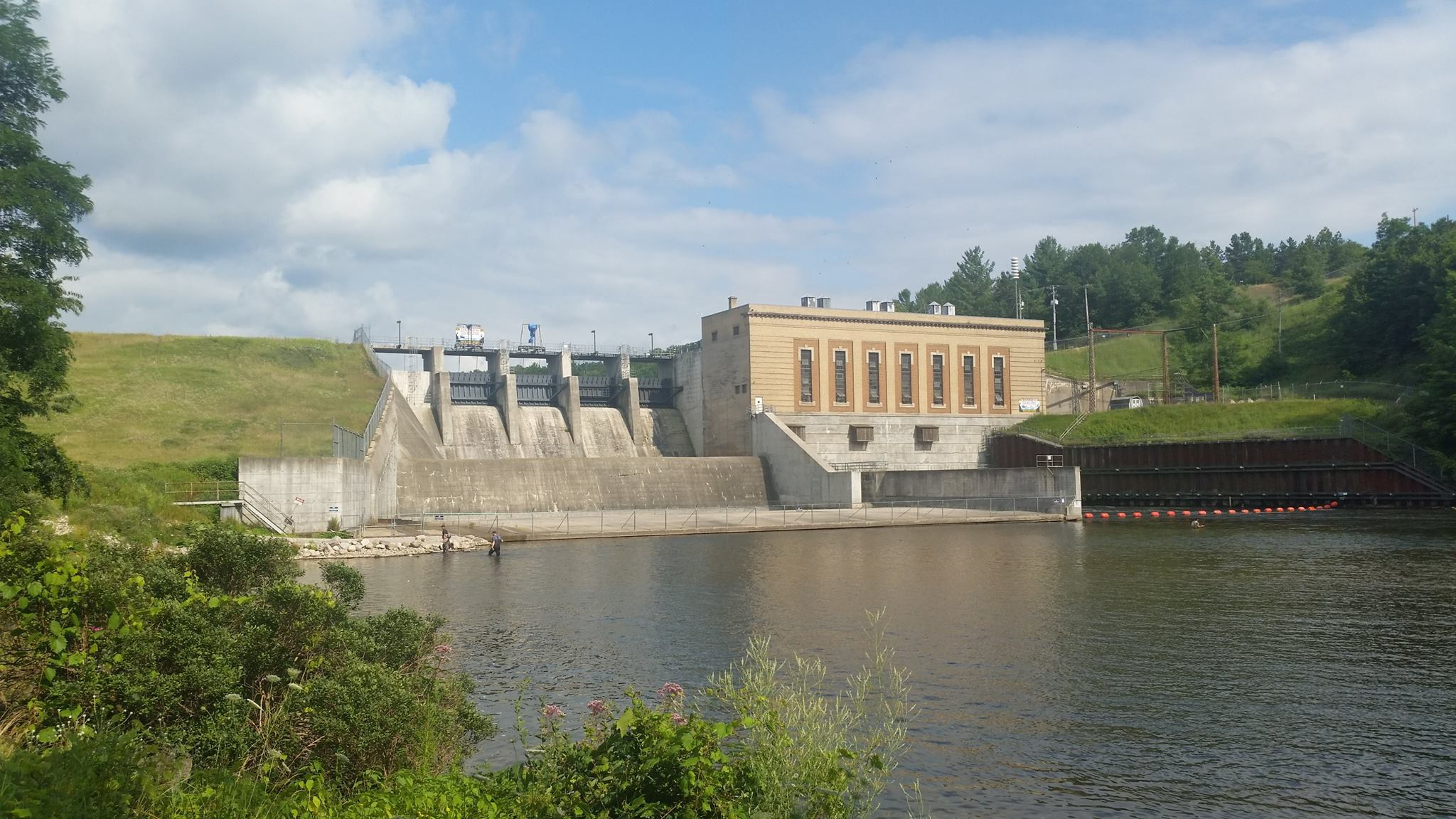
- Tippy Dam (July 2017)

- Location within the state Michigan
- Location: Dickson Township, Manistee County, Michigan
- Coordinates: 44.26009°N 85.94014°W
- Opening date: 1918

Dam and spillways
- Impounds: Manistee River

Tippy Dam or Tippy Hydro was built in 1918, and is a hydroelectric dam operated by Consumers Energy. The original name of the dam was Junction Hydro, but it was renamed to honor a Consumers board of directors member, Charles W. Tippy. The dam spans the Manistee River about 170 miles west from its headwaters, and approximately 20 miles east of its mouth with Lake Michigan, which includes Manistee Lake in Manistee as well.

== Recreation uses ==
Tippy Dam State Recreation Area is managed and operated by the Michigan Department of Natural Resources as a state park. Just below Tippy Dam is one of the finest trout, steelhead, and salmon fishing areas in Michigan. During the fall salmon run anglers line the banks shoulder to shoulder trying to catch king salmon that can weigh well over 20 pounds.

== Environmental ==
The hydro spillway chamber at Tippy is used by about 24,600 bats during the summer for roosting, swarming in the fall, and hibernation in the winter.

== Statistics ==
- Electric power produced by the water turbines: 20,000 kilowatts
