= Simeon Babcock House =

Historic house in Michigan, United States

- U.S. National Register of Historic Places
- Michigan State Historic Site
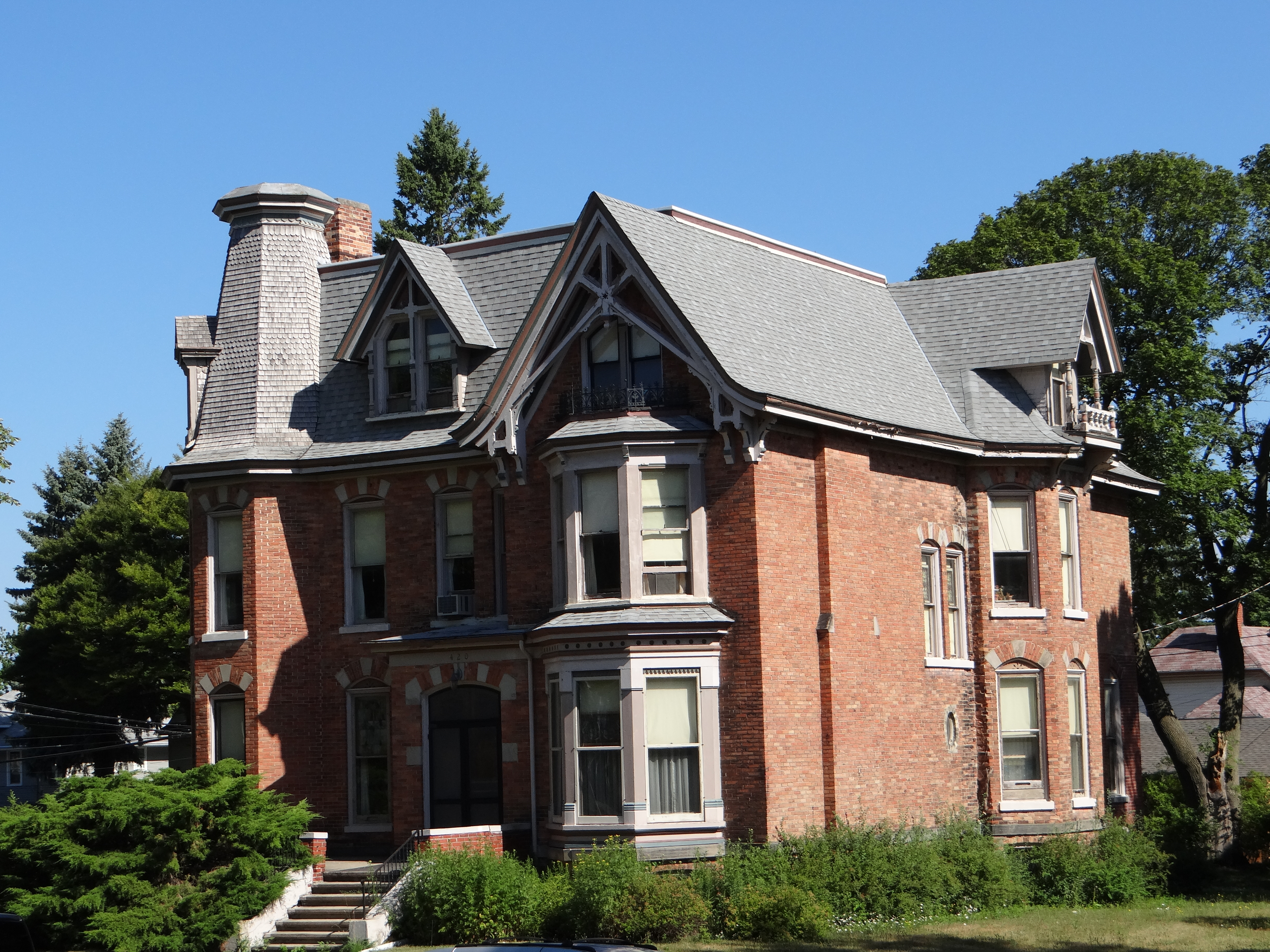

- Location within Michigan Location within the United States
- Interactive map showing the location of Simeon Babcock House
- Location: 420 Third St., Manistee, Michigan
- Coordinates: 44°14′40″N 86°19′33″W
- Area: less than one acre
- Built: 1881
- Architectural style: Stick/Eastlake
- NRHP reference No.: 99001455
- Added to NRHP: November 30, 1999

The Simeon Babcock House is a private house located at 420 Third Street in Manistee, Michigan.

== History ==
Simeon Babcock was born on July 1, 1832, near Utica, New York. His parents moved to Ohio, then Wisconsin, and by 1852 Babcock moved to Milwaukee and went into business for himself as a master carpenter and contractor. In 1870, Babcock partnered with Michael Engelmann to open a lumber business in Milwaukee, and in 1873 Ernest N. Salling of Manistee joined the partnership. The company built a mill in Manstee to provide lumber, and when Salling retired in 1877, Babcock moved to Manistee. In 1881, he built this house for himself. Babcock lived in the house until his death in 1896.

After Babcock died, his wife Sarah remained in the house until her own death in 1912. In 1915, the couple's daughter Ella sold the house to R. W. Smith, and in 1917 Smith rented the house to Philip P. Schnorbach, one of the leading industrialists in Manistee during the first half of the twentieth century. The Schnorbach continued renting the house until 19230, when they purchased it from Smith. Philip Schnorbach died in 1945, and his wife continued to live there until 1956. In 1961, the house was sold to Mrs. Alice M. Hunt Catlow, who sold it to her brother-in-law, John Noud Kelly, in 1963. Kelly lived in the house until 1994. In 1995, the house was sold to John Perschbacher, who continues to own the house.

It was listed on the National Register of Historic Places on November 30, 1999.

== Description ==
The house is a three-story brick structure measuring approximately fifty feet by sixty-two feet. The roof is a combination of gable and mansard types, and the entire house is somewhat asymmetrical, exhibiting an eclectic combination of High Victorian architectural styles, including Stick, Eastlake, and Second Empire. Two-story bay windows are located on three facades, and a three-story octagonal tower penetrates the roofline. The front entryway contains an elaborate pair of arched double doors.

On the interior, the first floor contains an entry hall, two parlors, a dining room, kitchen and library. The front hall has a parquet floor using contrasting woods, and the dining room has plaster molding and built-in china cupboard in the bay area. Woodwork made from pine, oak, maple, walnut, cherry, and rosewood is located throughout the house. An elaborate open staircase with turned balusters leads upward to the second and third stories. The second floor contains four principal bedrooms, a linen closet and a back hall. The third floor contains a large, roughly plastered room with several smaller rooms opening off from it.
