= Brethren, Michigan =

- Census-designated place (CDP) & unincorporated community
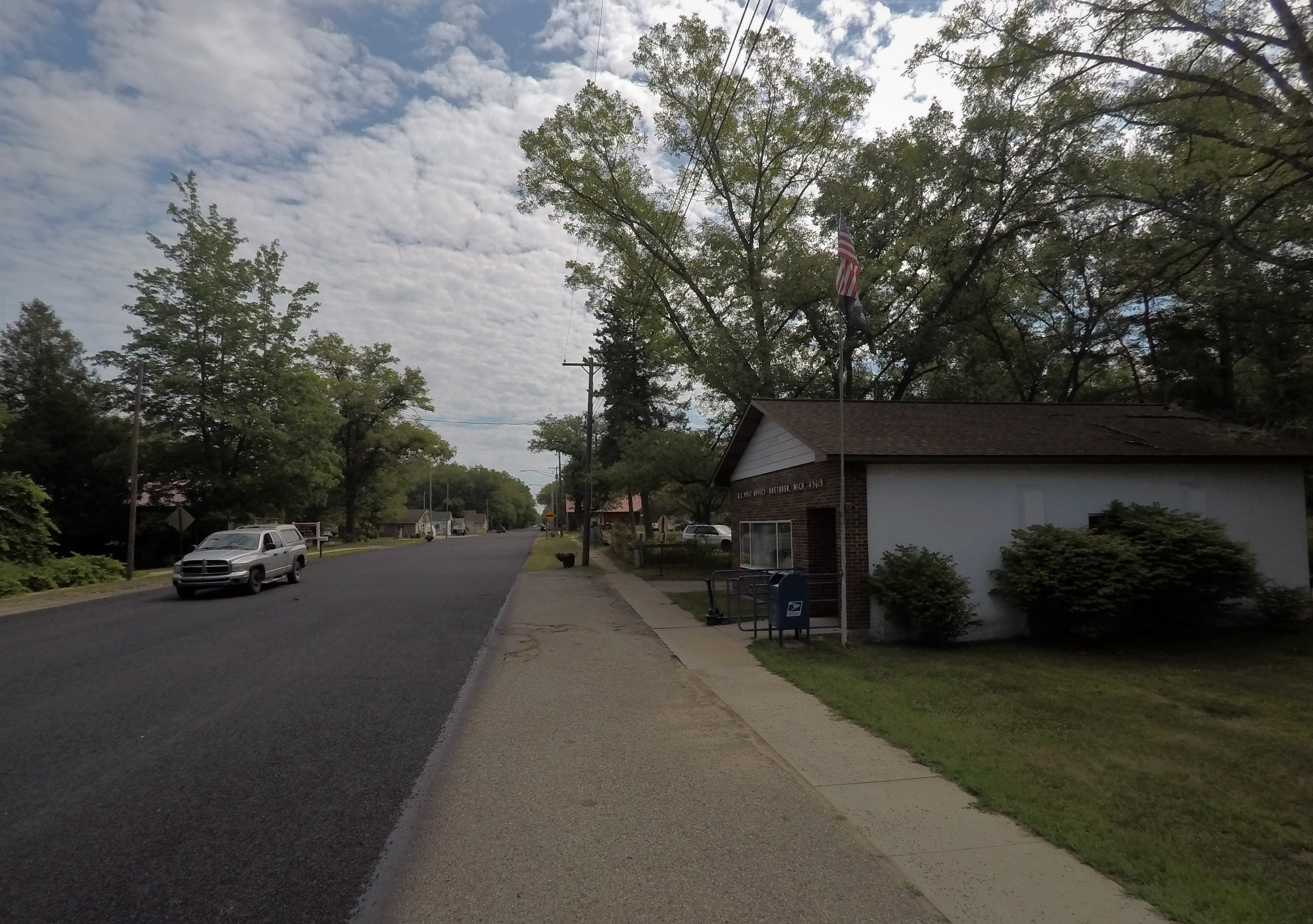
- Brethren post office

- Location within Michigan Location within the United States
- Coordinates: 44°18′16″N 86°01′08″W
- Country: United States
- State: Michigan
- County: Manistee
- Township: Dickson

Area
  - Total: 1.31 sq mi (3.40 km^{2})
  - Land: 1.28 sq mi (3.31 km^{2})
  - Water: 0.035 sq mi (0.09 km^{2})
- Elevation: 722 ft (220 m)

Population (2020)
  - Total: 331
  - Density: 258.8/sq mi (99.94/km^{2})
- Time zone: UTC-5 (Eastern (EST))
  - Summer (DST): UTC-4 (EDT)
- ZIP code: 49619
- Area code: 231
- GNIS feature ID: 621929
- FIPS code: 26-10300

Brethren is an unincorporated community and census-designated place (CDP) in the U.S. state of Michigan. The community is located within Dickson Township, Manistee County, and is in the Northern Lower Peninsula of Michigan. The community had a population of 331 at the 2020 census, down from 410 in 2010. The community is located in the Manistee National Forest, 18 miles (29 km) northeast of Manistee. Brethren has a post office with ZIP code 49619.

== History ==
Brethren was founded in 1900 by Samuel S. Thorpe as a colony of the German Baptist Brethren Church. A post office was established in 1901 with Thorpe as the first postmaster. The Pere Marquette Railway established a station here in 1901.

== Geography ==
According to the U.S. Census Bureau, the community has an area of 1.31 square miles (3.4 km^{2}), of which 1.28 square miles (3.3 km^{2}) are land and 0.035 square miles (0.091 km^{2}) are water. Boswell Creek forms the northern edge of the community, flowing west to the Manistee River. Lake Eleanor and Center Lake are small water bodies on the east side of the community.

== Notable resident ==
- James Earl Jones, the Emmy, Grammy, Oscar-nominated, and Tony award-winning actor and original voice of Darth Vader in the Star Wars franchise.
