= Sandenburgh-Rogers Summer Resort Complex =

- U.S. National Register of Historic Places
- U.S. Historic district
- Michigan State Historic Site
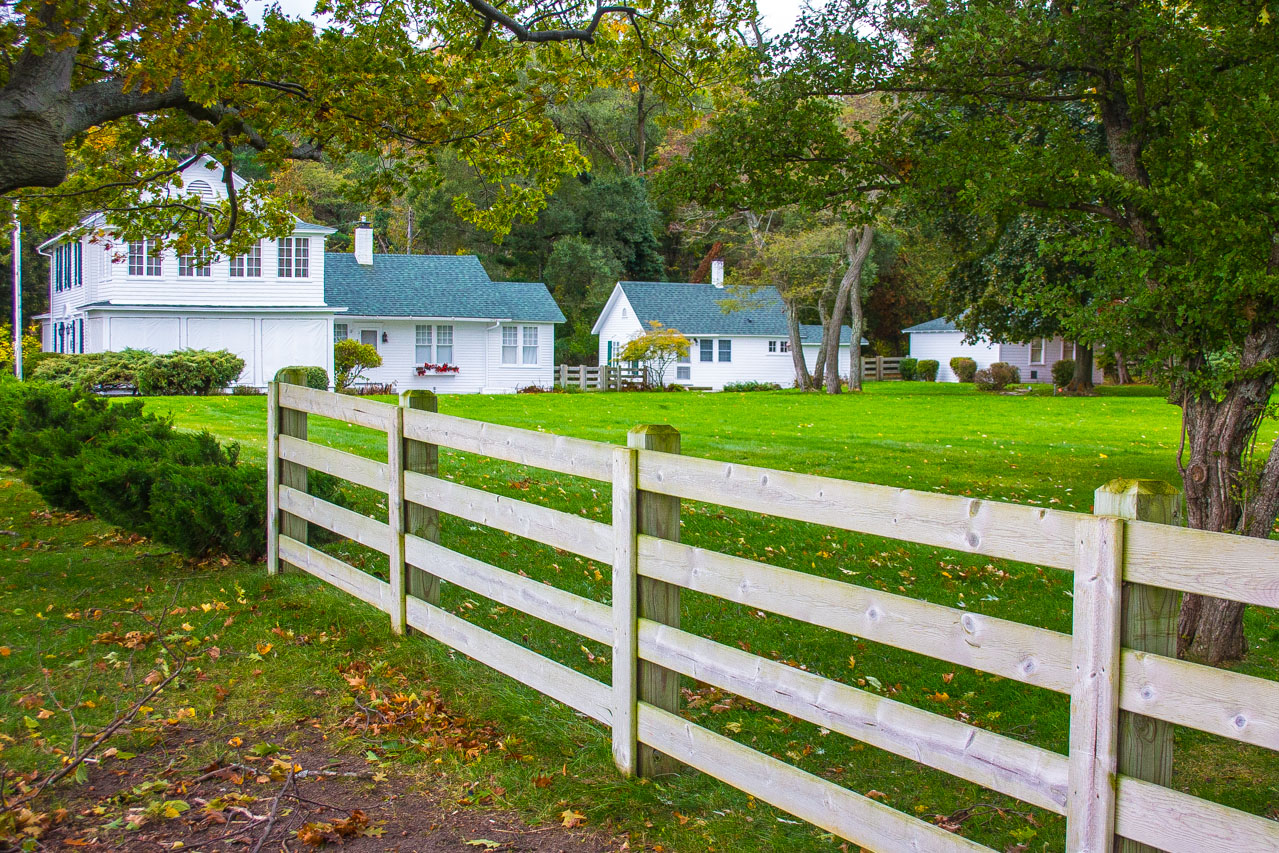

- Location within Michigan Location within the United States
- Interactive map
- Location: 2046 Crescent Beach Rd., Onekama Township, Michigan
- Nearest city: Williamsport, Michigan
- Coordinates: 44°21′28″N 86°15′41″W
- Area: 2 acres (0.81 ha)
- Built: 1882
- Architect: E. F. Hodgson Company, J. Alexander McColl
- Architectural style: Colonial Revival
- NRHP reference No.: 96001421
- Added to NRHP: December 6, 1996

The Sandenburgh-Rogers Summer Resort Complex, also known as the Interlochen Cottage, is a private summer home located at 2046 Crescent Beach Road in Williamsport, Michigan. It was listed on the National Register of Historic Places in 1996.

== History ==
Henry Sandenburgh was born in Prussia in 1853. He emigrated to the United States, married, and arrived in Williamsport in 1878 as a fisherman. Sandenburgh and his wife Mary purchased the lot this resort is on in 1880, and built a house which is no longer extant. They took in a boarder. In 1882, the couple constructed the main house of this complex, which allowed them to house four boarders. The Sandenburghs also lived in the house, along with their children. In 1908, Mary Sandenburgh purchased the Hotel Onekama in Onekama, Michigan and the family moved there. The Williamsport house was rented for the summer of 1908, and sold to William P. and Belle C. Rogers in 1909. Henry Sandenburgh died in 1913, and his wife Mary continued to operate the hotel until her death in 1928.

William P. Rogers was born in Bloomington, Indiana in 1857. He attended Indiana State University at Terre Haute, Columbia Law School, and practiced law and joined the Law Department at Indiana University. He soon became dean of the department, and in 1902 became dean of the Cincinnati Law School. He became involved in a number of community and business interests in Cincinnati, and eventually resigned his law school position to focus more on business. Rogers and his wife were one of the first resorters to discover the Onekama area. William Rogers died in 1921, leaving his wife Belle and daughters Kathryn and Norine as the principal family members in the Williamsport house. They developed the outbuildings and grounds of the complex, remodeling the house and adding a studio designed by the prefabricated building makers E. F. Hodgson Company.

== Description ==
The Sandenburgh-Rogers Summer Resort Complex consists of six structures: the summer residence, guest house, garage, studio, stables, and a maintenance building containing an apartment. The buildings are situated in two acres of landscaped grounds.

- Summer Residence (1882–83) The summer residence was constructed by Henry Sandenburgh, and renovated in 1919-20 and again in 1936 and c. 1940. It is a two-story, side-gabled Colonial Revival structure with a single story gabled wing at the rear. It has a symmetrical facade, with screened second-story porches on each side.
- Guest House (1882–83) The guest house was likely constructed as a barn around the time the main house was built. It is a symmetrical single story gable-roofed structure with a steeply pitched roof and a central entry porch protected by a canopy supported by two square pillars. The building is clad with weatherboard and sits on a cement slab foundation.
- Garage The Garage is a single story hipped-roof structure with two automobile bays. It is clad with weatherboard and has an asphalt shingle roof.
- Studio (1935) The studio was built for Kathryn Gates, Rogers's daughter, who was a painter. It is a prefabricated structure made by E. F. Hodgson Company, and is a single story, asymmetrical Colonial Revival structure with a hipped roof and a small off-center small entry porch supported by classical columns.
- Stable The stable is a single story rectangular building with a front-gable wing at each end containing five stalls. The sides are clad with asbestos shingles and the roof with asphalt shingles.
- Maintenance Building The maintenance building is a single story structure with an additional on the rear and wings on each end. The main structure has a hipped roof, the wings have side-gable roofs, and the read addition has a shed roof. The entire roof is covered with asphalt shingles, and the majority of the building is clad with asbestos siding.
