= Our Saviour's Evangelical Lutheran Church =

Historic church in Michigan, United States

- U.S. National Register of Historic Places
- Michigan State Historic Site
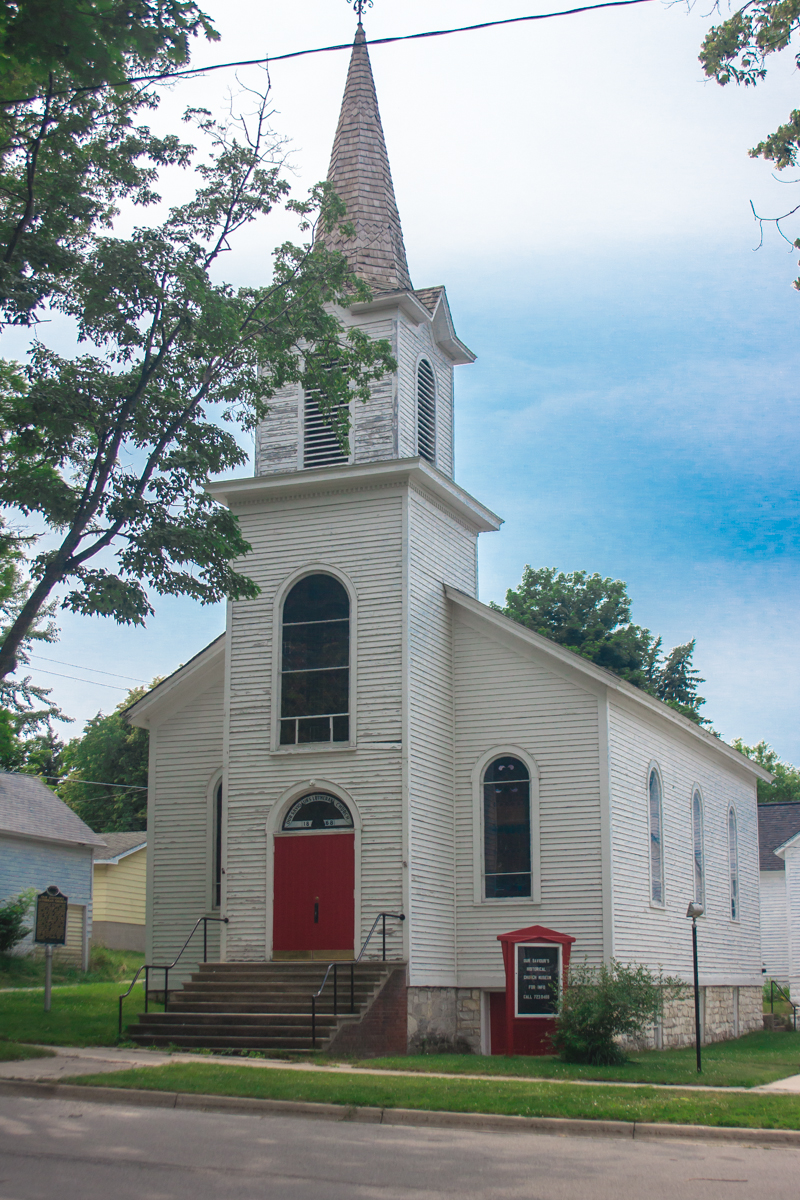
- The church in July 2014

- Location within Michigan Location within the United States
- Interactive map
- Location: 300 Walnut St. Manistee, Michigan
- Coordinates: 44°14′37″N 86°19′15″W
- Area: 1 acre (0.40 ha)
- Built: 1869
- Built by: Christian Petersen
- NRHP reference No.: 72000639

Significant dates
- Added to NRHP: August 21, 1972
- Designated MSHS: May 18, 1971

Our Saviour's Evangelical Lutheran Church, also known as the Danish Lutheran Church, is a historic church located at 300 Walnut Street in Manistee, Michigan. The church was added to the National Register of Historic Places in 1972. The building is the oldest existing Danish Lutheran church in the United States.

== History ==
Ground was broken on this church, then named the Scandinavian Evangelical Lutheran Church in May 1868, with construction done by Christian Petersen. However, construction money ran out, and the church building was not completed until the next year. The first worship service was held in the church on August 1, 1869, but the church still lacked a church tower, ceiling, organ, and pews. These were added slowly, with the tower being dedicated in 1888.

However, doctrinal disputes within the greater Scandinavian Evangelical Lutheran Church caused Swedes and Norwegians to form their own denominations, and in 1875, the congregation in Manistee renamed their church the Danish Lutheran Church in Manistee. In 1924, it was renamed Our Saviour's Evangelical Lutheran Church, and it operated until 1962 when the Danish Lutheran Church merged with other Scandinavian denominations. The church is open to visitors in the summer and includes a museum about the Danish-American history of Manistee County, Michigan.

== Description ==
Our Saviour's Evangelical Lutheran Church is a rectangular structure measuring 50 feet by 32 feet by 18 feet. It contains nine windows: three on each side and three in front. With classic Danish architectural influences, the church featuring an elaborate hand carved altar.

== Other sources ==
- Favrholdt, E. M. (1926) Labour in the vineyard : 55 years history of the Danish Lutheran Church in Manistee, Michigan, 1868-1923 (Manistee, MI: The Congregation of Our Saviors Lutheran Church)
- Nyholm, Paul C. (1963) The Americanization of the Danish Lutheran churches in America, a study in immigrant history (Minneapolis, MN: Augsburg Pub. House)
