= First Congregational Church (Manistee, Michigan) =

- First Congregational Church of Manistee, Michigan
- U.S. National Register of Historic Places
- Michigan State Historic Site
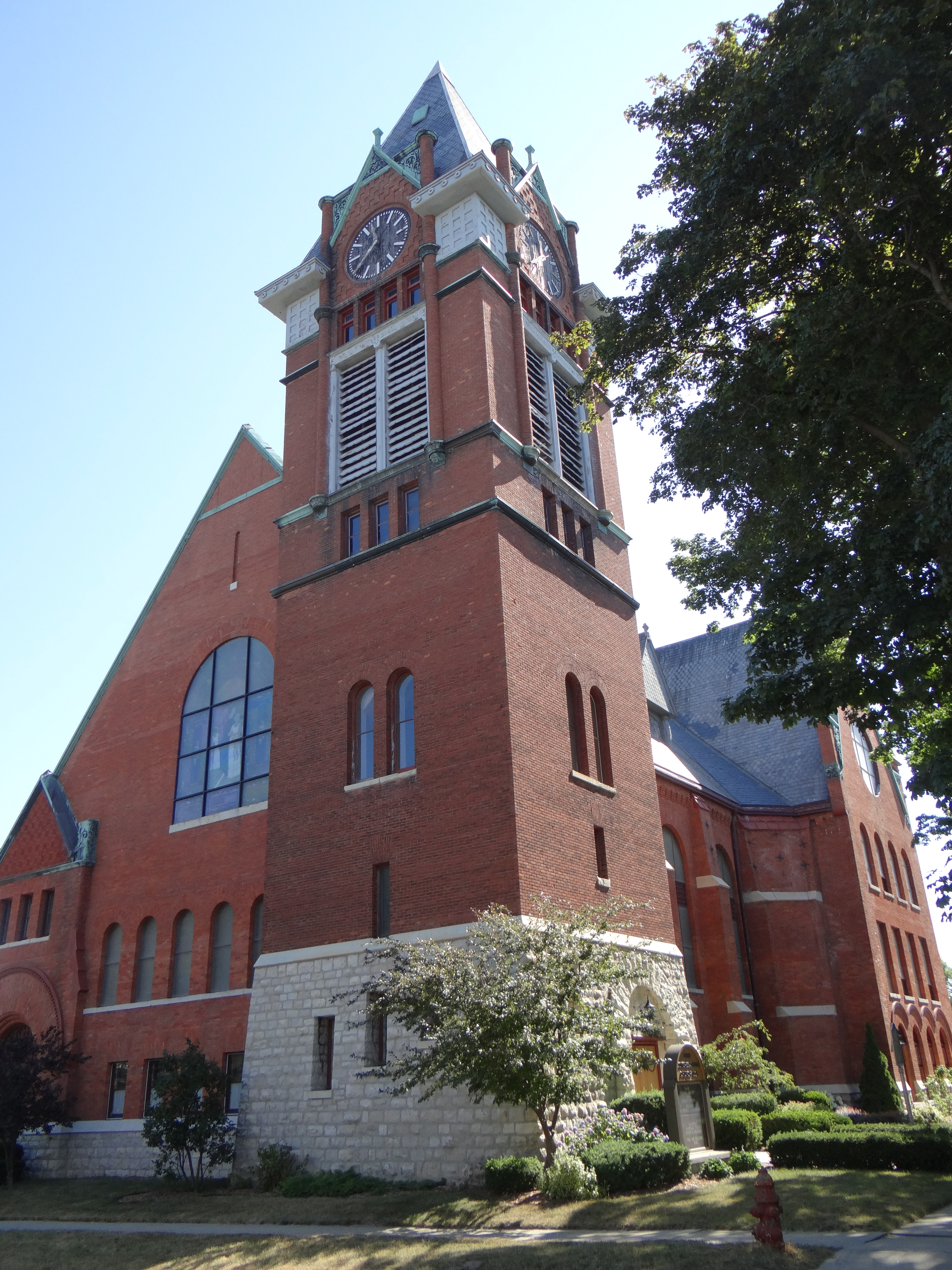
- First Congregational Church of Manistee, July 2012

- Location within Michigan
- Interactive map
- Location: 412 S. 4th St. Manistee, Michigan
- Coordinates: 44°14′41″N 86°19′13″W
- Area: less than one acre
- Built: 1888
- Built by: Sheridan and Newcomb
- Architect: William Jenney, William Otis
- Architectural style: Romanesque Revival
- NRHP reference No.: 74000995
- Added to NRHP: June 25, 1974

The First Congregational Church of Manistee, Michigan is a church located at 412 South 4th Street in Manistee, Michigan. It was listed on the National Register of Historic Places in 1974.

== History ==
The First Congregational Church was founded on July 20, 1862 with ten charter members. The Rev. George Thompson who had recently returned to Michigan following missionary work in Africa was persuaded to preach the first sermon and organize the new church. The church first moved into a building on the corner of Second and Oak, but the congregation quickly grew, and by 1886 the existing structure was clearly too small. Plans were made for a new church building, and the church hired William Jenney and William Otis of Chicago to design the building. Construction began in 1888 under the supervision of local contractors Sheridan and Newcombe. The church was dedicated on December 12, 1892. An organ was installed in 1911.

== Description ==
The First Congregational Church of Manistee is a Romanesque Revival structure constructed on a cruciform plan, measuring 128 feet by 74 feet. The church has a stone foundation, solid masonry walls clad with red brick, and a black slate roof. The facade is substantially unadorned, and contains a massive arched stone entrance. The windows are topped with masonry arches trimmed with terra cotta.

On the interior, the main sanctuary has a ceiling 60 feet high, supported with curved arches and hammer-beam trusses. Several stained glass windows are installed in the church, including one Tiffany glass window.
