= Wellston, Michigan =

- Census-designated place (CDP) & unincorporated community
- Location within Michigan Location within the United States
- Coordinates: 44°13′01″N 85°57′28″W
- Country: United States
- State: Michigan
- County: Manistee
- Township: Norman

Area
  - Total: 1.02 sq mi (2.63 km^{2})
  - Land: 0.97 sq mi (2.52 km^{2})
  - Water: 0.042 sq mi (0.11 km^{2})
- Elevation: 774 ft (236 m)

Population (2020)
  - Total: 254
  - Density: 260.7/sq mi (100.64/km^{2})
- Time zone: UTC-5 (Eastern (EST))
  - Summer (DST): UTC-4 (EDT)
- ZIP code: 49689
- Area code: 231
- GNIS feature ID: 1622084
- FIPS code: 26-85300

Wellston is an unincorporated community and census-designated place (CDP) in Norman Township, Manistee County, Michigan, United States. Its population was 254 as of the 2020 census, down from 311 in 2010. The community is in the Manistee National Forest just south of M-55, about 21 miles (34 km) east of Manistee and about 29 miles (47 km) west of Cadillac. Wellston has a post office with ZIP code 49689.

== History ==
Wellston was named for its first postmaster, Adelmer J. Wells. The post office officially opened June 30, 1892. The town was founded by the Swigart Land Company along the Chicago and West Michigan Railroad. Wellston is home to the critically ill children's ministry Little Mary's Hospitality House, which was founded in 1982.

== Geography ==
Wellston is in southeastern Manistee County, near the center of Norman Township. According to the U.S. Census Bureau, the CDP has an area of 1.01 square miles (2.6 km^{2}), of which 0.04 square miles (0.10 km^{2}), or 4.04%, are water. Two small lakes, Crystal Lake and Cranberry Lake, are within the CDP.

M-55 is a highway that runs along the northern edge of the community.

== Demographics ==
Historical population
| Census | Pop. | Note | %± |
|---|---|---|---|
| 2010 | 311 | | — |
| 2020 | 254 | | −18.3% |
U.S. Decennial Census
