= Manistee River =

River in Michigan, United States

Manistee River Big Manistee River
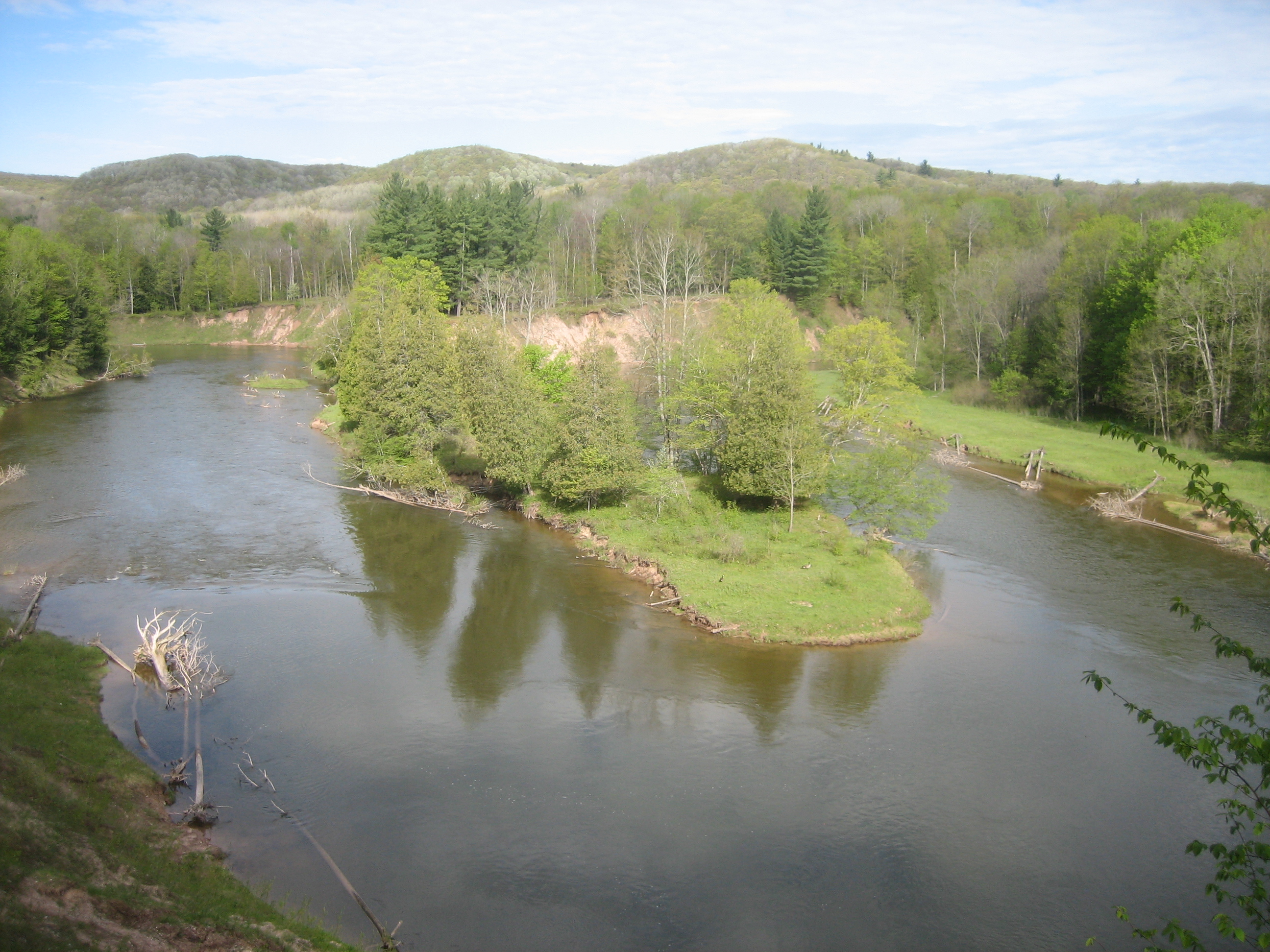
- The Manistee River in May 2007

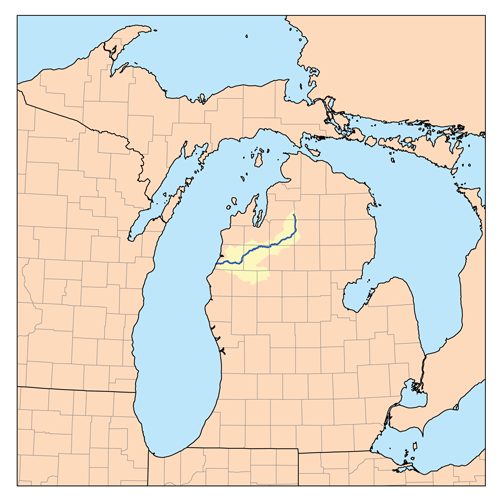
- Native name: Ministigweyaa (Ojibwe)

Location
- Country: United States
- State: Michigan

Physical characteristics
- Source
  - location: Mancelona Township, Michigan
  - coordinates: 44°56′06″N 084°52′06″W
  - elevation: 1,250 ft (380 m)
- Mouth: Lake Michigan
  - location: Manistee, Michigan
  - coordinates: 44°15′00″N 086°20′40″W
  - elevation: 579 ft (176 m)
- Length: 190 mi (310 km)
- Basin size: 1,780 sq mi (4,600 km^{2})

Basin features
- Tributaries
  - left: Little Manistee River, Pine River

The Manistee River (/ˌmænɪsˈti/ man-iss-TEE, seldom referred to as the Big Manistee River) is a 190-mile-long (310 km) river in the Lower Peninsula of the U.S. state of Michigan. The river rises in the Northern Lower Peninsula, and flows in a generally southwesterly direction to its mouth at Lake Michigan at the eponymous city of Manistee.

The Manistee River is considered, like the nearby Au Sable River, to be one of the best trout fisheries east of the Rockies. The Manistee River is also being considered for restoration of Arctic grayling, which have been extirpated from the State of Michigan since 1936.

== History ==
The name "Manistee" is from an Ojibwe word whose derivation is uncertain. However, it may be from ministigweyaa, "river with islands at its mouth". The Ojibwe (Chippewa in the United States) and Ottawa peoples lived along the river, with the Ottawa having a reservation on the river from 1836. The federally recognized Little River Band of Ottawa Indians continues to occupy its reservation in Manistee County, as well as lands in Mason County.

Historically, the upper river was renowned for its outstanding Arctic grayling fishery, among the finest in the world and at the extreme southern limit of the range of this salmonid. Catches in excess of 1000 fish per weekend outing were commonly reported up until the 1880s, when extensive logging in the area ruined the streams and habitat. Logging in the area commenced in earnest by European-American settlers between 1880 and 1910, with peak production occurring in the 1890s. Logging denuded habitat areas, with silt runoff and logging debris degrading the water quality of the river.

The river's relatively large size, stable flows, and dearth of cataracts or other difficult passages made it ideal for the transportation of lumber. During this period huge numbers of white pine logs, some as large as 6 feet (1.8 m) in diameter, were floated down the river to the port at Manistee and eventually on to the lumber markets of Grand Rapids, Milwaukee and Chicago. The wood was used to build the cities and towns of the Midwestern United States. Some of these logs became trapped at various points on the river, and can be seen today along the river bottom.

== Watershed and Course ==
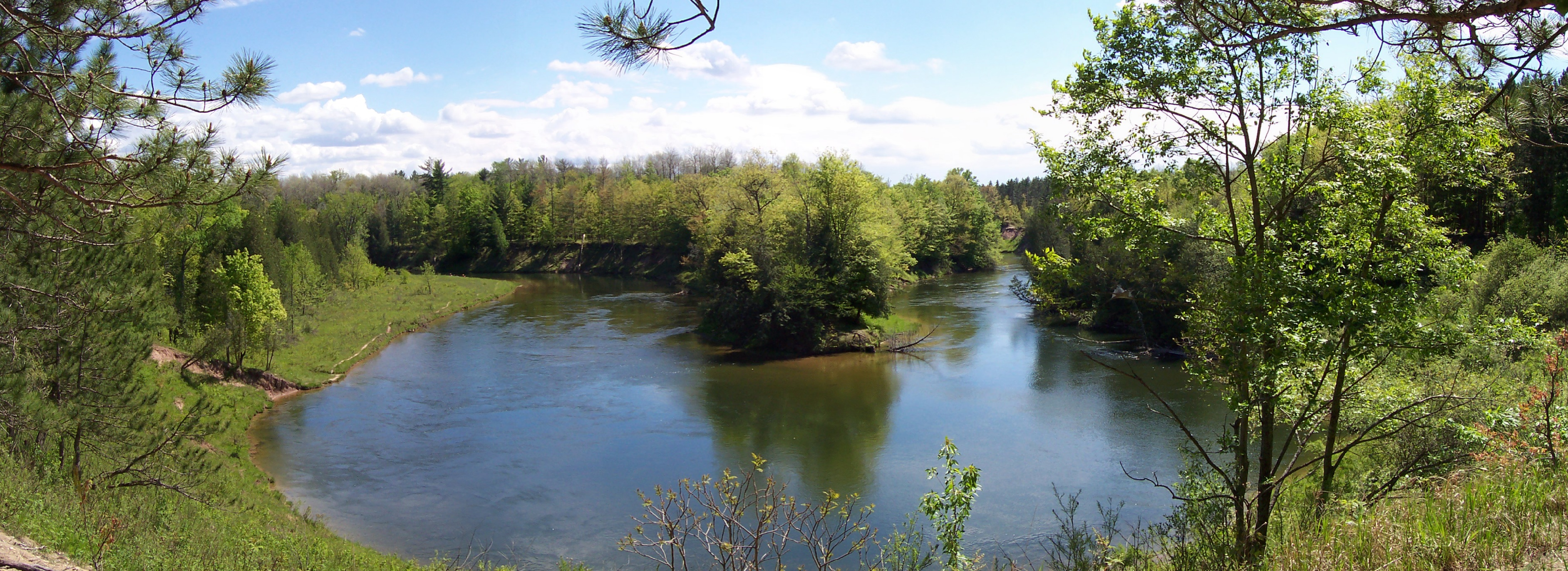
The Manistee River in May 2005

The river rises in the sand hills in southeastern Antrim County, on the border with Otsego County, about 6 miles (10 km) southeast of the town of Alba. These deep glacial sands provide it with a remarkably stable flow of clean cold water year round, making it a popular river for fishing as well as canoeing. Over the course of its length, it drops in elevation from around 1,250 to 579 feet (381 to 176 m), with an average stream gradient of about 2.9 feet per mile (55 cm/km).

== Ecology ==
Native fluvial fish species in the Manistee River include brook trout (Salvelinus fontinalis) and the now extinct Arctic grayling (Thymallus arcticus). The Manistee River has undergone considerable physical and biological alterations over the past century. In addition to extensive past logging in the region, two hydroelectric dams act as barriers to migration. Native species also suffer from competition or predation by non-native introduced salmonids including brown trout (Salmo trutta), steelhead/rainbow trout (Oncorhynchus mykiss), coho salmon (Oncorhynchus kisutch), and Chinook salmon (Oncorhynchus tshawytscha).

An interest in reestablishing Arctic grayling in the river by the Little River Band of Ottawa Indians led to a recent analysis of habitat suitability for Arctic grayling in Big Manistee River tributaries and some regions of the main stem was conducted from 2011 to 2013. Abiotic habitat conditions such as temperature, gravel, and water quality were found suitable for re-introduction of grayling, once the dominant salmonid in the State of Michigan. Another study of found that tributaries with low densities of non-native brown trout may be ideal for Arctic grayling re-introduction, since two fish species (brook trout and slimy sculpin (Cottus cognatus) that currently and historically occurred with grayling were found in lower numbers when predatory brown trout were present.

== Activities and Recreation ==
Today the river is used extensively for recreation, offering excellent conditions for canoeing, boating, and fishing. Having been restored since the ravages of the logging era, the river is again considered among the finest trout and salmon rivers in the country. Commercial navigation is possible in the lower stretches of the river below the Tippy Dam.

The Manistee River State Game Area is located upstream of Lake Manistee, and consists of areas of bayous and meandering marshlands located adjacent to the main river channel. This state game area is managed by the Michigan Department of Natural Resources and contains a total area of 3,920 acres which overlay the Manistee River east of Manistee, Michigan. The adjacent hunting and fishing areas include Tatches Bayou, Claybanks Bayou, and Anderson Bayou. Duck hunting and northern pike fishing are popular activities within the managed marshland.

== Bridges ==
List of Bridge Crossings
Route	Type	Municipality	County	Location
Maple Street	City Street	Manistee	Manistee	44°14′54.2″N 86°19′25.3″W
US 31 (Cypress Street)	City Street/US Highway	Manistee	Manistee	44°15′01.2″N 86°19′08.9″W
M-55	Michigan Highway	Manistee Township	Manistee	44°15′51.4″N 86°17′43.7″W
North High Bridge Road	County Road	Dickson Township	Manistee	44°16′02.8″N 86°00′50.3″W
Coates Highway	County Road	Dickson Township	Manistee	44°17′01.8″N 85°51′37.8″W
M-115	Michigan Highway	Springville Township	Wexford	44°24′23.1″N 85°44′01.7″W
M-37 (13 Road)	Michigan Highway	Wexford/Hanover line	Wexford	44°26′11.2″N 85°41′54.2″W
North 19 Road	County Road	Hanover Township	Wexford	44°26′21.1″N 85°38′32.6″W
North 29 ½ Road	County Road	Greenwood Township	Wexford	44°29′33.8″N 85°31′38.5″W
US 131	US Route	Liberty Township	Wexford	44°29′03.4″N 85°24′22.8″W
West Fahrney Road	County Road	Bloomfield Township	Missaukee	44°30′18.3″N 85°18′35.6″W
Coster Road Southwest	County Road	Springfield Township	Kalkaska	44°31′39.6″N 85°16′34.4″W
M-66	Michigan Highway	Garfield Township	Kalkaska	44°31′25.9″N 85°10′19.1″W
West Sharon Road	County Road	Garfield Township	Kalkaska	44°35′07.3″N 85°05′25.1″W
County Road 571	County Road	Garfield Township	Kalkaska	44°35′14.9″N 85°04′37.3″W
Sunset Trail Southeast	County Road	Oliver Township	Kalkaska	44°36′53.3″N 84°59′29.2″W
M-72	Michigan Highway	Frederic Township	Crawford	44°41′34.3″N 84°50′50.6″W
County Road 612	County Road	Frederic Township	Crawford	44°46′16.5″N 84°50′30.2″W
Cameron Bridge Road	County Road	Frederic Township	Crawford	44°47′59.6″N 84°50′25.2″W
C-38 (Mancelona Road)	County Road	Hayes Township	Otsego	44°54′04.9″N 84°50′42.0″W

== Drainage basin ==
The Manistee River drains land in the following counties:

- Antrim County
- Benzie County
- Crawford County
- Grand Traverse County
- Kalkaska County
- Lake County
- Manistee County
- Mason County
- Missaukee County
- Osceola County
- Otsego County
- Wexford County
