= Onekama =

Onekama is the name of a village and a township in Manistee County, in the U.S. state of Michigan:

- Onekama, Michigan
- Onekama Township, Michigan
