= Camp Tosebo =

- U.S. National Register of Historic Places
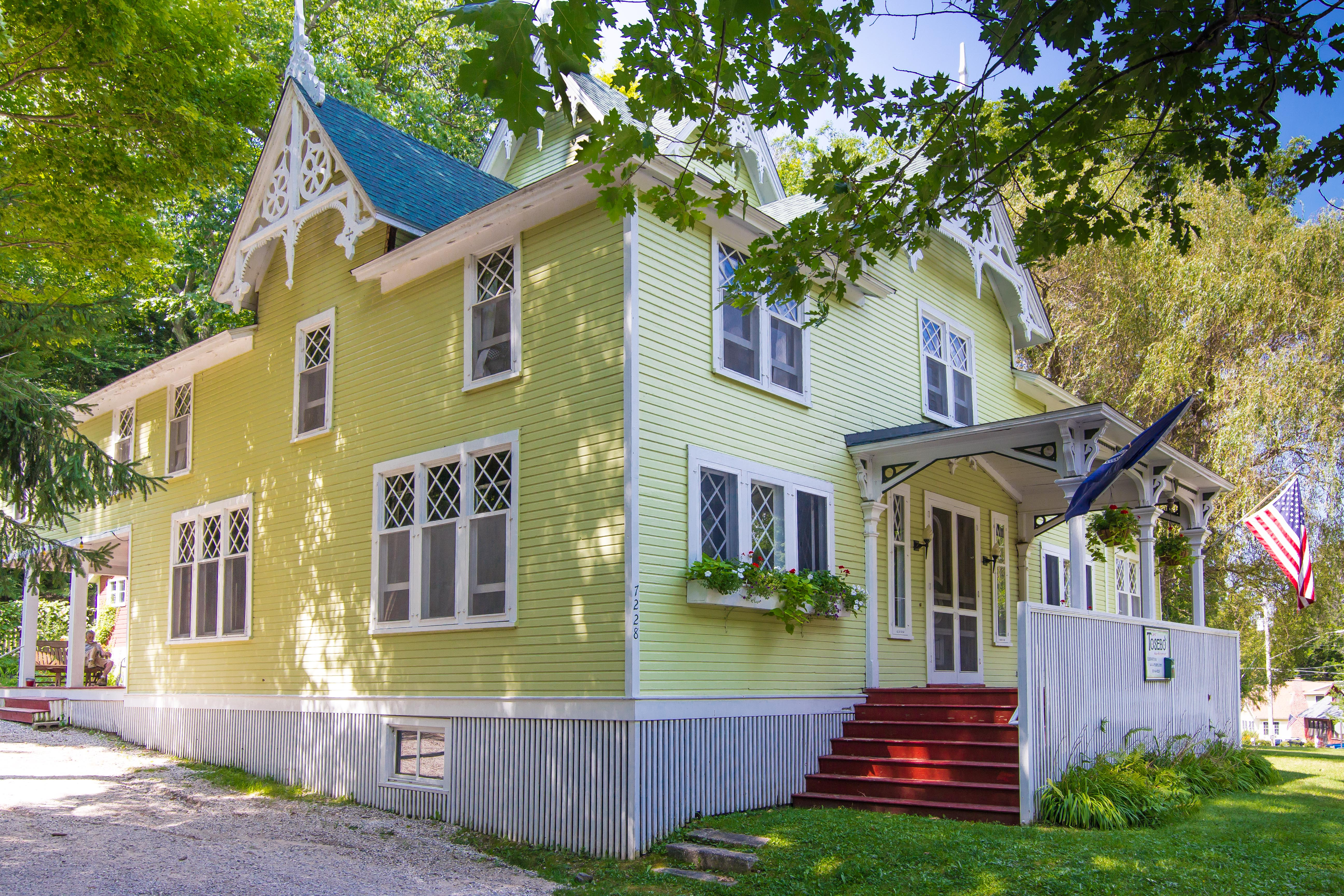
- Clubhouse

- Location within Michigan
- Interactive map
- Location: 7228 Miller Road, Red Park, Michigan
- Nearest city: Onekama, Michigan
- Coordinates: 44°20′58″N 86°14′32″W
- Built: 1914-1918
- Built by: Charles A. Anderson
- Architectural style: Bungalow/Craftsman, Late Victorian
- NRHP reference No.: 00000644
- Added to NRHP: December 21, 2000

Camp Tosebo, on the south shore of Portage Lake in Onekama Township, Michigan, was established in 1912 by Noble Hill, the headmaster of the Todd Seminary for Boys in Woodstock, Illinois, as one of the first summer camps in the United States. The name of the camp is an acronym derived from the school's name, TOdd SEminary for BOys, and meant to sound like a Native American Indian word. The camp was listed on the National Register of Historic Places in 2000.

== History ==
Portage Lake was first developed in the 1840s, when a sawmill was constructed near the old lake outlet. Lumbering was the principal industry until the 1880s, but the summer resort industry quickly developed in its wake. The Red Park resort, occupying part of the current Camp Tosebo, was developed in 1895 by Cleveland G. Davis. Red Park included a dance pavilion, now the Camp Tosebo Clubhouse, and numerous cottages nearby. In 1901, Noble Hill constructed a cottage in the area. Hill was a pioneer in progressive education as a teacher and then headmaster and owner of the Todd Seminary for Boys. Davis intended to continue the development of the resort, but by 1912, the area was in decline due to competition from other resorts in the area.

Noble Hill opened Camp Tosebo in 1912 on property near his cottage as an extension of the Todd Seminary for Boys school program. The program immediately flourished, and in 1914 Hill purchased the former Red Park dance pavilion and its associated property. Hill hired Charles A. Anderson of Manistee as a general contractor to transform the pavilion into a clubhouse. Tents were used to house the boys initially; by the 1920s the smallest boys stayed in a cabin. Camp Tosebo soon had tennis courts, an arts and crafts shed, shower facilities, and other outbuildings.

Orson Welles attended the Todd Seminary for Boys, and in 1932 visited Camp Tosebo.

Noble Hill, and later his son Roger Hill and daughter Carol Hill Taylor Fawcett, continued to run the camp even after the Todd Boys School closed in 1954. However, in 1962, the camp passed out of their ownership. It continued to operate as a boys' summer camp under the name "Camp Tosebo" until 1978. The camp was re-imagined as a bed-and-breakfast, and as of 2018 the camp operates as a resort rental on its 56 acres (230,000 m^{2}) wooded property and fully restored buildings.

== Description ==
Camp Tosebo is located in a wooded area on the shore of Portage Lake. It contains the former campground in an open field and a number of late 19th-century and early 20th-century buildings. The most significant of these are the Camp Tosebo Clubhouse, the Trunk House, and the Welcome House. Other structures include a Shower House, toilet, craft house, bunkhouses, boat house, and three more cottages.

The Camp Tosebo Clubhouse is a two-story balloon-framed structure combining an Arts and Crafts style with late Victorian and Stick Style elements. It has a cross-gable and hip roof with a central cupola, and a hip roof front porch, and is clad with clapboard siding. Much of the clubhouse was recycled from the 1895 Red Park dance pavilion. The main portion of the clubhouse measures 40 feet by 60 feet. A 12 foot by 60 foot flat-roofed addition to one side was completed in 1912. A poured cement basement was added to the structure in 1995/96. The interior of the Clubhouse originally contained the camp dining room, kitchen, pantry, recreation rooms, and a sitting room on the first floor, with bedrooms and bathrooms on the second floor. Recent renovations converted the upper floor into nine guest rooms and seven baths.

The Trunk House is a two-story balloon-framed rectangular structure, constructed in 1916, with a hip roof. It is covered with horizontal wooden weatherboarding and has one-over-one double-hung windows. It measures 32 feet by 22 feet.

The Welcome House, or Fred W. Cron Cottage, us a two-story L-shaped balloon-framed cottage with a gable roof. Fred Cron was a Manistee dealer in furniture and carpeting, and constructed this cottage as one of the first on Cleveland G. Davis's Red Park Resort. The cottage was built in 1896, and Noble Hill purchased it in 1927.
