= Todd Seminary for Boys =

School in Illinois, United States

The Todd Seminary for Boys (1848–1954) was an independent preparatory school located in Woodstock, in the U.S. state of Illinois. From 1930 it was called the Todd School for Boys. Under headmaster Roger Hill from 1929, it became a progressive school that provided students including Orson Welles with a creative educational environment that emphasized practical experience over traditional academics. Only one building, Rogers Hall, remains from the original campus.

== History ==
The Todd School for Boys was founded by Reverend Richard K. Todd, who brought from his native Vermont, the New England philosophy of "plain living and high thinking, and in harmony with Puritan traditions".

Reverend Todd moved to Woodstock, Illinois, from Vermont in 1847 to be pastor of a newly formed Presbyterian Church. In 1848 he opened a day school in the parsonage, for both boys and girls. This parsonage school continued to 1859, the student population ranged between 6 and 15 students. During this time Reverend Todd also served as the School Superintendent for McHenry County from 1849 to 1855.

In 1858 the plans for the Pastorage Institute were announced in the Woodstock Sentinel to form a boarding school. The Pastorage Institute grew in enrollment until, in 1861, the Woodstock University was incorporated by the state legislature. In 1864, the title of the school was again changed, this time to the Woodstock Collegiate Institute. At this time the student body consisted of between 80 and 149 students, mostly from the McHenry County area.

In 1867 the school underwent extensive improvements at which time it became exclusively a seminary for boys, and became known as the Woodstock Institute. It held this name until 1873 when it became known as the Todd Seminary for Boys. The final name change occurred in 1930 when it became the Todd School for Boys.

Noble Hill joined the institution in 1888 as Reverend Todd's assistant. Hill resigned a year later due to differences in opinions with Todd. A year later Hill returned with a promise from Todd that he would have his full support. Reverend Todd's wife died during the winter of 1891 and the Reverend now in his 70s went to live with his son who was a professor at the university that would become Stanford University.

In June 1892 Noble Hill arranged to purchase the Seminary from Reverend Todd, at a cost of $20,000.

In 1929, Noble Hill transferred ownership of the school to his son Roger Hill, called Skipper, and retired to California. As headmaster, Skipper Hill developed the Todd Seminary for Boys into a progressive educational institution based on his philosophy that all young people were "created creators". In addition to academics the school's educational plan offered a 300-acre working farm; a radio station; a theatre company with facilities on campus and tour buses that took the company throughout North America; sound motion picture production facilities; and a nearby airport with a flight simulator and small aircraft for students who were interested in flying their own plane.

The New Yorker described Todd in October 1938:

Todd is a preparatory school of considerable antiquity, now run on severely progressive lines. The present headmaster, Roger Hill, a slim white-haired, tweed-bearing man, who looks as if he had been cast for his role by a motion-picture director, has never let the traditional preparatory-school curriculum stand in the way of creative work. All the boys spend as much time as they want in the machine shop, the print shop, the bookbindery, or the school theatre.

The Todd School for Boys closed in 1954.

== Campus ==
In 1937 the Todd School campus consisted of an area of Woodstock bound by McHenry Avenue, Seminary Avenue, Northampton Street and Mansfield Avenue. In addition the school purchased in 1904 20 acres (81,000 m^{2}) of woods 1 mile (1.6 km) north of the school grounds. These woods were referred to as the Seminary Woods in school publications.

Main buildings on the campus included Wallingford Hall, Clover Hall, Rogers Hall, Grace Cottage, the gymnasium, Headmasters' Cottage, West Cottage, Cozy Cottage and North Cottage. The school also had an airstrip located to the east of the campus, where Marian Central Catholic High School is now located.

From 1912, the school operated a summer camp in Onekama Township, Michigan, called Camp Tosebo. There was also a winter campus on Marathon Key, Florida, that was called Todd Island.

With the demolition of Grace Hall in 2010, Rogers Hall is the sole remaining building from the original campus. Rogers Hall, once a classroom building with a 200-seat theater, is now an apartment building.

== Notable alumni ==
Thomas in 1907

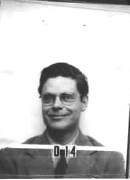
Robert R. Wilson's ID badge photo from Los Alamos

=== Earl D. Thomas ===
Earl Dennison Thomas attended from 1859 to 1861. A veteran of the American Civil War, he went on to graduate from the United States Military Academy and was a brigadier general when he retired in 1911.

=== Robert Wilson ===
Nuclear physicist Robert R. Wilson attended the school in 1922, at the age of eight. When his parents separated Wilson lived with his grandmother, Nellie Embree Rathbun, who went to work at Todd as a house mother. Soon after beginning her employment she married headmaster Noble Hill, who had been widowed in 1914.

One of the Manhattan Project physicists, Wilson was a sculptor, writer and founding director (1967–1978) of Fermilab, the Fermi National Accelerator Laboratory. A professor of physics at Cornell University, he also taught at the University of Chicago and Columbia University and won the National Medal of Science and the Enrico Fermi Award.

=== Orson Welles ===
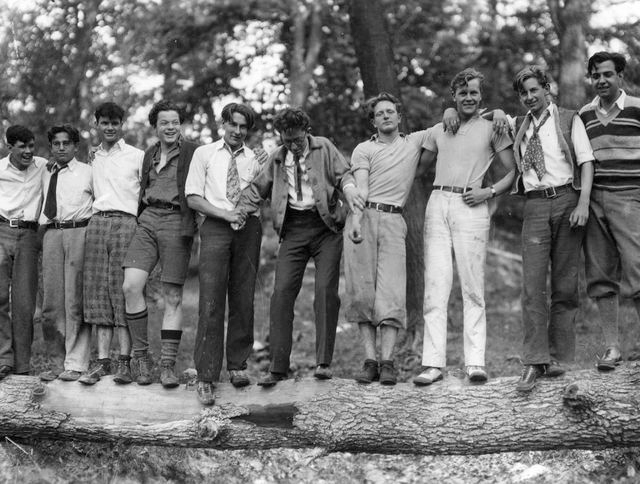
Orson Welles, fourth from left, with classmates at the Todd School for Boys (1931)

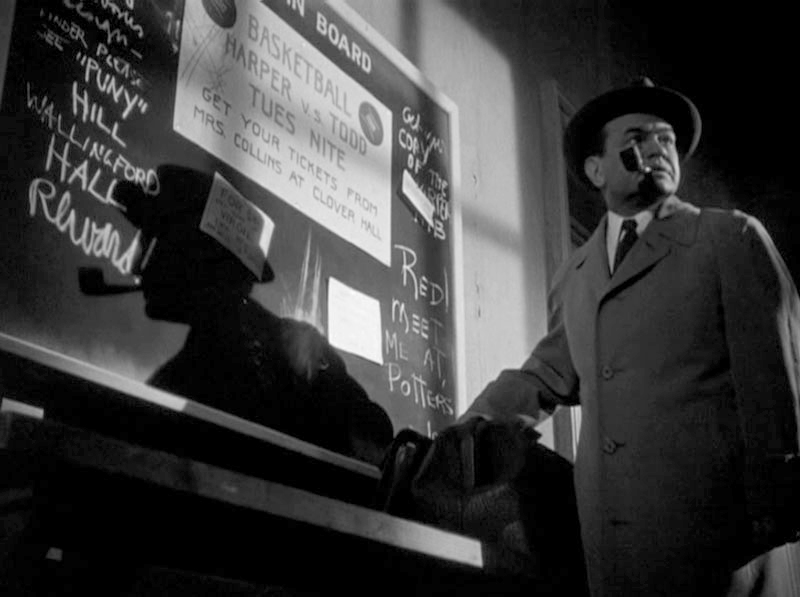

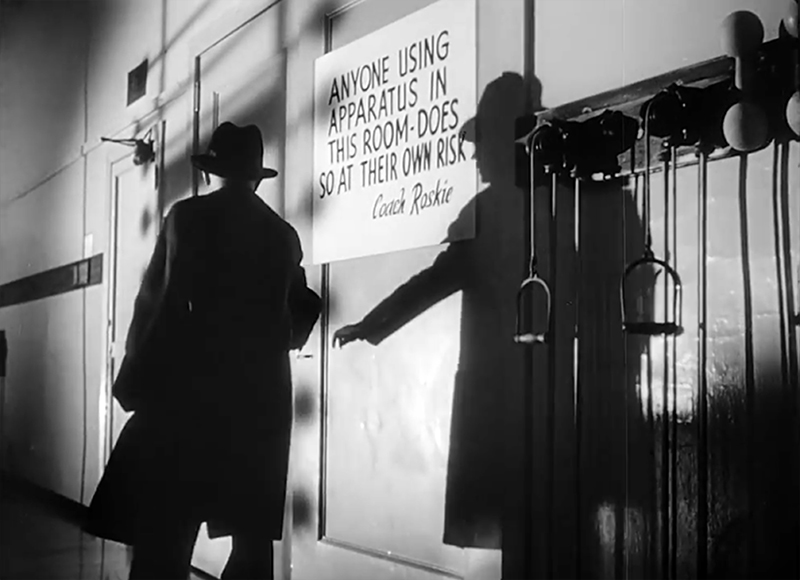
In his 1946 film, The Stranger, Welles makes inside references to the Todd School, which he had hoped to use as the shooting location

I'd say the biggest influence was Roger Hill, who became headmaster of the school to which I went for three years, and with whom I later wrote four textbooks on Shakespeare. He's still a great, a valued, friend. … I can't imagine life without him, and I go ten years without seeing him but it doesn't seem like ten years because I think of him all the time. He was a great direct influence in my life—the biggest by all odds. I wanted to be like him.

— Orson Welles

Orson Welles entered the Todd Seminary for Boys September 15, 1926, at age 11. His older brother, Richard Ives Welles, had attended the school ten years before but was expelled for misbehavior.

At Todd Welles came under the influence of teacher, later headmaster, Roger Hill, who became his mentor and lifelong friend. Hill provided Welles an ad hoc educational environment that proved invaluable to his creative experience, allowing him to concentrate on subjects that interested him.

"I was passionate about the theatre—putting on plays was all I ever wanted to do with my life—and Skipper, God bless him, was the only one of my elders who encouraged my theatrical ambitions," Welles recalled. "That's why they call him my mentor, you know." In spring 1927 Welles became a member of the Todd Troupers, a touring company that presented shows in suburban Chicago movie houses and the Goodman Theatre. For three years Welles was director of productions at Todd, producing eight to ten plays a year. These included Molière's The Physician in Spite of Himself, Dr. Faustus, and an innovative Everyman that he staged with platforms and ladders.

Welles graduated in 1931 and later collaborated with Hill to write a series of books, Everybody's Shakespeare. "Edited for Reading and Arranged for Staging", the plays were shortened to acting versions of a reasonable length and illustrated with numerous line drawings by Welles. In 1934 three plays—Julius Caesar, The Merchant of Venice and Twelfth Night—were published separately and in a single volume by The Todd Press and marketed strictly as textbooks for secondary schools. In 1941 a fourth play, Macbeth, was published by Harper & Brothers, which had begun reissuing the series under the title The Mercury Shakespeare. By 1942 over 100,000 copies were sold. Welles refused royalties, which instead went to the Todd school along with generous contributions to the scholarship fund from Welles and his friend Charles Lederer.

Todd remained Welles's base of operations for many years, and he returned occasionally to Woodstock for Todd student productions. As a member of the Todd faculty he designed and co-directed a student production of Twelfth Night that received first prize in the Chicago Drama Festival competition at the 1933 Chicago World's Fair. In July 1934 he organized the Todd Theatre Festival, a six-week summer festival at the Woodstock Opera House that featured Hilton Edwards and Micheál MacLiammóir of Dublin's Gate Theatre. His short film The Hearts of Age was shot on the Todd campus during the festival.

Welles planned to use the Todd campus as the setting for his 1946 film, The Stranger. The idea was ruled out by budget restrictions, but a few artifacts are seen in the film. A sign in the Harper School gymnasium reads "Harper vs. Todd" and refers to Clover Hall and "Mrs. Collins"—Annetta Collins, teacher, housemother and director of kitchen services. It was Collins who had recruited Welles for Todd in 1926, after meeting the boy at his father's hotel in Grand Detour, Illinois. A note on a blackboard, in Welles's handwriting, refers to Wallingford Hall. Another notice is signed "Coach Roskie"—Anthony C. Roskie, Todd's longtime athletic director.

In a 1960 interview, Welles was asked what place, inside him, had a sense of home: "When you think of it, where do you think of it?"

Welles responded that he had been moved around many times as a child and he had many homes, but not that one place. "I suppose it's Woodstock, Illinois, if it's anywhere," Welles finally replied. "I went to school there for four years. If I try to think of a home, it's that."

=== Joseph Granville ===
Joseph Granville (class of 1941), stock market technical analyst and publisher of The Granville Market Letter (1963–2013), was best known for his books on the financial markets. He also wrote books about stamp collecting as an investment and how to win at bingo. He attended Todd on a music scholarship. After a school bus tour to Mexico he wrote his first book, A School Boy's Faith: Impressions of a Todd Student (1941), a book of poetry that was both travelogue and an expression of his philosophy of life.

=== E. D. Hirsch, Jr. ===
E. D. Hirsch, Jr. (class of 1946), literary critic and educator, wrote the bestselling book, Cultural Literacy: What Every American Needs to Know (1987), and generated a storm of controversy. The book brought Hirsch's ideas to a general audience and led to his founding the Core Knowledge Foundation, an organization that promotes the teaching of a shared core of knowledge in American schools.

=== Gahan Wilson ===
Gahan Wilson (class of 1948), cartoonist and illustrator, transferred to Todd after one year in a public high school. His work appeared in Todd's school newspaper. Wilson later contributed short stories and cartoons to Esquire, Look, National Lampoon, The New York Times, The New Yorker, Playboy and Punch, provided commentary for National Public Radio, and wrote a column for The Magazine of Fantasy & Science Fiction. One of the founders of the World Fantasy Convention, he designed the World Fantasy Award. Recalling Todd in a 2013 interview, Wilson said, "It was a wonderful school. They encouraged you in whatever direction you wanted to go."

=== Christopher Welles ===
"Todd School was a strong point of connection between my father and me," wrote Christopher Welles Feder, eldest daughter of Orson Welles, who attended Todd from 1947 through the summer of 1949. She was sent to live with Roger and Hortense Hill at the age of nine, when her mother's second marriage (to Charles Lederer) ended. Christopher Welles spent nearly two years with the Hills and had the distinction of being the only girl to attend the Todd School for Boys. At age 11 she was called to join her mother and her third husband in Italy. "The conviction that my true home lay among decent, caring folk in small-town America kept me going during the early bewilderment of Rome," Welles's daughter recalled.
