= Marilla =

Marilla can refer to:

- Marilla, New York
- Marilla Township, Michigan
- Marilla Ricker, American Suffragist
- Marilla Cuthbert, a primary character in the novel Anne of Green Gables and its sequels
- Marilla, a song from Jacobite Relics
