= Marilla Township, Michigan =

- Township
- Location within Michigan Location within the United States
- Coordinates: 44°22′30″N 85°53′25″W
- Country: United States
- State: Michigan
- County: Manistee

Area
  - Total: 35.62 sq mi (92.3 km^{2})
  - Land: 35.47 sq mi (91.9 km^{2})
  - Water: 0.15 sq mi (0.39 km^{2})
- Elevation: 1,050 ft (320 m)

Population (2020)
  - Total: 398
  - Density: 11.2/sq mi (4.3/km^{2})
- Time zone: UTC-5 (Eastern (EST))
  - Summer (DST): UTC-4 (EDT)
- ZIP codes: 49625 (Copemish); 49645 (Kaleva); 49668 (Mesick)
- FIPS code: 26-101-51580
- GNIS feature ID: 1626686
- Website: marillatownshipmi.gov

Marilla Township is a civil township of Manistee County in the U.S. state of Michigan. The population was 398 at the 2020 census.

== History ==
The first settler in the area of the township was C. Churchill from New York state, who arrived in June 1866. The township was organized in 1869, having previously been part of Brown Township. It was named after the sister of one of the original members of the township board of supervisors.

== Communities ==
- Marilla is an unincorporated community near the center of the township at 44°22′15″N 85°52′51″W. A post office operated from October 1871 until June 1935. It was also a station on the Manistee and North-Eastern Railroad.
- Yates or Yates Corner was a rural post office in the northwest part of the township established in June 1884. The office was transferred and renamed Lemon Lake in April 1902. The office continued to operate until February 1904. Like Marilla, Lemon Lake was a station on the Manistee and North-Eastern Railroad.

== Geography ==
According to the United States Census Bureau, the township has a total area of 35.6 square miles (92 km^{2}), of which 0.2 square miles (0.5 km^{2}), or 0.43%, are water. The Manistee River crosses the southeast corner of the township, flowing generally westerly toward Lake Michigan.

== Demographics ==
As of the census of 2000, there were 362 people, 144 households, and 117 families residing in the township. The population density was 10.2 inhabitants per square mile (3.9/km^{2}). There were 222 housing units at an average density of 6.3 per square mile (2.4/km^{2}). The racial makeup of the township was 96.96% White, 1.38% Native American, 0.55% from other races, and 1.10% from two or more races. Hispanic or Latino of any race were 0.83% of the population.

There were 144 households, out of which 27.1% had children under the age of 18 living with them, 69.4% were married couples living together, 7.6% had a female householder with no husband present, and 18.8% were non-families. 13.9% of all households were made up of individuals, and 7.6% had someone living alone who was 65 years of age or older. The average household size was 2.51 and the average family size was 2.75.

In the township the population was spread out, with 22.4% under the age of 18, 5.2% from 18 to 24, 22.9% from 25 to 44, 34.0% from 45 to 64, and 15.5% who were 65 years of age or older. The median age was 45 years. For every 100 females, there were 100.0 males. For every 100 females age 18 and over, there were 95.1 males.

The median income for a household in the township was $40,000, and the median income for a family was $40,341. Males had a median income of $34,375 versus $21,250 for females. The per capita income for the township was $17,643. About 6.2% of families and 5.8% of the population were below the poverty line, including none of those under age 18 and 14.8% of those age 65 or over.
