= Williamsport, Michigan =

- Settlement
- Location within the state of Michigan
- Coordinates: 44°21′30″N 86°15′50″W
- Country: United States
- State: Michigan
- County: Manistee
- Township: Onekama
- Elevation: 591 ft (180 m)
- Time zone: UTC-5 (Eastern (EST))
  - Summer (DST): UTC-4 (EDT)
- Area code: 231
- GNIS feature ID: 2106973

Williamsport is a place name in Onekama Township, Manistee County in the U.S. state of Michigan. It is located on the southwestern shore of Portage Lake at 44°21′30″N 86°15′50″W. and had its beginning in about 1871 when a channel was dug connecting Portage Lake with Lake Michigan. The place name has been used on maps of Michigan since 1871 and throughout the 20th century, although no town ever developed.

The place takes its name from the steam tug Williams, which was the first vessel to enter the man-made cut on 15 May 1871. Landowners around Portage Lake made the cut in opposition to the owners of Portage Mill at Portage Point, who persisted in raising the level of the lake and flooding their lands.

The first supporters to develop Williamsport was A. T. Shanks, who was granted a license in June 1871 to operate a ferry across the channel for a period of ten years, charging five cents a person, fifteen cents for each horse and person, twenty cents for each person, horse, and wagon, and twenty-five cents for a two-horse conveyance.

William Shanks and his wife Annie operated a boarding house and picnic grounds at the site of Williamsport and platted their homestead land as a village. A saw mill was built at the site, but it burned shortly after construction and was never rebuilt. The move of the village from Portage Point to the present location of Onekama at the northeastern end of the lake quashed the Shankses' plans for the development of Williamsport.
