= Francis J. Hall =

American theologian and Episcopal priest

The Reverend Francis J. Hall
- Born: Francis Joseph Hall; December 24, 1857; Ashtabula, Ohio, US
- Died: March 12, 1932 (aged 74); Baldwinsville, New York, US
- Spouse: Prudence Griswold Hall

Ecclesiastical career
- Religion: Christianity (Anglican)
- Church: Episcopal Church (United States)
- Ordained: 1885 (deacon); 1886 (priest)

Academic background
- Education: Western Theological Seminary

Academic work
- Discipline: Theology
- Sub-discipline: Dogmatic theology; systematic theology
- School or tradition: Anglo-Catholicism
- Institutions: Western Theological Seminary; General Theological Seminary
- Notable works: Dogmatic Theology (1907–1922)

Francis Joseph Hall (1857–1932) was an American Episcopal theologian and priest in the Anglo-Catholic tradition. Hall was one of the first to attempt an Anglican systematic theology.

== Early life and education ==
Hall was born on December 24, 1857, in Ashtabula, Ohio, as the son of Joseph Badger Hall and Juliet Elizabeth Hall née Griswold and grandson of John Hall, an early missionary priest in Ohio and later rector of St Peter's Episcopal Church, Ashtabula. His great-grandfather was Roger Griswold. He was educated in the local schools in Ashtabula until 1866, when he and his parents moved to Chicago, Illinois. His grandfather, with his parents' permission, dedicated his life to the church at his birth. Upon completion of his education in the Chicago public schools, Hall entered Racine College in Racine, Wisconsin, where he graduated with a Bachelor of Arts degree in 1882 and a Master of Arts degree in 1885. Graduating as a candidate for holy orders, he went on to study at the General Theological Seminary in New York City and, after two years transferred to the Western Theological Seminary in Chicago (now Seabury-Western Theological Seminary).

== Career ==
Ordained a deacon at St. John's Chapel of Racine College on July 1, 1885, he was advanced to the priesthood in the Cathedral of Saints Peter and Paul on October 11, 1886, by William E. McLaren, Bishop of Chicago. After his diaconal ordination, he began teaching at Western Theological Seminary and in 1905 was appointed to a professorship of dogmatic theology. He was also registrar of the Diocese of Chicago from 1894 to 1913 and was church counsel in the trial of Algernon Sidney Crapsey in 1906. In 1913, General Theological Seminary elected him as its professor of dogmatic theology, a position he retained until his retirement in 1928. As a child he contracted scarlet fever, which handicapped him by partial deafness. In a midlife nervous breakdown, his deafness became total, but he continued to train more than a generation of future Episcopal priests and bishops.

In 1910 and in 1927, he was a delegate to the World Conferences on "Faith and Order". In 1923, he delivered an important paper at the Anglo-Catholic Conference in the interest of reunion, entitled "The Future of the Church".

Kenyon College awarded him an honorary Doctor of Divinity degree in 1898 and the General Theological Seminary awarded him an honorary Doctor of Sacred Theology degree.

== Summer ministry ==
In June 1902, Hall became one of the pioneer summer residents in Onekama, Michigan, on Portage Lake. He immediately purchased property and built a summer home that was completed during his first summer. Obtaining the permission of George D. Gillespie, the first Bishop of Western Michigan, Hall began to celebrate Holy Communion in the study of his summer home to a small group of friends and neighbors. In 1911, he purchased a lakefront lot and arranged for the construction of a chapel to his own design, which was dedicated on August 11, 1912, as the Chapel of St. John-by-the-Lake. Hall remained as priest-in-charge until October 1930, when he resigned no longer able to make the summer trip to Michigan.

The altar of the chapel is dedicated to Hall's memory. He died in Baldwinsville, New York, on March 12, 1932.

== Published works ==
- The Doctrine of God. Theological Outlines. Vol. 1. Milwaukee, Wisconsin: The Young Churchman Co. 1892. OCLC 40767391.
  - The Doctrine of God. Theological Outlines. Vol. 1 (2nd ed.). Milwaukee, Wisconsin: The Young Churchman Co. 1905 – via Disseminary.
- The Doctrine of Man and of the God-Man. Theological Outlines. Vol. 2. Milwaukee, Wisconsin: The Young Churchman Co. 1894. OCLC 19053266.
  - The Doctrine of Man and of the God-Man. Theological Outlines. Vol. 2 (2nd ed.). Milwaukee, Wisconsin: The Young Churchman Co. 1915 – via Disseminary.
- The Doctrine of the Church and of Last Things. Theological Outlines. Vol. 3. Milwaukee, Wisconsin: The Young Churchman Co. 1895. OCLC 29422496 – via Disseminary.
- The Historical Position of the Episcopal Church. Milwaukee, Wisconsin: The Young Churchman Co. 1895. OCLC 1046020498.
- The Kenotic Theory. New York: Longmans, Green and Co. 1898.
- Introduction to Dogmatic Theology. Vol. 1. New York: Longmans, Green and Co. 1907. hdl:2027/hvd.ah4qg8. OCLC 847931.
- Authority, Ecclesiastical and Biblical. Dogmatic Theology. Vol. 2. New York: Longmans, Green and Co. (published 1918). 1908. hdl:2027/yale.39002029677185. OCLC 702485952.
- A History of the Diocese of Chicago. Dixon, Illinois: De Witt C. Owen. 1909.
- The Being and Attributes of God. Dogmatic Theology. Vol. 3. New York: Longmans, Green and Co. 1909. hdl:2027/hvd.ah4qg9. OCLC 343431.
- Evolution and the Fall. New York: Longmans, Green and Co. 1910. OCLC 1045392133.
- The Trinity. Dogmatic Theology. Vol. 4. New York: Longmans, Green and Co. (published 1918). 1910. hdl:2027/yale.39002029677201. OCLC 40283052.
- Creation and Man. Dogmatic Theology. Vol. 5. New York: Longmans, Green and Co. 1912. hdl:2027/yale.39002029677227. OCLC 847952.
- The Incarnation. Dogmatic Theology. Vol. 6. New York: Longmans, Green and Co. 1915. OCLC 509607.
- The Bible and Modern Criticism. Milwaukee, Wisconsin: The Young Churchman Co. 1915. hdl:2027/hvd.32044023285992. OCLC 81317270.
- The Passion and Exaltation of Christ. Dogmatic Theology. Vol. 7. New York: Longmans, Green and Co. 1918. hdl:2027/mdp.39015064332466. OCLC 847963.
- The Church and the Sacramental System. Dogmatic Theology. Vol. 8. New York: Longmans, Green and Co. 1920. hdl:2027/hvd.ah4qgd. OCLC 847937.
- The Sacraments. Dogmatic Theology. Vol. 9. New York: Longmans, Green and Co. 1921. OCLC 250336395.
- Eschatology: Indexes. Dogmatic Theology. Vol. 10. New York: Longmans, Green and Co. 1922. hdl:2027/hvd.ah4qgg. OCLC 847973.
- Christianity and Modernism. New York: Edwin S. Gorham. 1924. hdl:2027/wu.89097216790. OCLC 5929433.
- Moral Theology. With Hallock, Frank H. New York: Longmans, Green and Co. 1924. hdl:2027/mdp.39015064335766. OCLC 5019798.
- Christian Union in Ecumenical Light. London: Society for Promoting Christian Knowledge. 1930. OCLC 717990922.
- The Catholic Faith and Modern Scholarship (in Japanese). Translated by Inagaki, Yoichiro. Tokyo: Church Publishing Society. 1934. OCLC 639350695.
