= Arcadia Township, Manistee County, Michigan =

Arcadia Township, Michigan
- Township
- Location within Michigan Location within the United States
- Coordinates: 44°29′11″N 86°13′17″W
- Country: United States
- State: Michigan
- County: Manistee

Area
  - Total: 19.0 sq mi (49 km^{2})
  - Land: 18.6 sq mi (48 km^{2})
  - Water: 0.4 sq mi (1.0 km^{2})
- Elevation: 719 ft (219 m)

Population (2020)
  - Total: 657
  - Density: 35.3/sq mi (13.6/km^{2})
- Time zone: UTC-5 (Eastern (EST))
  - Summer (DST): UTC-4 (EDT)
- ZIP codes: 49613 (Arcadia); 49614 (Bear Lake)
- Area code: 231
- FIPS code: 26-101-03320
- GNIS feature ID: 1625845
- Website: www.townshipofarcadia.org

Arcadia Township is a civil township of Manistee County in the U.S. state of Michigan. As of the 2020 census, the township population was 657.

== History ==
European settlement in Arcadia dates to 1866, when Dr. W. L. Dempster, G. W. Boss, and H. Huntington settled on Bar Lake, so named because a large sandbar separates it from Lake Michigan (the lake is now called Arcadia Lake). The township was organized soon after, in 1870. The village of Arcadia was founded in 1880.

In 1882 another village was founded on Bar Lake called Burnhamville and centered around a lumber mill. It had its own post office until 1895.

Arcadia's early history was dominated by Henry Starke, a Milwaukeean who established a lucrative lumber mill. Starke also established Trinity Lutheran Church, Arcadia's most prominent structure and a Michigan state historic site. The town thrived as a lumber town through the early 1900s. In 1906 Starke's lumber mill burned to the ground and was replaced by the Arcadia Furniture Factory.

The town is the birthplace of Harriet Quimby, America's first female aviator. This is memorialized by a Michigan historical marker.

For a list of other Michigan historical markers in the area, see Manistee County, Michigan.

== Geography ==
Arcadia Township occupies the northwest corner of Manistee County. It is bordered to the north by Benzie County and to the west by Lake Michigan. Neighboring Manistee County townships are Pleasanton Township to the east, Bear Lake Township touching the southeast corner, and Onekama Township to the south.

According to the United States Census Bureau, Arcadia Township has a total area of 19.0 square miles (49 km^{2}), of which 18.6 square miles (48 km^{2}) are land and 0.4 square miles (1.0 km^{2}), or 2.04%, are water.

M-22 is the primary thoroughfare within the township, running north–south.

== Communities ==
- Arcadia is an unincorporated community and census-designated place within the township, on the shore of Lake Michigan. Arcadia is located at 44°29′35″N 86°13′54″W. The elevation is 587 feet (179 m) above sea level. The ZIP code is 49613.

== Demographics ==
As of the census of 2000, there were 621 people, 280 households, and 197 families residing in the township. The population density was 33.3 inhabitants per square mile (12.9/km^{2}). There were 545 housing units at an average density of 29.3 per square mile (11.3/km^{2}). The racial makeup of the township was 98.55% White, 0.16% African American, 0.32% Native American, 0.16% Asian, 0.16% from other races, and 0.64% from two or more races. Hispanic or Latino of any race were 1.13% of the population.

There were 280 households, out of which 23.6% had children under the age of 18 living with them, 59.6% were married couples living together, 7.5% had a female householder with no husband present, and 29.6% were non-families. 25.0% of all households were made up of individuals, and 13.2% had someone living alone who was 65 years of age or older. The average household size was 2.20 and the average family size was 2.57.

In the township the population was spread out, with 19.6% under the age of 18, 3.2% from 18 to 24, 21.1% from 25 to 44, 31.9% from 45 to 64, and 24.2% who were 65 years of age or older. The median age was 49 years. For every 100 females, there were 87.6 males. For every 100 females age 18 and over, there were 94.9 males.

The median income for a household in the township was $34,844, and the median income for a family was $41,731. Males had a median income of $24,844 versus $22,813 for females. The per capita income for the township was $23,089. About 9.8% of families and 13.3% of the population were below the poverty line, including 25.0% of those under age 18 and 4.7% of those age 65 or over.
