= List of awards and nominations received by Orson Welles =

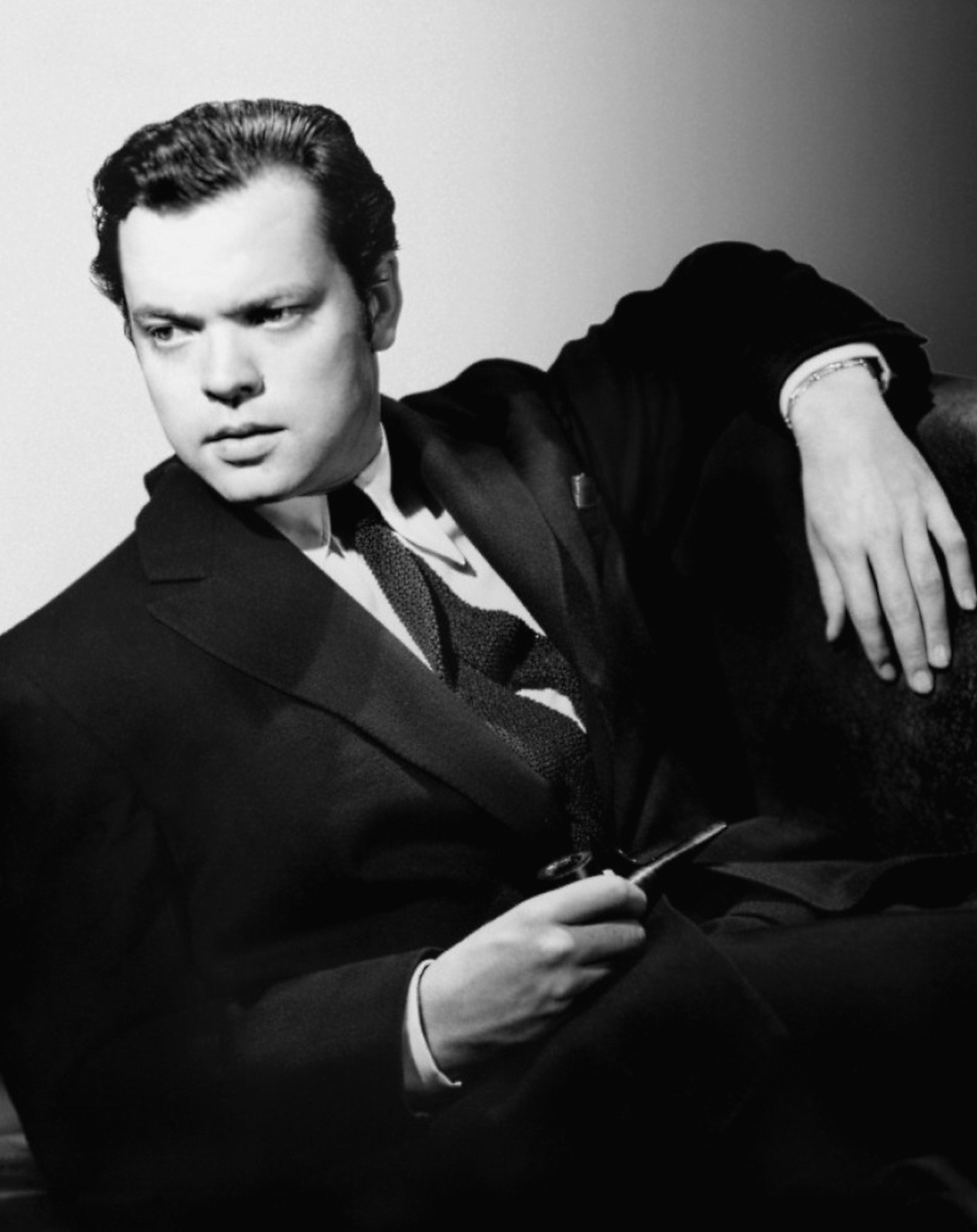
Orson Welles in 1941

Orson Welles was an American film director, actor, writer, and producer who is remembered for his innovative work in film, radio, and theatre. He is considered to be among the greatest and most influential filmmakers of all time. He received numerous accolades including an Academy Award, Peabody Award, and Grammy Award as well as nominations for a BAFTA Award and a Golden Globe Award.

He has also received numerous honors including the AFI Life Achievement Award in 1975, the British Film Institute Fellowship in 1983, and the Directors Guild of America Lifetime Achievement Award in 1984. He was inducted into both the National Association of Broadcasters Hall of Fame in 1979, and the National Radio Hall of Fame in 1988. Welles was presented with France's Legion of Honour in 1982.

== Major associations ==
=== Academy Awards ===
| Year | Category | Nominated work | Result | Ref. |
|---|---|---|---|---|
| 1941 | Best Director | Citizen Kane | Nominated | |
| 1941 | Best Actor | Citizen Kane | Nominated | |
| 1941 | Best Original Screenplay | Citizen Kane | Won | |
| 1970 | Academy Honorary Award | | Received | |

Directed Academy Award performances
Under Welles' direction, these actors have received Academy Award nominations for their performances in their respective roles.

| Year | Performer | Film | Result |
Academy Award for Best Actor
| 1941 | Himself | Citizen Kane | Nominated |
Academy Award for Best Supporting Actress
| 1942 | Agnes Moorehead | The Magnificent Ambersons | Nominated |

=== BAFTA Awards ===
| Year | Category | Nominated work | Result | Ref. |
|---|---|---|---|---|
| 1968 | Best Foreign Actor | Chimes at Midnight | Nominated | |

=== Golden Globe Awards ===
| Year | Category | Nominated work | Result | Ref. |
|---|---|---|---|---|
| 1981 | Best Supporting Actor in a Motion Picture | Butterfly | Nominated | |

=== Grammy Awards ===
| Year | Category | Nominated work | Result | Ref. |
|---|---|---|---|---|
| 1971 | Best Comedy Album | The Begatting of the President | Nominated | |
| 1976 | Best Spoken Word Album | Immortal Sherlock Holmes | Nominated | |
| 1977 | Best Spoken Word Album | Great American Documents | Nominated | |
| 1979 | Best Spoken Word Album | Citizen Kane | Nominated | |
| 1980 | Best Spoken Word Album | Orson Welles & Helen Hayes at Their Best | Nominated | |
| 1981 | Best Spoken Word Album | Obediently Yours | Nominated | |
| 1982 | Best Spoken Word Album | Donovan's Brain | Won | |
| 1993 | Best Spoken Word Album | This is Orson Welles | Nominated | |

== Miscellaneous accolades ==
=== Cannes Film Festival ===
| Year | Category | Nominated work | Result | Ref. |
|---|---|---|---|---|
| 1952 | Palme d'Or | Othello | Won | |
| 1959 | Best Actor | Compulsion | Won | |
| 1966 | Tribute | Chimes at Midnight | received | |
| 1966 | C.S.T. Prize | Chimes at Midnight | received | |
| 1966 | Palme d'Or | Chimes at Midnight | Nominated | |

=== Los Angeles Film Critics Association ===
| Year | Category | Nominated work | Result | Ref. |
|---|---|---|---|---|
| 1978 | Career Achievement Award | Orson Welles | Received | |

=== National Board of Review ===
| Year | Category | Nominated work | Result | Ref. |
|---|---|---|---|---|
| 1942 | Best Actor | Citizen Kane | Won | |

=== New York Film Critics Circle ===
| Year | Category | Nominated work | Result | Ref. |
|---|---|---|---|---|
| 1941 | Best Picture | Citizen Kane | Won | |

=== Venice Film Festival ===
| Year | Category | Nominated work | Result | Ref. |
|---|---|---|---|---|
| 1947 | Golden Lion | The Stranger | Nominated | |
| 1962 | Golden Lion | The Trial | Nominated | |
| 1970 | Golden Lion | Career Achievement | Received | |

== Honorary awards ==
| Year | Association | Award | Ref. |
|---|---|---|---|
| 1933 | Chicago Drama League Prize for Twelfth Night | Recipient | |
| 1945 | Interracial Film and Radio Guild Award for Contributions to Interracial Harmony through Radio | Recipient | |
| 1938 | The New York Drama Study Club Award | Recipient | |
| 1939 | Essex County Symphony Society's Achievement Award | Recipient | |
| 1958 | Peabody Award for The Fountain of Youth | Recipient | |
| 1972 | American Theater Hall of Fame | Inaugural member | |
| 1975 | American Film Institute Lifetime Achievement Award | Recipient | |
| 1979 | National Association of Broadcasters Broadcasting Hall of Fame | Induction | |
| 1982 | Order of Commander of the Légion d'honneur | Recipient | |
| 1983 | Académie des Beaux-Arts | Inducted | |
| 1983 | British Film Institute Fellowship | Recipient | |
| 1984 | Directors Guild of America's D. W. Griffith Award | Recipient | |
| 1984 | The Academy of Magical Arts | Special Fellowship | |
| 1985 | National Board of Review Career Achievement Award | Recipient | |
| 1988 | National Radio Hall of Fame | Inducted | |

== Special recognitions ==
- 1958: Although Universal Pictures did its best to prevent Touch of Evil from being selected for the 1958 Brussels World Film Festival—part of the Expo 58 world's fair—the film received its European premiere and Welles was invited to attend. To his astonishment, Welles collected the two top awards. Touch of Evil received the International Critics Prize, and Welles was recognized for his body of work.
- 1963: He reiceved the International Federation of Film Critics (FIPRESCI) for The Trial, at the Festival international du film de Valladolid and Best Film" by the French Syndicate of Cinema Critics in 1964.
- 1998: In 1998 and 2007, the American Film Institute ranked Citizen Kane as the greatest American movie. These other Welles films were nominated for the AFI list: The Magnificent Ambersons (1942, director/producer/screenwriter); The Third Man (1949, actor); Touch of Evil (1958, actor/director/screenwriter); and A Man for All Seasons (1966, actor).
- 1999: The American Film Institute acknowledged Welles as one of the top 25 male motion picture stars of Classic Hollywood cinema in its survey, AFI's 100 Years...100 Stars.
- 2002: Welles was voted the greatest film director of all time in two British Film Institute polls, of directors and critics.
- 2002: A highly divergent genus of Hawaiian spiders Orsonwelles was named in his honor.
- 2003: A crater on Mars was named in his honor.
- 2007: A statue of Welles sculpted by Oja Kodar was installed in the city of Split, Croatia.
- 2013: On February 10, 2013, the Woodstock Opera House in Woodstock, Illinois, dedicated its stage to Welles, honoring the site of his American debut as a professional theatre director.
- 2015: Throughout 2015, numerous festivals and events observed the 100th anniversary of Welles's birth.
- 2017: A survey of critical consensus, best-of lists, and historical retrospectives finds Welles to be the second most acclaimed director of all time (behind Alfred Hitchcock).
