= Red Park, Michigan =

- Unincorporated community
- Location within the state of Michigan
- Coordinates: 44°21′07″N 86°14′34″W
- Country: United States
- State: Michigan
- County: Manistee
- Township: Onekama
- Elevation: 584 ft (178 m)
- Time zone: UTC-5 (Eastern (EST))
  - Summer (DST): UTC-4 (EDT)
- Area code: 231
- GNIS feature ID: 1621359

Red Park is an unincorporated summer resort area of Onekama Township, Manistee County in the U.S. state of Michigan. It is located on the south shore of Portage Lake at 44°21′07″N 86°14′34″W, between Wick-A-Te-Wah on the West and next to Camp Tosebo.

== History ==
Red Park was established in the early 1900s by a man named Davis as a summer resort colony for people in Manistee, Michigan. The original resort consisted of a small store operated by Mr. and Mrs. James Sandenberg, the only permanent residents, who also acted as the caretaker of the collection of small summer cottages. A bandstand was built in the center of the resort, before 1910.

== Early summer residents ==
Among the earliest summer residents of this area were the following families:

- Cron
- Probeck
- Shaw
- Hollowed

Sands
