= Wick-A-Te-Wah, Michigan =

- Unincorporated community
- Location within the state of Michigan
- Coordinates: 44°21′21″N 86°13′26″W
- Country: United States
- State: Michigan
- County: Manistee
- Township: Onekama
- Elevation: 587 ft (179 m)
- Time zone: UTC-5 (Eastern (EST))
  - Summer (DST): UTC-4 (EDT)
- Area code: 231
- GNIS feature ID: 1622152

Wick-A-Te-Wah (or Wic-a-te-wah) is an unincorporated summer resort area of Onekama Township, Manistee County in the U.S. state of Michigan. It is located on the south shore of Portage Lake at 44°21′21″N 86°13′26″W, between the Portage Lake Bible Camp Camp Delight on the east and Red Park on the west.

== History ==
Mr. H. Ward Leonard, a developer from Manistee, developed this area as a summer resort in the early 1900s. In 1917, Leonard issued a brochure describing the property and the availability of lots for sale.

== Festivities ==
The annual Fourth of July Wick-A-Te-Wah Parade draws considerable crowds and extensive neighborhood participation.
