= Old Facefull =

Spring location in the US state of Michigan

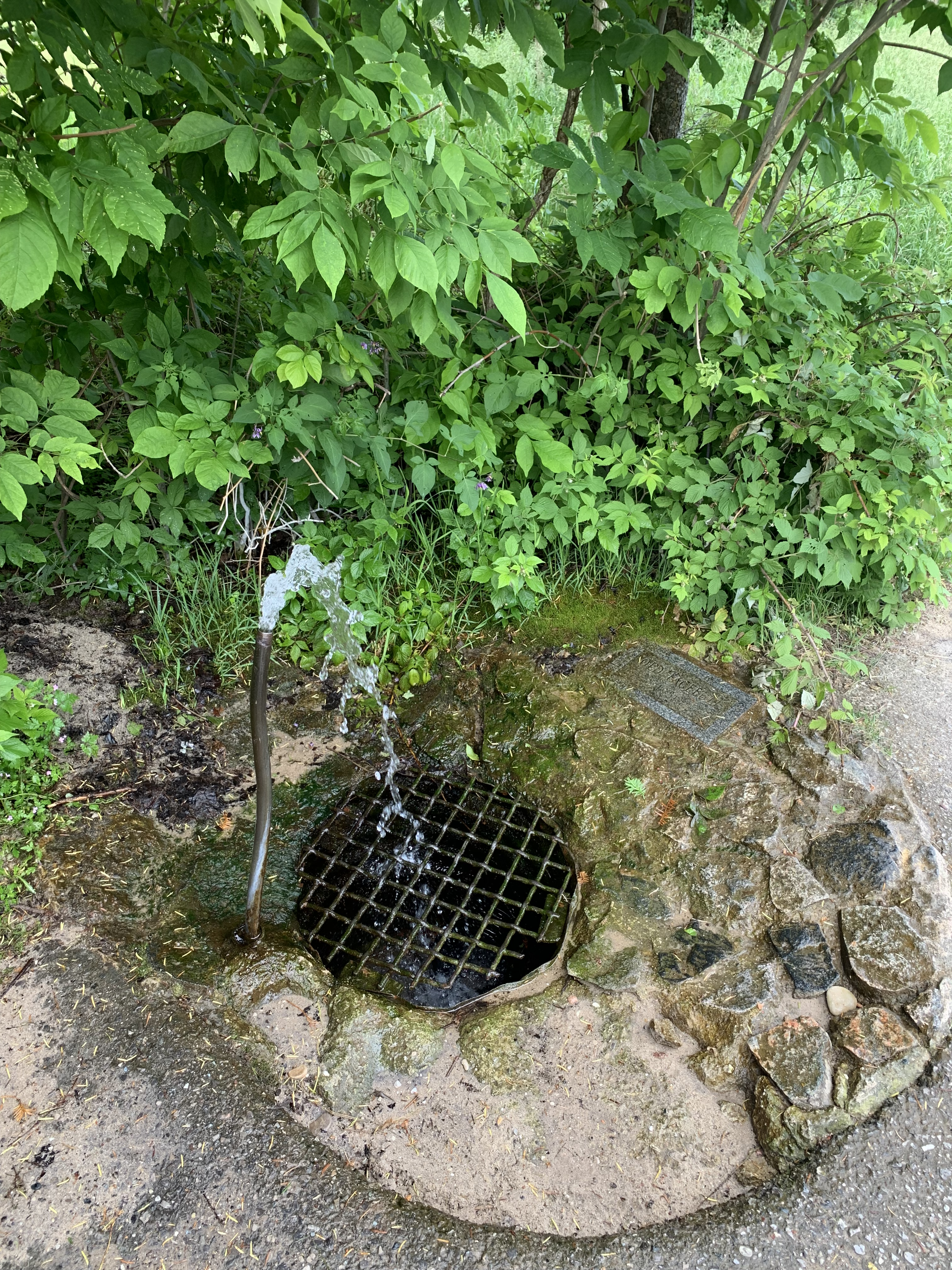
- Old Facefull

- Location within Michigan Location within the United States
- Interactive map of Old Facefull
- Location: Pierport, Michigan
- Coordinates: 44.427°N 86.247°W
- Elevation: 183 metres (600 ft)
- Type: Spring
- Provides water for: Lake Michigan

Old Facefull is an artesian spring located in the town of Pierport, Michigan, near the Lake Michigan shoreline. People have used the spring since at least 1931. In addition to the spring's practical uses, people have used this spot to refill fresh water while traveling.
