= Arcadia, Michigan =

- Census-designated place (CDP) & unincorporated community
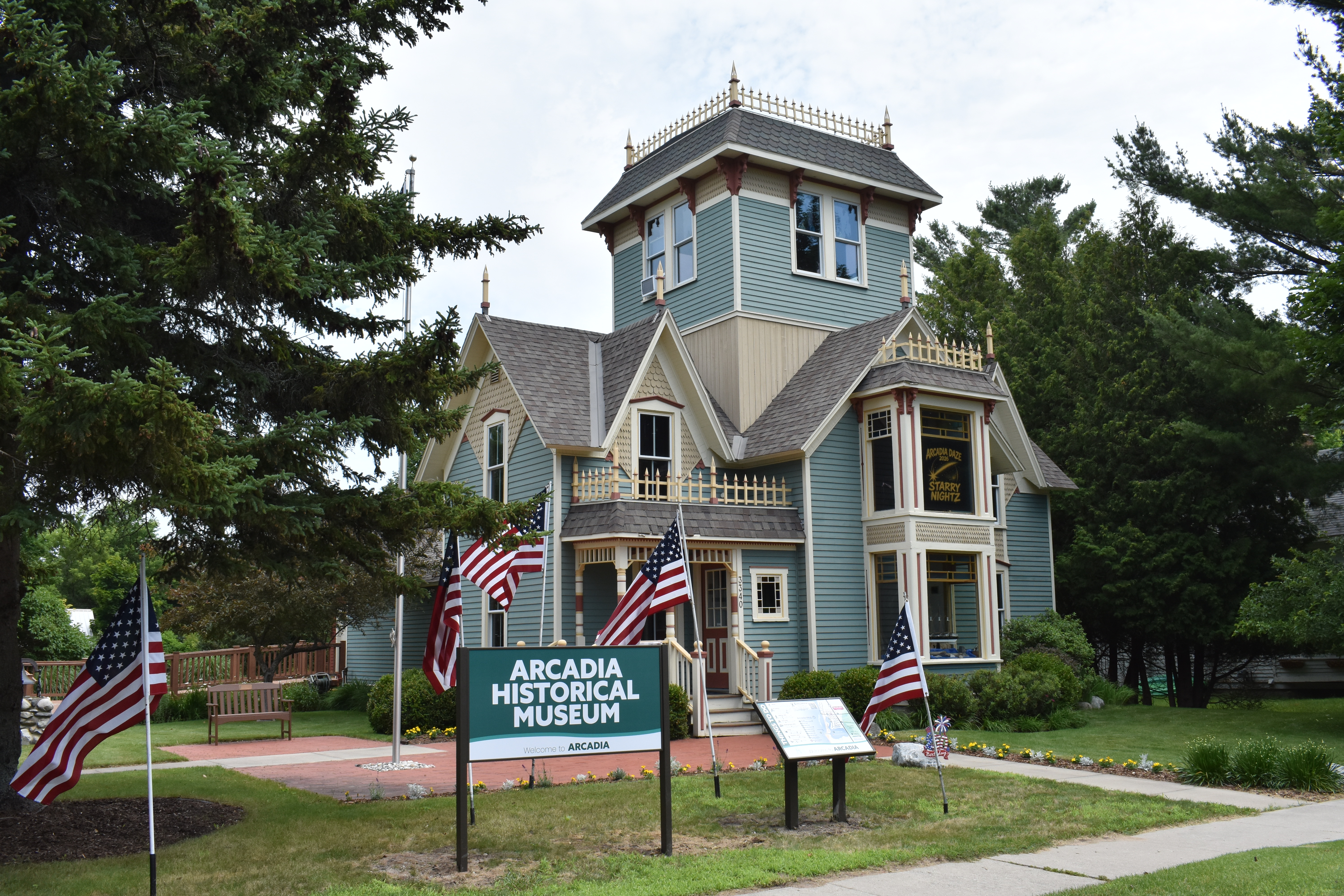
- Arcadia Historical Society

- Location within Michigan Location within the United States
- Coordinates: 44°29′35″N 86°13′54″W
- Country: United States
- State: Michigan
- County: Manistee
- Township: Arcadia

Area
  - Total: 1.55 km^{2} (0.60 sq mi)
  - Land: 1.55 km^{2} (0.60 sq mi)
  - Water: 0.00 km^{2} (0 sq mi)
- Elevation: 181 m (594 ft)

Population (2020)
  - Total: 309
  - Density: 199.46/km^{2} (516.6/sq mi)
- Time zone: UTC-5 (Eastern (EST))
  - Summer (DST): UTC-4 (EDT)
- ZIP code: 49613
- Area code: 231
- GNIS feature ID: 620195
- FIPS code: 26-03300

Arcadia is an unincorporated community and census-designated place (CDP) in Arcadia Township, Manistee County, Michigan, United States. Its population was 309 as of the 2020 census. The community is located along M-22 and the Lake Michigan shore. Arcadia has a post office with ZIP code 49613.

== Geography ==
Arcadia is in northwestern Manistee County and is bordered to the west by Lake Michigan and to the south by Arcadia Lake, connected to the larger lake by an artificial channel. Arcadia Lake is connected to one of Michigan's only natural marshes, the "Arcadia Marsh," which has Bowens Creek running through it. Arcadia Marsh is a nature reserve and is a large part of Arcadia's natural ecosystem. Highway M-22 passes through the community, leading north 10 miles (16 km) to Elberta and south the same distance to Onekama. Manistee, the county seat, is 23 miles (37 km) to the south.

According to the U.S. Census Bureau, the Arcadia CDP has an area of 0.60 square miles (1.6 km^{2}), all land.

== Demographics ==
Historical population
| Census | Pop. | Note | %± |
|---|---|---|---|
| 2010 | 291 | | — |
| 2020 | 309 | | 6.2% |
U.S. Decennial Census

In 2022 its poverty rate was 10.7%, its median household income was $77500, and its median property value was $247200. In 2022 its citizenship was at 98.7%.

== Famous residents ==
Aviator Harriet Quimby was born in Arcadia.
