= Chapel of St. John-by-the-Lake (Onekama, Michigan) =

Chapel in Onekama, Michigan, US

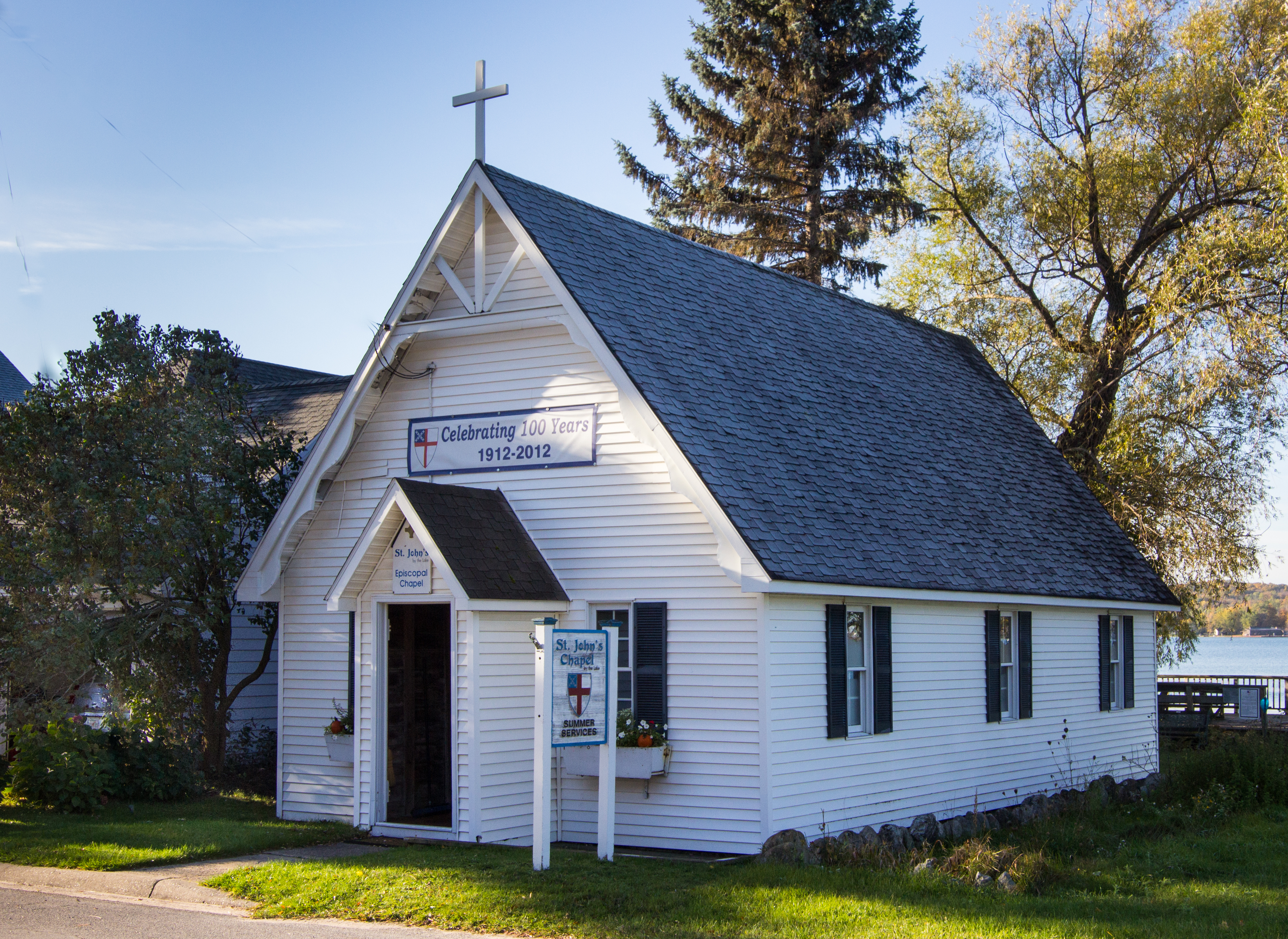
- Chapel of St. John-by-the-Lake, October 2018

- Location within Michigan
- 44.3650°N 86.2096°W
- Location: 4659 Main Street, Onekama, MI

History
- Built: 1912

The Chapel of St. John-by-the-Lake on Main Street (M-22) in Onekama, Michigan, US, is a summer chapel of the Protestant Episcopal Church in the Episcopal Diocese of The Great Lakes. A 9 a.m. study service is conducted during the summer months by a members of the clergy in the diocese who utilize a nearby cottage for a vacation period on a rotating basis. The chapel retains its original, century-old rustic interior and its original pine pews.

== History ==
The chapel was established by the Rev. Dr Francis J. Hall, who first came to Onekama as a summer resident in 1902, when he was Professor of Dogmatic Theology at Western Theological Seminary (later Seabury-Western Theological Seminary). By permission of the first bishop of Western Michigan, Hall first conducted services in the study of his summer home. In 1911, Hall purchased from Marvin Farr. a 25-foot-wide (7.6 m) waterfront lot along Onekama's Main Street. With $502.00 in donations, he engaged A.D. McCormick to construct the chapel according to Hall's own design and specifications. Completed in summer 1912, the total cost of construction, including the pews, came to $709.81.

The chapel was consecrated on August 11, 1912, by the Rt. Rev. John N. McCormick, Bishop of Western Michigan with the assistance of Hall, the first priest-in-charge, who in the following year became Professor of Dogmatic Theology at the General Theological Seminary in New York City. He remained in charge until 1930.

The chapel as designated as a "chapel-at-ease" under the immediate jurisdiction of the Bishop of Western Michigan and managed by an executive committee that included Hall. In 1918, with the approval of the committee, Hall purchased nearby property on which to build a summer cottage to serve a two-fold purpose: first to provide a source of rental income for the benefit of the chapel and second, to provide a place that minimum-salaried clergy, who could not otherwise afford a vacation, could use and who, in return for the privilege, would conduct Sunday services. The cottage was built in 1924 and Hall conveyed it to the diocese free of all indebtedness. The present street address of the house is 8342 First Street, Onekama.

In 1984, the chapel obtained rights to an oil well under Portage Lake and this produced some income for several years, allowing for basic repairs and maintenance to take place. In 1986, a seawall was constructed to protect the small lot from lake erosion during high water. In 1991, a waterside deck was constructed, and replaced in 2012.

A member of the chapel, Thomas R. Bambas, professor emeritus of art at Central Michigan University, designed the beautiful metalwork in the chapel, including the cross over the altar, altar candlesticks, cruets and a ciborium.

== Leadership ==
The following individuals have been priest-in-charge or the chairperson of the chapel committee:

- 1912–30: The Rev. Dr. Francis J. Hall
- 1935–52: The Rev. Donald V. Carey; rector Grace Episcopal Church, Grand Rapids, Michigan, 1937–52
- 1957–67: The Rev. Cleon E. Bigler; rector, All Saints Episcopal Church, Western Springs, Illinois, 1928–59
- Betty Johnson
- 1984–2002: Chrissie Mathews
- 2003–07: Gini Mulligan
- 2007–present: The Rev. D. Edward Emenheiser; rector, Grace Episcopal Church, Traverse City, Michigan, 1994-2008
