= Portage Lake (Michigan) =

Lake in the state of Michigan, United States

- Location within Michigan Location within the United States
- Location: Onekama Township, Manistee County, Michigan
- Coordinates: 44°21′36″N 086°14′25″W
- Type: natural lake
- Basin countries: United States
- Max. length: 3 miles (4.8 km)
- Max. width: 1.5 miles (2.4 km) maximum
- Surface area: 2,110 acres (850 ha)
- Max. depth: 60 feet (18 m)
- Surface elevation: 581 feet (177 m)
- Settlements: Onekama; Portage Point; Wick-A-Te-Wah; Red Park; Williamsport

Portage Lake is a natural lake, located in Onekama Township in Manistee County, Michigan, United States. The village of Onekama, Michigan is situated at the northeastern end of the lake.

== History ==
The Lake was first identified as Portage Lake in 1837, when Joseph Stronach named the natural stream at Portage Point that flowed into Lake Michigan as Portage Creek. In that same year, the U.S. Government survey identified the lake as "O-nek-a-ma-engk or Portage Lake". The 26th Congress first published this survey information. The first map to show and to name the lake was entitled "The State of Michigan and the Surrounding Country," published by John Farmer of Detroit in 1844.

The lake was first formed during the Wisconsinian glacial age (10,000 to 75,000 years ago) as an arm of Lake Michigan that later closed. It has a 15,808-acre (6,397 ha) watershed with a number of ground-fed small streams.

In more recent times and up until May 14, 1871, the lake was a landlocked body of water with a water level about 12 to 14 feet (3.7 to 4.3 m) above the level of Lake Michigan. On that date in 1871, homesteaders around the lake, who had objected to the practices of the saw mill owner at Portage in raising the lake level to power their saw mill, dug a channel through the narrow isthmus about a mile south of the natural outlet at Portage Creek.

This new man-made channel lowered the level of Portage Lake to that of Lake Michigan and dried out Portage Creek. As a result of this, the small community at Portage relocated to the previously submerged far northeastern corner of Portage Lake under its official new post office name, Onekama, in 1871. The man who had managed the Portage Mill, Augustine W. Farr became the key figure in establishing the town in its new location and in beginning to lobby for the designation of Portage Lake as a harbor of refuge.

On the day following the opening of the channel in May 1871, the first vessel to enter Portage Lake from Lake Michigan was the tugboat Williams. In honor of this, the area on the south side at the Portage Lake was named Williamsport, Michigan, but due to the development of Onekama at the far end of the Portage Lake, Williamsport, Michigan never developed as had been originally hoped.

In 1878, the United States Congress recognized the desire to survey the lake as a first step toward developing a harbor of refuge, as there was no safe harbor in a westerly gale in an 80-mile (130 km) stretch of coastline between Ludington, Michigan and South Manitou Island. Congress appropriated the first funds to develop the Portage Lake harbor of refuge in 1879 and work continued on and off for decades.

== Lighthouse ==
The first light was established on the pier head in 1891. In 1893, the channel had a depth of 8.5 feet (2.6 m) with north and south piers 500 feet (150 m) long with a red light on a 23-foot (7.0 m) high pole. The first and only resident lighthouse keeper at Portage Lake Light was John Langland, who served from 1891 to 1917. In 1899 River and Harbors Act provided for the first time to put harbor works under continuous contract. At that point, plans were laid to dredge the channel to a depth of 18 feet (5.5 m) and to extend the north and south piers.

By 1914, steam ships of the Northern Michigan Transportation Company and the Pere Marquette Line regularly called at the Portage Point Inn, bringing passengers from Chicago and Milwaukee.

== Yacht clubs ==
The first yacht club established on Portage Lake was the Onekama Sailing Club established in 1896 and which survived until about 1910. This club was located on an acre of land at the southeast end of Portage Lake.

About 1936, the Portage Lake Yacht Club was established for small boat sailing on the Lake and was initially located at the Portage Point Inn. Organized by Murray Campbell, George Cartland, Walter Hardy, Lewis Hardy, Homer Hattendorf, John Heskett, Bill Smythe, the Tomlinsons, Leonard Vaughan, Warren Vaughan, and others, particularly their active sailing children.

The club was incorporated in 1946 and a small club house was built on Portage Point near the Portage Lake end of the North pier at the end of Portage Point Drive. The club has continued to award the Pabst Cup, which was originally donated by the Pabst Brewery to the Onekama Sailing Club. They also have weekly sunfish races.

== Shipwrecks ==
There are two known shipwrecks located inside Portage Lake:

- The tugboat Lewis Wallace, which burned and sank in the small bay at the west end of Portage Lake between the east end of the North Channel pier and the present site of the Portage Lake Yacht Club on 22 September 1893. Classified as a wooden, propeller-driven steam tug (Official number 16625), she had been built in 1865 by Barbage in Grand Haven, Michigan, and originally was named Miranda. After a fire in 1879, she was rebuilt at Saginaw, Michigan, and renamed Lewis Wallace. She had an overall length of 54 feet (16.5 m), a beam of 16 feet (4.9 m), and a draft of 7 feet (2.1 m).
- The steamer Music which burned and sank, a total loss, on a bar south of North Point (Andy's Point) near the middle of the lake. She caught fire at the pier in Onekama and was cast adrift, burning like a torch as she drifted westward out into the lake on 30 August 1899. Built as an excursion boat by McMillan in South Haven, Michigan, in 1892 (Official number 92421), she was classified as a wooden, propeller-driven steam tug, and had an overall length of 93 feet (28.3 m), a beam of 21 feet (6.4 m), and an 8-foot (2.4 m) draft.

== Modern conditions and facilities ==
In 2008, Portage Lake has three facilities for yachtsmen:

- Onekama Marine
- Portage Lake Marina
- Portage Point Inn & Yacht Club

The current chart of Portage Lake is NOAA Nautical Chart Great Lakes # 14939

== See also ==
- Kalamazoo Superfund Site
- List of lakes in Michigan
