= Orchard Beach State Park =

Park in Manistee Township, Michigan, US

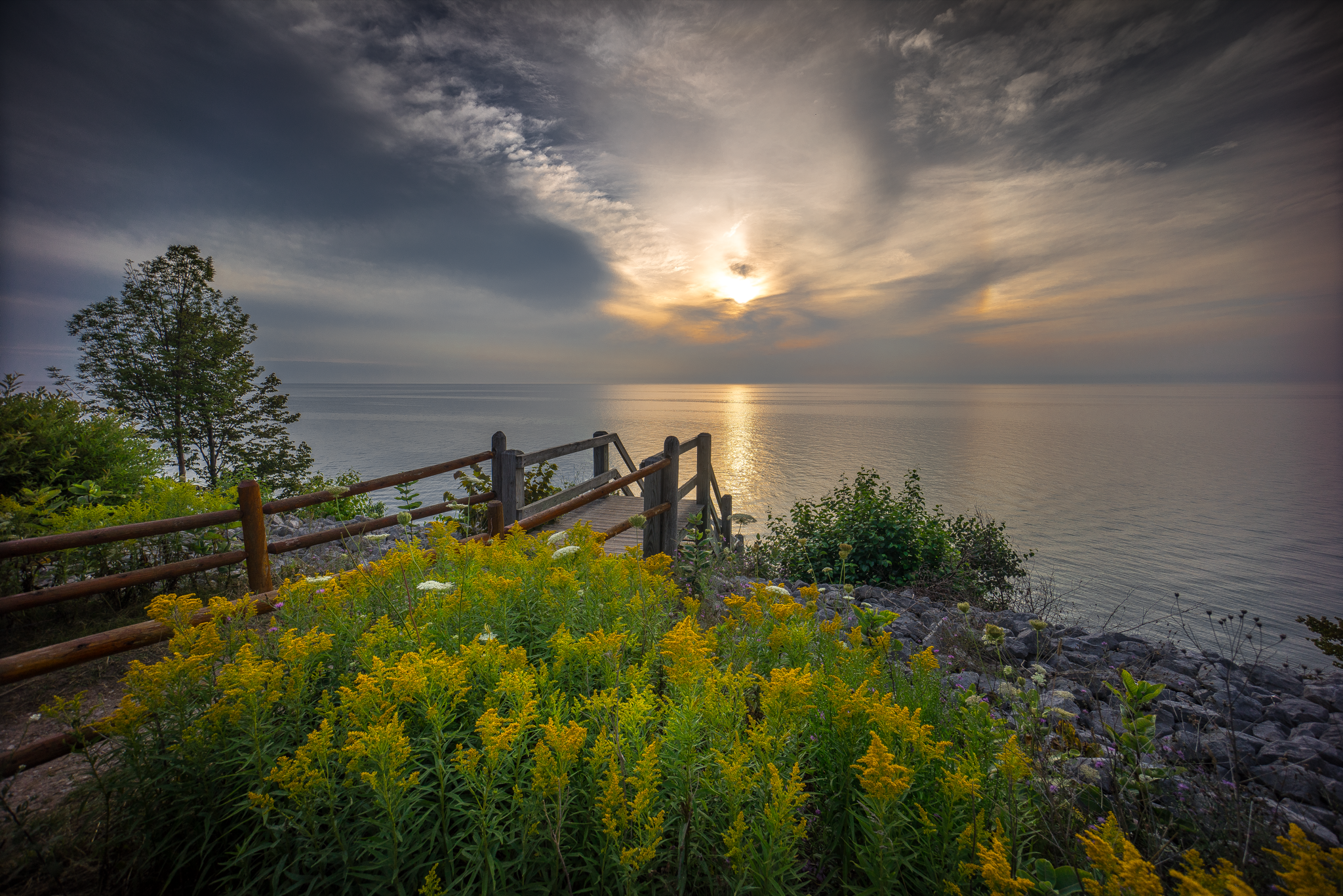
- Stairs and sky at Orchard Beach State Park

- Location within Michigan Location within the United States
- Location: Manistee County, Michigan, United States
- Nearest city: Manistee, Michigan
- Coordinates: 44°16′55″N 86°19′00″W
- Area: 201 acres (81 ha)
- Elevation: 650 feet (200 m)
- Established: 1921
- Administrator: Michigan Department of Natural Resources
- Website: Official website
- Orchard Beach State Park
- U.S. National Register of Historic Places
- Built: Civilian Conservation Corps
- NRHP reference No.: 09001064
- Added to NRHP: December 8, 2009

Orchard Beach State Park is a public recreation area covering 201 acres (81 ha) on the shore of Lake Michigan in Manistee Township, Manistee County, Michigan. Situated on a bluff three miles north of the city of Manistee, the state park offers camping, hiking trails, and scenic views over Lake Michigan.

== History ==
The park was developed by the Manistee, Filer City and Eastlake Railway Company and opened in 1892. After the company stopped trolley service to the park, the site was purchased by the Manistee Board of Commerce and deeded to the state to become part of the Michigan state park system in 1921.

The Civilian Conservation Corps was active in the park in the 1930s. Corps efforts included construction of several limestone structures including a pavilion, toilet, line house, and pump house. In 2009, the park was listed on the U.S. National Register of Historic Places, being cited as "one of the most intact examples of a Michigan state park developed in the 1930s and 1940s under National Park Service guidelines.... retain[ing] the majority of its CCC-era buildings and physical layout."

In 2019, the high levels of Lake Michigan were eroding the sandy bluff on which the CCC-built pavilion stood, threatening its destruction. The pavilion was moved away from the shore in December 2020.

== Activities and amenities ==
The park offers three miles of hiking trails, picnicking facilities, and a 166-site campground. The beach has been closed due to high lake levels.
