= Manistee County, Michigan =

County in Michigan, United States

- County
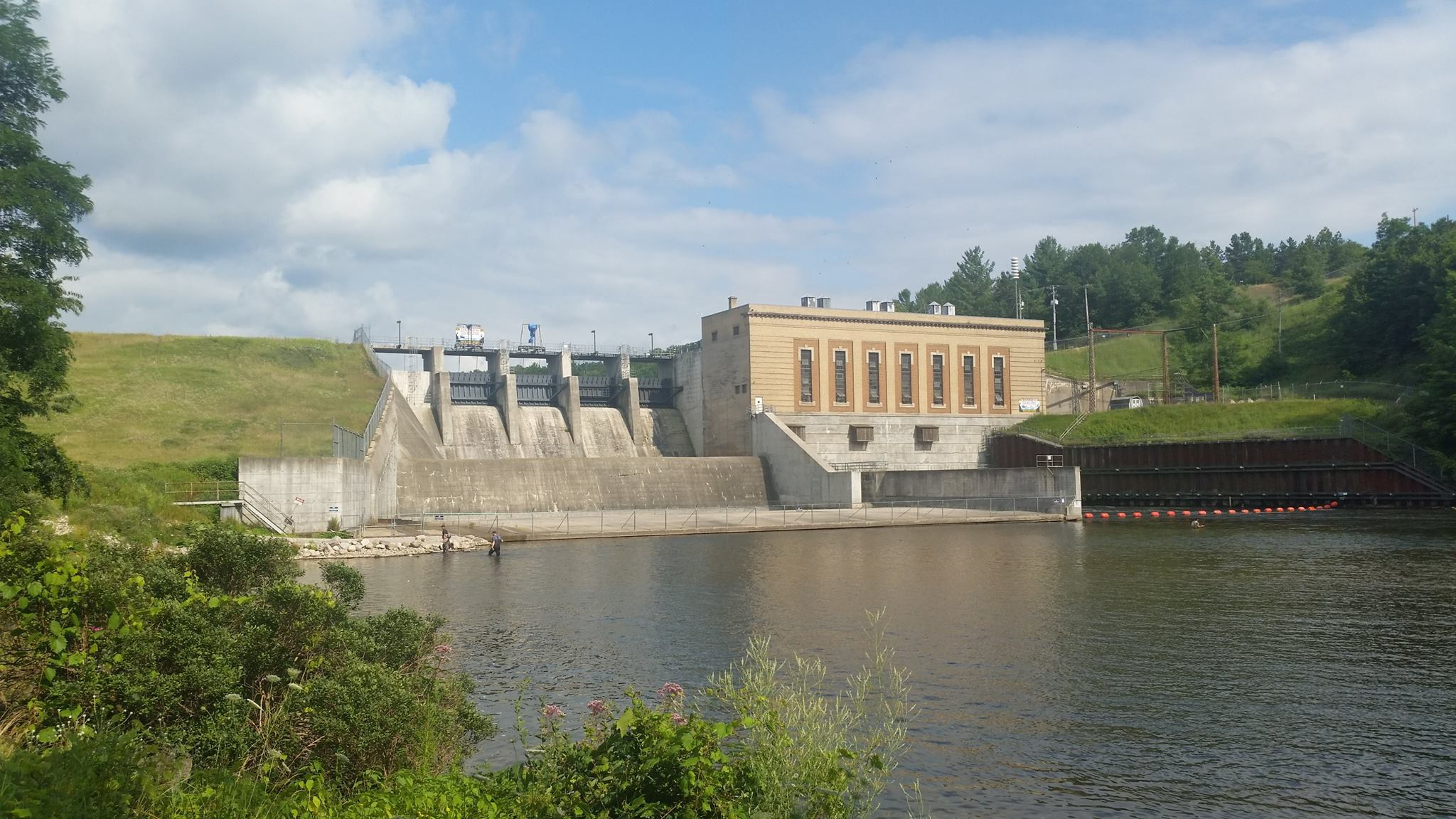
- Tippy Dam on the Manistee River

- Location within the U.S. state of Michigan
- Coordinates: 44°18′N 86°19′W
- Country: United States
- State: Michigan
- Founded: 1840
- Organized: 1855
- Seat: Manistee
- Largest city: Manistee

Area
  - Total: 1,281 sq mi (3,320 km^{2})
  - Land: 542 sq mi (1,400 km^{2})
  - Water: 738 sq mi (1,910 km^{2}) 58%

Population (2020)
  - Total: 25,032
  - Estimate (2025): 25,656 ▲
  - Density: 46/sq mi (18/km^{2})
- Time zone: UTC−5 (Eastern)
  - Summer (DST): UTC−4 (EDT)
- Congressional district: 2nd
- Website: www.manisteecountymi.gov

Manistee County (/mænɪsti/ man-iss-TEE) is a county located in the U.S. state of Michigan. As of the 2020 census, the population was 25,032. The county seat is Manistee. The county is named for the Manistee River. Manistee County is part of Northern Michigan and has a shoreline on Lake Michigan.

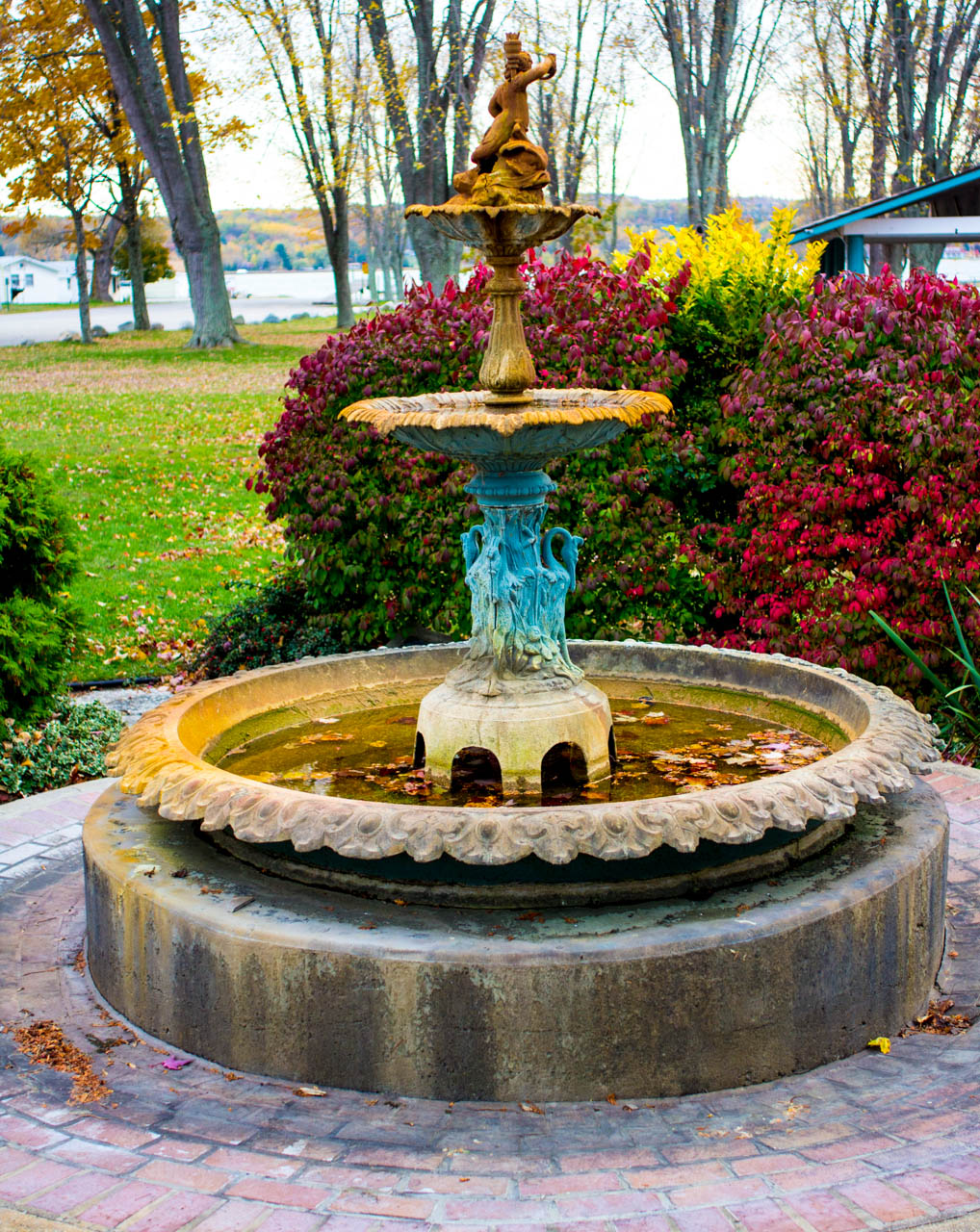
Manistee County Courthouse Fountain

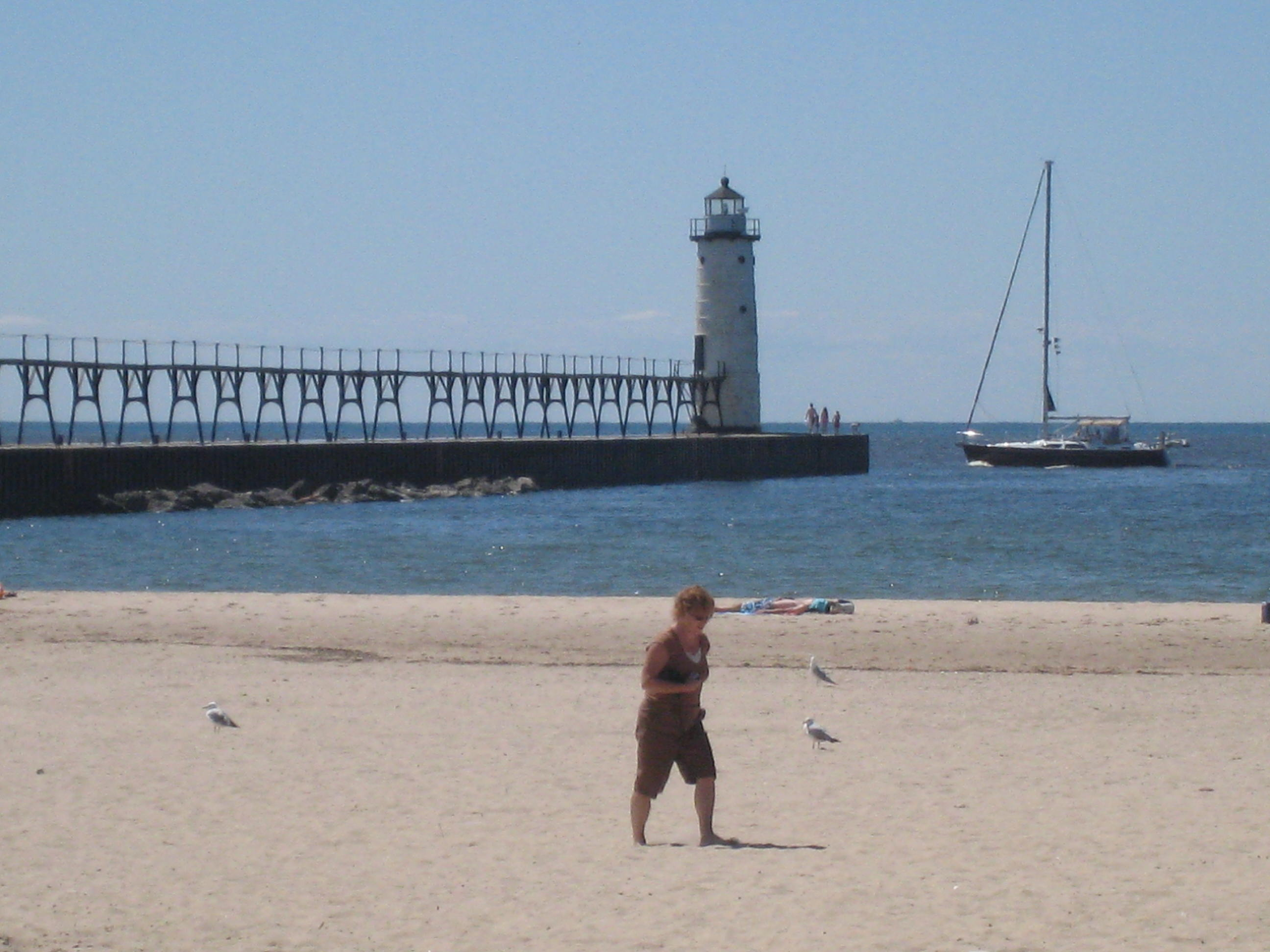
The Manistee North Pierhead Lighthouse on Lake Michigan in Manistee

== History ==
Manistee County was set off in 1840 from Michilimackinac County as an unorganized county. In 1851, it was attached to Grand Traverse County for legal purposes. Manistee County was organized in its own right on February 13, 1855.

=== Etymology ===
The name "Manistee" is from an Ojibwe word first applied to the principal river of the county. The derivation is not certain, but it may be from ministigweyaa, "river with islands at its mouth".

=== Historical markers ===
There are thirteen recognized Michigan historical markers in the county:

- Harriet Quimby Childhood Home
- John J. Makinen Bottle House
- First Congregational Church, Manistee
- Great Fire of 1871
- Holy Trinity Episcopal Church
- Holy Trinity Episcopal Church Rectory
- Kaleva, Michigan
- Manistee City Library
- Manistee Fire Hall
- Our Saviour's Lutheran Church
- Ramsdell Theatre
- Trinity Lutheran Church [Arcadia]
- William Douglas House

== Geography ==
According to the U.S. Census Bureau, the county has a total area of 1,281 square miles (3,320 km^{2}), of which 542 square miles (1,400 km^{2}) is land and 738 square miles (1,910 km^{2}) (58%) is water. Manistee County is considered to be part of Northern Michigan.

=== Adjacent counties ===
By land

- Benzie County - north
- Grand Traverse County - northeast
- Wexford County - east
- Lake County - southeast
- Mason County - south

By water

- Manitowoc County, Wisconsin - southwest
- Kewaunee County, Wisconsin - west

=== Protected areas ===
- Manistee National Forest (part)
- Nordhouse Dunes Wilderness
- Orchard Beach State Park

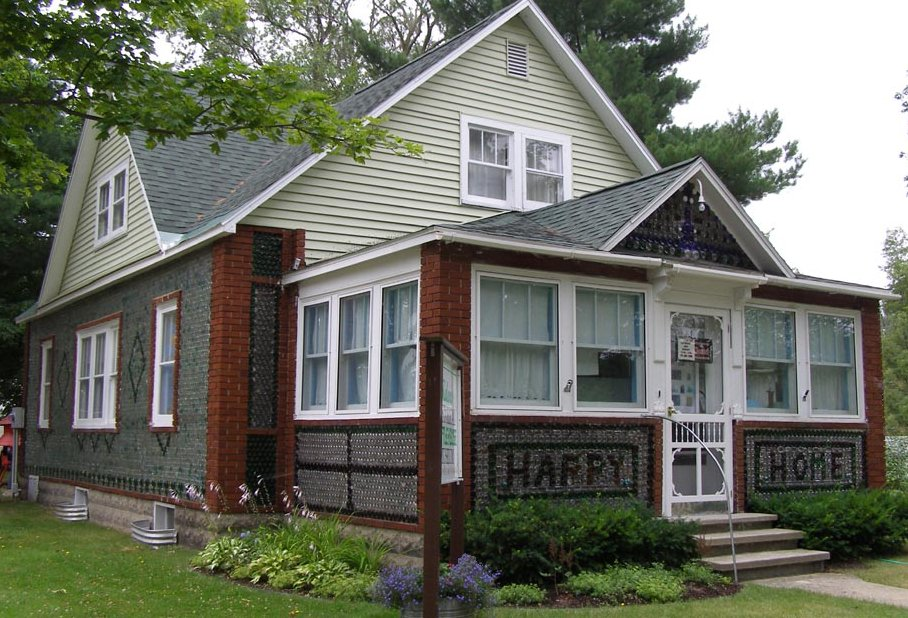
The Kaleva Bottle House

== Communities ==
=== City ===
- Manistee (county seat)

=== Villages ===
- Bear Lake
- Copemish
- Eastlake
- Kaleva
- Onekama

=== Census-designated places ===
- Arcadia
- Brethren
- Filer City
- Oak Hill
- Parkdale
- Stronach
- Wellston

=== Other unincorporated communities ===
- Dublin
- Harlan
- Marilla
- Norwalk
- Pierport
- Pleasanton
- Portage Point
- Red Park
- Wick-A-Te-Wah
- Williamsport

=== Townships ===
- Arcadia Township
- Bear Lake Township
- Brown Township
- Cleon Township
- Dickson Township
- Filer Charter Township
- Manistee Township
- Maple Grove Township
- Marilla Township
- Norman Township
- Onekama Township
- Pleasanton Township
- Springdale Township
- Stronach Township

== Demographics ==
Historical population
Census	Pop.	Note	%±
1860	975		—
1870	6,074		523.0%
1880	12,532		106.3%
1890	24,230		93.3%
1900	27,856		15.0%
1910	26,688		−4.2%
1920	20,899		−21.7%
1930	17,409		−16.7%
1940	18,450		6.0%
1950	18,524		0.4%
1960	19,042		2.8%
1970	20,094		5.5%
1980	23,019		14.6%
1990	21,265		−7.6%
2000	24,527		15.3%
2010	24,733		0.8%
2020	25,032		1.2%
2025 (est.)	25,656	▲	2.5%
U.S. Decennial Census; 1790-1960 1900-1990; 1990-2000 2010-2018

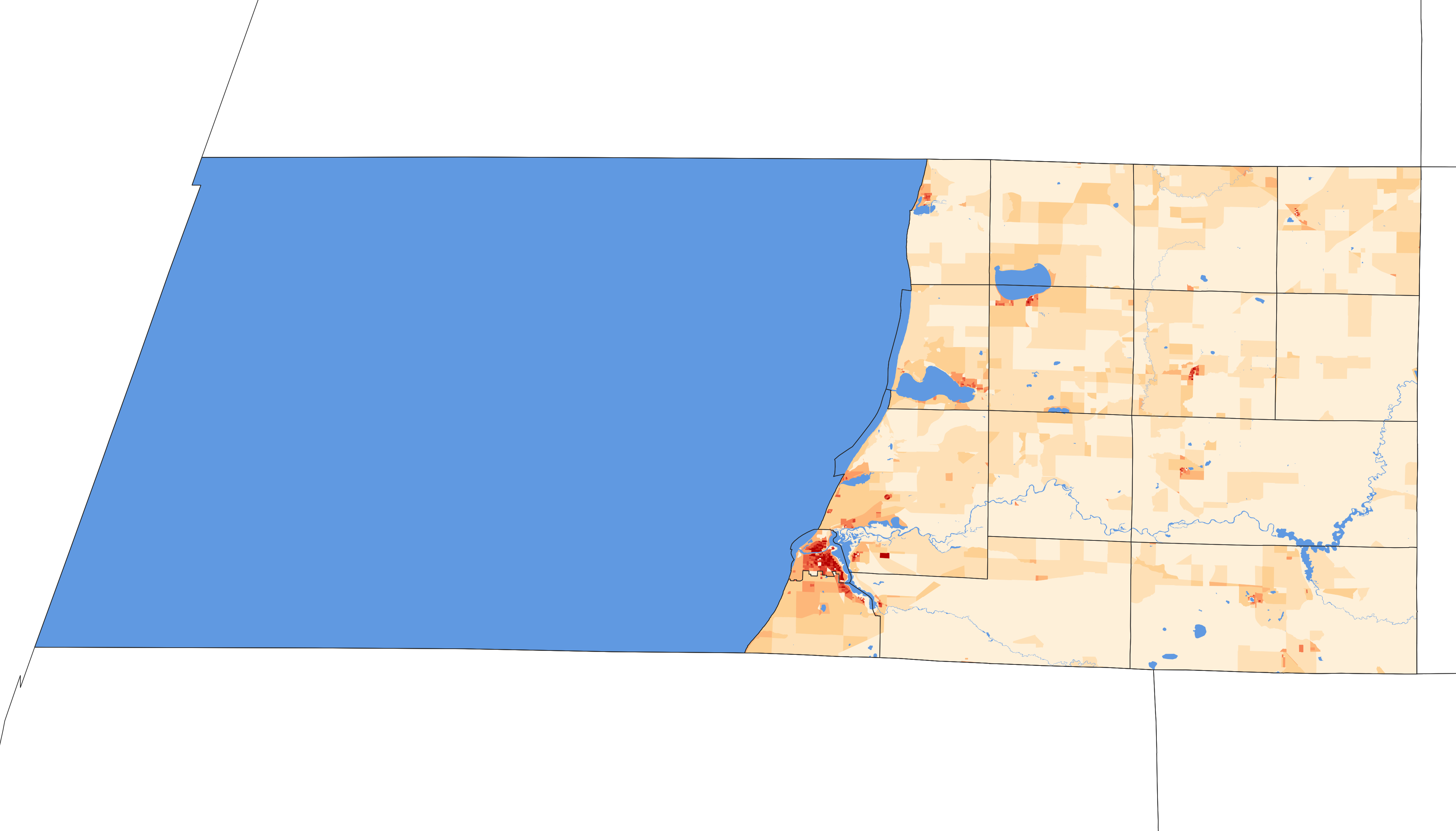
2020 population density of Manistee County MI by census block

=== Racial and ethnic composition ===
Manistee County, Michigan – Racial and ethnic composition Note: the US Census treats Hispanic/Latino as an ethnic category. This table excludes Latinos from the racial categories and assigns them to a separate category. Hispanics/Latinos may be of any race.
Race / Ethnicity (NH = Non-Hispanic)	Pop 1980	Pop 1990	Pop 2000	Pop 2010	Pop 2020	% 1980	% 1990	% 2000	% 2010	% 2020
White alone (NH)	22,402	20,647	22,781	22,402	21,836	97.32%	97.09%	92.88%	90.58%	87.23%
Black or African American alone (NH)	46	54	388	718	606	0.20%	0.25%	1.58%	2.90%	2.42%
Native American or Alaska Native alone (NH)	202	186	302	493	487	0.88%	0.87%	1.23%	1.99%	1.95%
Asian alone (NH)	51	52	77	64	79	0.22%	0.24%	0.31%	0.26%	0.32%
Native Hawaiian or Pacific Islander alone (NH)	x	x	2	14	2	x	x	0.01%	0.06%	0.01%
Other race alone (NH)	2	3	11	7	57	0.01%	0.01%	0.04%	0.03%	0.23%
Mixed race or Multiracial (NH)	x	x	327	401	1,135	x	x	1.33%	1.62%	4.53%
Hispanic or Latino (any race)	316	323	639	634	830	1.37%	1.52%	2.61%	2.56%	3.32%
Total	23,019	21,265	24,527	24,733	25,032	100.00%	100.00%	100.00%	100.00%	100.00%

=== 2020 census ===
As of the 2020 census, the county had a population of 25,032. The median age was 50.4 years. 17.1% of residents were under the age of 18 and 26.6% of residents were 65 years of age or older. For every 100 females there were 106.3 males, and for every 100 females age 18 and over there were 108.0 males age 18 and over.

The racial makeup of the county was 88.5% White, 2.5% Black or African American, 2.1% American Indian and Alaska Native, 0.3% Asian, <0.1% Native Hawaiian and Pacific Islander, 0.8% from some other race, and 5.8% from two or more races. Hispanic or Latino residents of any race comprised 3.3% of the population.

32.3% of residents lived in urban areas, while 67.7% lived in rural areas.

There were 10,597 households in the county, of which 21.3% had children under the age of 18 living in them. Of all households, 47.4% were married-couple households, 20.0% were households with a male householder and no spouse or partner present, and 24.6% were households with a female householder and no spouse or partner present. About 31.5% of all households were made up of individuals and 16.1% had someone living alone who was 65 years of age or older.

There were 15,472 housing units, of which 31.5% were vacant. Among occupied housing units, 79.6% were owner-occupied and 20.4% were renter-occupied. The homeowner vacancy rate was 2.0% and the rental vacancy rate was 10.8%.

=== 2000 census ===
As of the 2000 census, there were 24,527 people, 9,860 households, and 6,714 families residing in the county. The population density was 45 people per square mile (17 people/km^{2}). There were 14,272 housing units at an average density of 26 per square mile (10/km^{2}).

In 2000, the racial makeup of the county was 94.16% White, 1.63% Black or African American, 1.30% Native American, 0.32% Asian, 0.03% Pacific Islander, 1.01% from other races, and 1.55% from two or more races. 2.61% of the population were Hispanic or Latino of any race. 23.5% were of German, 16.9% Polish, 8.8% English, 8.8% American and 7.1% Irish ancestry. 96.2% spoke English and 2.3% Spanish as their first language.

There were 9,860 households, out of which 27.40% had children under the age of 18 living with them, 55.10% were married couples living together, 9.10% had a female householder with no husband present, and 31.90% were non-families. 27.30% of all households were made up of individuals, and 13.20% had someone living alone who was 65 years of age or older. The average household size was 2.37 and the average family size was 2.86.

In the county, the population was spread out, with 22.60% under the age of 18, 6.70% from 18 to 24, 26.30% from 25 to 44, 26.30% from 45 to 64, and 18.10% who were 65 years of age or older. The median age was 42 years. For every 100 females there were 103.40 males. For every 100 females age 18 and over, there were 102.00 males.

In 2000, the median income for a household in the county was $34,208, and the median income for a family was $41,664. Males had a median income of $33,211 versus $20,851 for females. The per capita income for the county was $17,204. About 6.90% of families and 10.30% of the population were below the poverty line, including 13.50% of those under age 18 and 7.90% of those age 65 or over.

== Education ==
School districts include:

- Bear Lake School District
- Benzie County Central School
- Kaleva Norman Dickson School District
- Manistee Area Public Schools
- Mason County Eastern District
- Mesick Consolidated Schools
- Onekama Consolidated Schools

== Government ==
The county government operates the jail, maintains rural roads, operates the major local courts, keeps files of deeds and mortgages, maintains vital records, administers public health regulations, and participates with the state in the provision of welfare and other social services. The county board of commissioners controls the budget but has only limited authority to make laws or ordinances. In Michigan, most local government functions — police and fire, building and zoning, tax assessment, street maintenance, etc. — are the responsibility of individual cities and townships.

=== Elected officials ===
- Prosecuting Attorney: Jason Haag
- Sheriff: Brian Gutowski
- County Clerk: Jill Nowak
- County Treasurer: Rachel Nelson
- Register of Deeds: Penny Pepera
- Drain Commissioner: Ken Hilliard
- County Surveyor: Patrick Bentley

(information as of February 2012)

== Politics ==
For most of the 20th century, Manistee County was a Republican stronghold in presidential elections, tending only to vote for Democrats in national landslides. One notable exception to this was in 1920, when it was the only county in Michigan to not vote for Warren G. Harding, though he only lost the county by just five votes and narrowly missed out on sweeping all of Michigan's counties. Beginning in 1992, the county saw a Democratic trend which lasted through 2012, with the exception of 2004, when incumbent Republican George W. Bush defeated Democrat John Kerry by 23 votes. In 2016 the county swung heavily Republican in support of Donald Trump, the best such performance since Reagan's 1984 landslide. In 2020 and 2024, the county continued to shift further into the Republican column.

United States presidential election results for Manistee County, Michigan
Year	Republican		Democratic		Third party(ies)	
Year	No.	%	No.	%	No.	%
1884	1,305	38.46%	1,926	56.76%	162	4.77%
1888	1,668	39.23%	2,328	54.75%	256	6.02%
1892	1,481	35.42%	2,310	55.25%	390	9.33%
1896	2,697	50.65%	2,487	46.70%	141	2.65%
1900	3,152	56.33%	2,336	41.74%	108	1.93%
1904	3,155	67.43%	1,235	26.39%	289	6.18%
1908	2,706	56.79%	1,799	37.75%	260	5.46%
1912	1,240	26.27%	1,790	37.92%	1,691	35.82%
1916	2,360	50.17%	2,177	46.28%	167	3.55%
1920	2,179	47.68%	2,184	47.79%	207	4.53%
1924	3,701	58.09%	1,314	20.62%	1,356	21.28%
1928	4,129	60.73%	2,624	38.59%	46	0.68%
1932	3,256	40.12%	4,475	55.14%	384	4.73%
1936	3,509	42.02%	4,542	54.40%	299	3.58%
1940	4,630	52.07%	4,242	47.71%	20	0.22%
1944	4,095	54.38%	3,398	45.13%	37	0.49%
1948	3,913	52.89%	3,339	45.13%	147	1.99%
1952	5,235	62.50%	3,114	37.18%	27	0.32%
1956	5,313	63.74%	3,014	36.16%	9	0.11%
1960	4,867	54.08%	4,122	45.81%	10	0.11%
1964	2,918	34.56%	5,520	65.37%	6	0.07%
1968	4,007	48.24%	3,671	44.20%	628	7.56%
1972	5,070	57.20%	3,625	40.90%	168	1.90%
1976	5,532	54.59%	4,479	44.20%	123	1.21%
1980	5,662	52.91%	4,164	38.91%	876	8.19%
1984	6,328	61.45%	3,917	38.04%	53	0.51%
1988	5,368	52.58%	4,765	46.67%	77	0.75%
1992	3,491	29.96%	5,193	44.57%	2,967	25.47%
1996	3,807	36.12%	5,383	51.08%	1,349	12.80%
2000	5,401	47.26%	5,639	49.34%	388	3.40%
2004	6,295	49.41%	6,272	49.23%	173	1.36%
2008	5,510	42.36%	7,235	55.62%	264	2.03%
2012	5,737	46.26%	6,473	52.19%	192	1.55%
2016	6,915	54.62%	4,979	39.33%	766	6.05%
2020	8,321	56.69%	6,107	41.60%	251	1.71%
2024	8,748	57.19%	6,309	41.24%	240	1.57%

United States Senate election results for Manistee County, Michigan1
Year	Republican		Democratic		Third party(ies)	
Year	No.	%	No.	%	No.	%
2024	8,491	56.14%	6,177	40.84%	457	3.02%

Michigan Gubernatorial election results for Manistee County
Year	Republican		Democratic		Third party(ies)	
Year	No.	%	No.	%	No.	%
2022	6,364	50.32%	6,026	47.65%	256	2.02%

== Fire departments and emergency medical services ==
=== County ambulance service ===
As of early 2021 North Flight EMS has since transferred the primary ambulance service to Mobile Medical Response.

=== Fire departments ===
- Arcadia Township Fire Department
- Bear Lake Township Fire Department
- City of Manistee Fire Department
- Cleon Township Fire Department
- Dickson Township Fire Department
- East Lake Township Fire Department
- Filer Township Fire Department
- Manistee Township Fire Department
- Maple Grove Township Fire Department
- Norman Township Fire Department
- Onekama Township Fire Department
- Stronach Township Fire Department

== Transportation ==
=== Airport ===
Manistee County-Blacker Airport is approximately 3 miles (4.8 km) northeast of Manistee. It offers direct flights to Chicago O'Hare International Airport.

=== Major highways ===
- US 31 runs through Manistee and Bear Lake, paralleling Lake Michigan further inland than M-22.
- M-22 begins five miles (8.0 km) north of Manistee and goes through Onekama and Arcadia, paralleling the Lake Michigan shoreline and offering a scenic route.
- M-55 begins two miles (3.2 km) north of Manistee and runs across the Lower Peninsula to Tawas City via Cadillac, Lake City, Houghton Lake, and West Branch.
- M-115 is a diagonal highway, running southeast–northwest across the northeast corner of the county. It enters Benzie County to the north and Wexford County to the east.

Previously, an additional highway, M-110, was designated to run from US 31 at Parkdale to Orchard Beach State Park. However, the highway was returned to local control in 2003.

=== Bicycle routes ===
- USBR 35 comes from Mason County and goes through Manistee, Onekama, and Arcadia to proceed north to Benzie County with M-22

== See also ==
- List of Michigan State Historic Sites in Manistee County, Michigan
- National Register of Historic Places listings in Manistee County, Michigan
