= Maple Grove Township, Manistee County, Michigan =

Maple Grove Township, Michigan
- Township
- Location within Michigan Location within the United States
- Coordinates: 44°22′34″N 86°0′22″W
- Country: United States
- State: Michigan
- County: Manistee

Area
  - Total: 35.8 sq mi (93 km^{2})
  - Land: 35.6 sq mi (92 km^{2})
  - Water: 0.2 sq mi (0.52 km^{2})
- Elevation: 748 ft (228 m)

Population (2020)
  - Total: 1,342
  - Density: 37.5/sq mi (14.5/km^{2})
- Time zone: UTC-5 (Eastern (EST))
  - Summer (DST): UTC-4 (EDT)
- ZIP Codes: 49645 (Kaleva); 49614 (Bear Lake)
- FIPS code: 26-101-51000
- GNIS feature ID: 1626675
- Website: www.maplegrovetwpmanistee.gov

Maple Grove Township is a civil township of Manistee County in the U.S. state of Michigan. The population was 1,342 at the 2020 census. The township is home to the village of Kaleva.

== Geography ==
According to the United States Census Bureau, the township has a total area of 35.8 square miles (93 km^{2}), of which 0.2 square miles (0.5 km^{2}), or 0.56%, are water. Bear Creek, a tributary of the Manistee River, crosses the west side of the township from north to south. The village of Kaleva is near the center of the township.

== Demographics ==
As of the census of 2000, there were 1,285 people, 520 households, and 348 families residing in the township. The population density was 36.0 inhabitants per square mile (13.9/km^{2}). There were 771 housing units at an average density of 21.6 per square mile (8.3/km^{2}). The racial makeup of the township was 96.58% White, 0.16% African American, 1.40% Native American, 0.93% from other races, and 0.93% from two or more races. Hispanic or Latino of any race were 3.27% of the population.

There were 520 households, out of which 28.8% had children under the age of 18 living with them, 54.0% were married couples living together, 8.8% had a female householder with no husband present, and 32.9% were non-families. 27.1% of all households were made up of individuals, and 10.6% had someone living alone who was 65 years of age or older. The average household size was 2.47 and the average family size was 2.99.

In the township the population was spread out, with 25.5% under the age of 18, 7.2% from 18 to 24, 26.1% from 25 to 44, 26.2% from 45 to 64, and 14.9% who were 65 years of age or older. The median age was 39 years. For every 100 females, there were 103.6 males. For every 100 females age 18 and over, there were 105.4 males.

The median income for a household in the township was $32,011, and the median income for a family was $37,333. Males had a median income of $27,813 versus $18,289 for females. The per capita income for the township was $14,652. About 12.1% of families and 14.8% of the population were below the poverty line, including 16.6% of those under age 18 and 11.0% of those age 65 or over.
