= Brown Township, Michigan =

- Township
- Location within Michigan Location within the United States
- Coordinates: 44°18′0″N 86°7′42″W
- Country: United States
- State: Michigan
- County: Manistee

Area
  - Total: 36.1 sq mi (93 km^{2})
  - Land: 35.6 sq mi (92 km^{2})
  - Water: 0.5 sq mi (1.3 km^{2})
- Elevation: 590 ft (180 m)

Population (2020)
  - Total: 704
  - Density: 19.8/sq mi (7.6/km^{2})
- Time zone: UTC-5 (Eastern (EST))
  - Summer (DST): UTC-4 (EDT)
- ZIP Codes: 49660 (Manistee); 49619 (Brethren); 49645 (Kaleva)
- FIPS code: 26-101-11160
- GNIS feature ID: 1625991
- Website: www.browntownshipmi.com

Brown Township is a civil township of Manistee County in the U.S. state of Michigan. As of the 2020 census, the township population was 704. It was organized in 1855.

== Communities ==
- Brown was settled in 1860. When it got a post office in 1871 it was named Up River, but the name was changed to Brown a month later. The post office closed in 1874.
- Chief was an unincorporated community that had a post office beginning in 1881. It was located to the east of Chief Lake.
- Conger had a post office from 1876 until 1889.
- Norwalk is an unincorporated community in the northwest of the township at 44°20′30″N 86°09′44″W. A post office opened with the name "Portage Creek" on October 5, 1858. The name changed to Norwalk on January 21, 1863, and operated until December 27, 1968.

== Geography ==
According to the United States Census Bureau, the township has a total area of 36.1 square miles (93 km^{2}), of which 35.6 square miles (92 km^{2}) are land and 0.5 square miles (1.3 km^{2}), 1.39%, are water. The Manistee River flows westward through the center of the township, toward Lake Michigan. Chief Lake is along the northern border but mainly in Bear Lake Township.

== Demographics ==
As of the census of 2000, there were 712 people, 277 households, and 204 families residing in the township. The population density was 20.0 inhabitants per square mile (7.7/km^{2}). There were 379 housing units at an average density of 10.6 per square mile (4.1/km^{2}). The racial makeup of the township was 97.33% White, 1.12% Native American, 0.28% Asian, 0.28% from other races, and 0.98% from two or more races. Hispanic or Latino of any race were 0.56% of the population.

There were 277 households, out of which 27.4% had children under the age of 18 living with them, 61.7% were married couples living together, 6.1% had a female householder with no husband present, and 26.0% were non-families. 22.0% of all households were made up of individuals, and 12.3% had someone living alone who was 65 years of age or older. The average household size was 2.51 and the average family size was 2.92.

In the township the population was spread out, with 23.0% under the age of 18, 6.3% from 18 to 24, 23.2% from 25 to 44, 30.2% from 45 to 64, and 17.3% who were 65 years of age or older. The median age was 43 years. For every 100 females, there were 102.8 males. For every 100 females age 18 and over, there were 97.1 males.

The median income for a household in the township was $40,380, and the median income for a family was $46,528. Males had a median income of $41,528 versus $21,012 for females. The per capita income for the township was $17,286. About 4.5% of families and 8.0% of the population were below the poverty line, including 8.3% of those under age 18 and 11.6% of those age 65 or over.
