= John J. Makinen Bottle House =

Historic house in Michigan, United States

- Kaleve Bottle House
- U.S. National Register of Historic Places
- Michigan State Historic Site
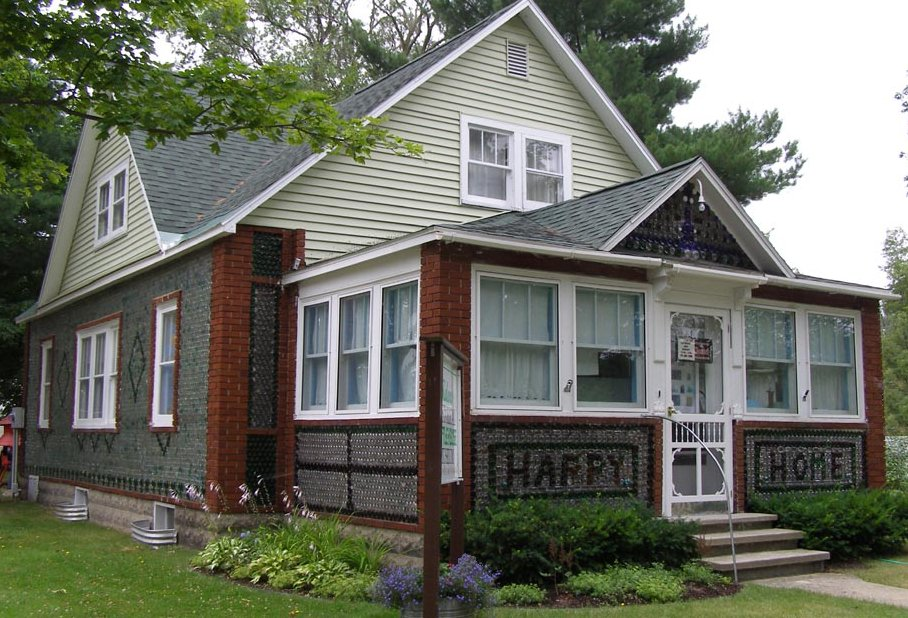
- John J. Makinen Bottle House

- Location within Michigan Location within the United States
- Interactive map
- Location: Kaleva, Michigan
- Coordinates: 44°22′19″N 86°00′35″W
- Built: 1941
- Architect: John J. Makinen Sr.
- Architectural style: Bottle house
- NRHP reference No.: 87000423
- Added to NRHP: July 7, 1987

The John J. Makinen Bottle House (also known as the Kaleva Bottle House, Kaleva Bottle House Museum, and Kaleva Historical Museum) is a house built of bottle wall construction in 1941 by John J. Makinen, Sr. It is located in Kaleva, Michigan near Manistee. Construction uses over 60,000 bottles laid on their sides with the bottoms toward the exterior.

== History ==
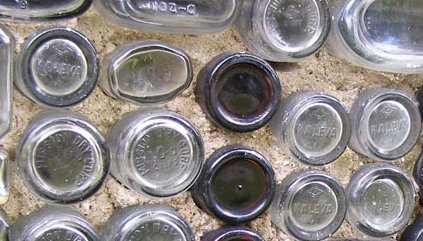
Some bottles show the Kaleva label

Makinen was a native of Finland and moved to northwestern Michigan in 1903. He owned and operated the Northwestern Bottling Works Company in Kaleva. He died just before he and his family were to move into the new bottle house.

Most of the bottles came from his bottling plant as the bottom of the bottles reveal. There is a large variety of bottles that were used for many products, including drinks, wine, beer, and liqueur. The bottles were not only round, but oblong in shape as well. The bottles are arranged with clear bottles and brown color bottles on the front of the house to spell "HAPPY HOME."

== Museum ==
The Kaleva Historical Society bought the house in 1980. The Kaleva Historical Museum then purchased it in 1981 for a museum after it was remodeled. The museum includes 19th- and 20th-century items. It also has information on the local area schools, along with local companies and families. It is listed on the National Register of Historical Sites and the Michigan Register of Historical Sites as the plaques in front of the house show.

== Corking ==
The term "pop", for carbonated soft drinks, originated in northern Michigan. The museum claims that perhaps it came from the Northwestern Bottling Works Company. It turns out in the early bottling techniques the beverage in its bottle with the cork could not withstand the pressure of the carbonation. On occasion then the cork would blow out of the bottle from the pressure and a loud "POP" sound would be produced.

== Children ==
Early in the opening of the Kaleva Bottle House Museum, the children coming through it often just wanted to see the bathroom, as the bathtub had been featured in a Nickelodeon show with a sock puppet.
