= Twelfth Night (1933 film) =

- Directed by: Orson Welles
- Written by: William Shakespeare (play); Roger Hill (abridgment); Orson Welles (voiceover)
- Produced by: Roger Hill
- Starring: Orson Welles
- Cinematography: Orson Welles
- Release date: 1933
- Country: United States
- Language: English

Twelfth Night is a 1933 American Pre-Code short color film, notable as the very earliest surviving film directed by Orson Welles, then aged 17. It is a recording of the dress rehearsal of Welles's own abridged production at his alma mater, the Todd School for Boys, where he had returned to direct this adaptation of Shakespeare's Twelfth Night for the Chicago Drama Festival in 1933. The play won first prize at that year's festival, presented as part of the 1933 Chicago World's Fair, A Century of Progress Exposition.

== Production ==
After Orson Welles's return from Europe, his friend and former headmaster Roger Hill invited him to join the Todd faculty and co-direct the Todd School's production of Twelfth Night. Using the edited version of the play that would appear in their book Everybody's Shakespeare (1934), Welles designed the costumes and conceived and created the set. The production made use of Kenneth Macgowan's concept of having the stage as a giant open book, with the turning pages being changes of scenery, painted by Welles himself.

Using a 16mm motion picture camera loaned to him by Hill, Welles increased the lighting and filmed most of a dress rehearsal in color — his very first film. Welles operated the camera himself, leaving it in a static position in the auditorium. A silent film camera was used, but Welles later recorded an accompanying narration on a gramophone disc.

Hill suggested to Welles that he film the play, wrote biographer Frank Brady, who viewed the result firsthand:

The print that I saw of Orson's Twelfth Night in Roger Hill's living room in Miami, a half-century later, was still perfectly preserved with rich color and quite professionally focused but without any camera movement, or pronounced flourishes or angles. It was simply shot from one point of view, perhaps from the middle of the tenth row of the theater: an amateur recording of the play on film rather than a piece of cinema.

The Todd School production of Twelfth Night received the silver cup from the Chicago Drama League after competition at the Century of Progress Exposition in July–August 1933. The cast included Hascy Tarbox as Sir Andrew Aguecheek and Roger Hill's daughter Joanne Hill as Viola. The play was presented at the English Village at the Chicago World's Fair.

"A short film excerpt from it is still in the Hills' possession", wrote critic Richard France. "Unfortunately, Welles's original staging was not used, only his set. A small backdrop is completely covered with a bright stylized rendering of a London street."

== Preservation status ==
In the 1930s and 1940s, rental copies of the film were distributed to schools and drama societies. The film was once believed lost, but at least one extended fragment survived in the private possession of Welles's former teacher and lifelong mentor Roger Hill, who produced the play. In March 2024, that copy was digitized by Hill's granddaughter and made available on the internet.

Although it is the earliest surviving footage filmed by Welles, it was not the first time he had used a film camera. He told a biographer that he had first done so when making a silent home movie of a visit to St. Peter's Basilica in the Vatican, at the age of nine (in 1924–1925).
