= Onekama, Michigan =

- Village
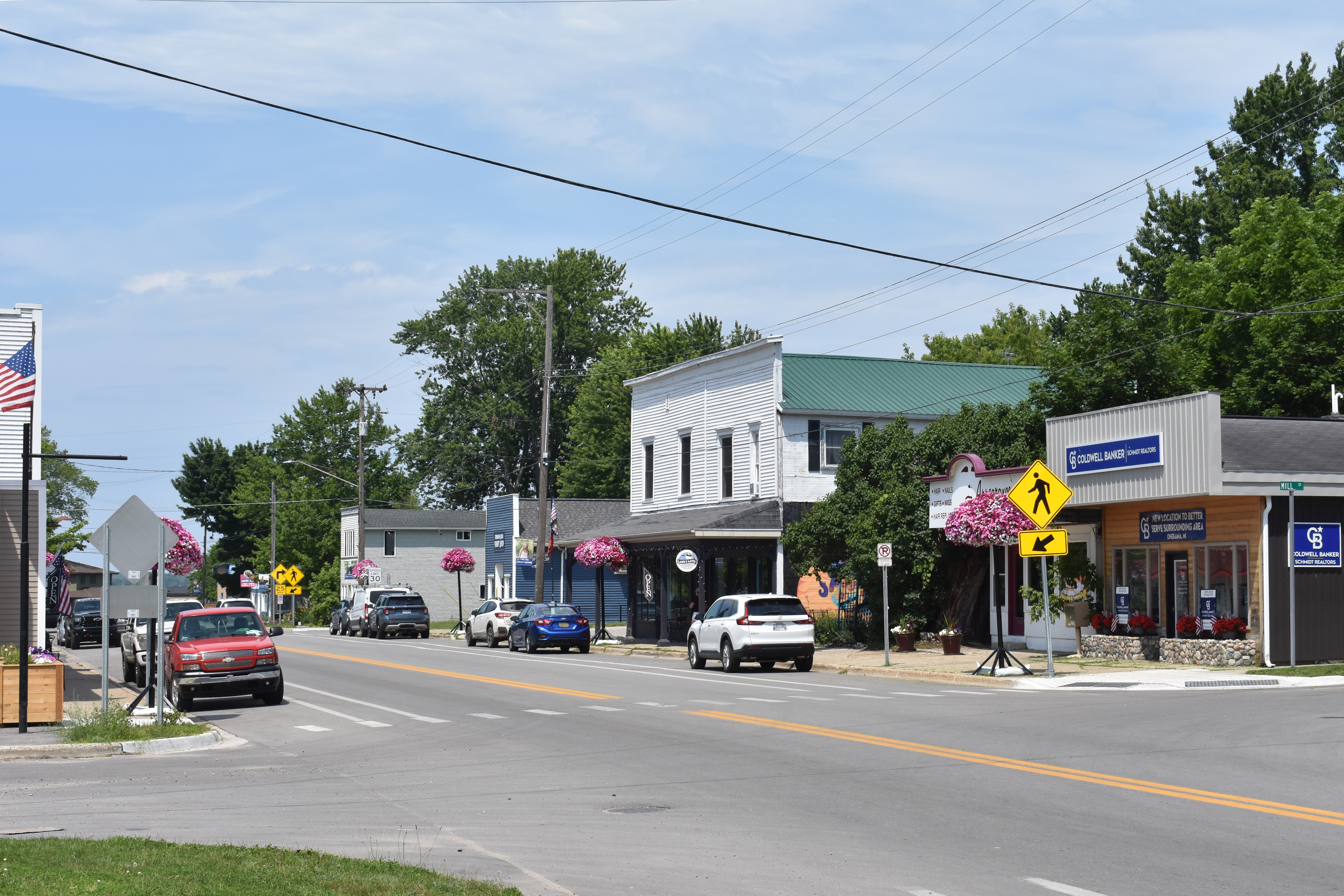
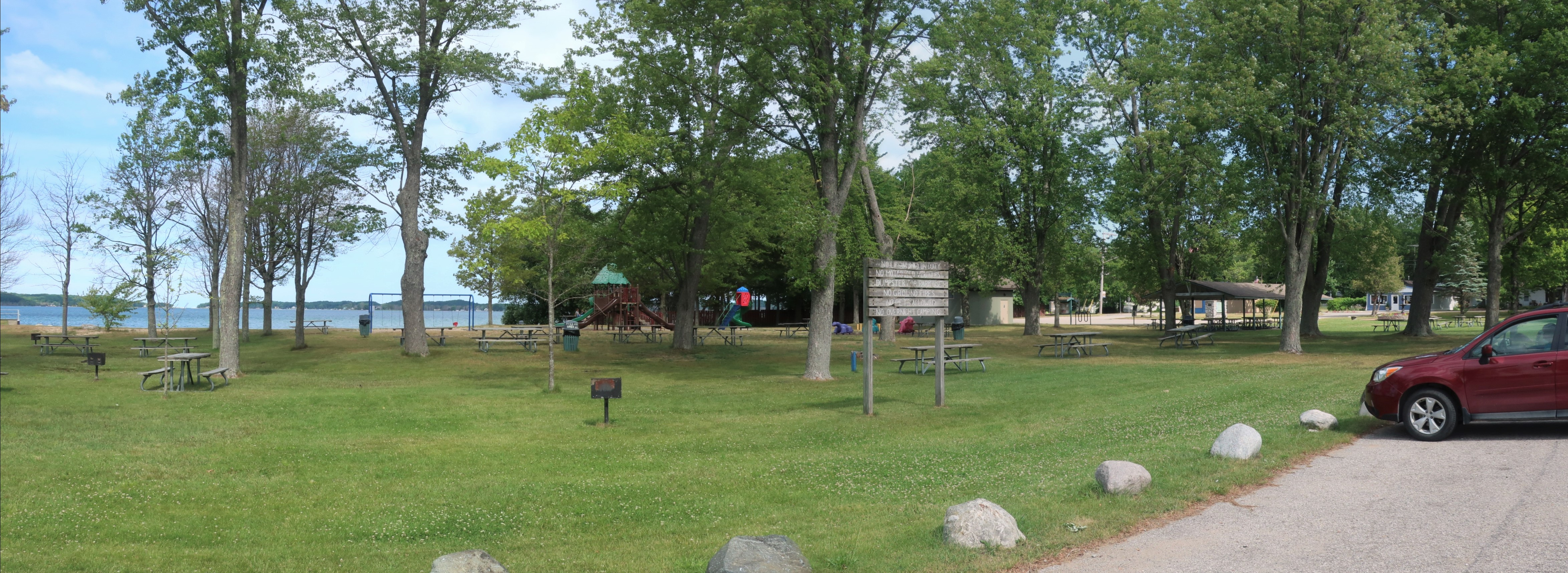
- Downtown Onekama Onekama Village Park

- Location of Onekama, Michigan
- Coordinates: 44°21′49″N 86°12′18″W
- Country: United States
- State: Michigan
- County: Manistee
- Township: Onekama

Area
  - Total: 0.59 sq mi (1.52 km^{2})
  - Land: 0.59 sq mi (1.52 km^{2})
  - Water: 0 sq mi (0.00 km^{2})
- Elevation: 607 ft (185 m)

Population (2020)
  - Total: 399
  - Density: 679.8/sq mi (262.46/km^{2})
- Time zone: UTC-5 (Eastern (EST))
  - Summer (DST): UTC-4 (EDT)
- ZIP code: 49675
- Area code: 231
- FIPS code: 26-60740
- GNIS feature ID: 1621108

Onekama (/oʊˈnɛkəmə/ oh-NEK-ə-mə) is a village in Manistee County in the U.S. state of Michigan. The population was 399 at the 2020 census. The village is located on the northeast shore of Portage Lake and is surrounded by Onekama Township. The town's name is derived from Ona-ga-maa, an Anishinaabe word which means "singing water".

== History ==
The predecessor of the village of Onekama was the settlement of Portage at Portage Point, first established in 1845, at the western end of Portage Lake, at the outlet of Portage Creek. In 1871, when landowners around the land-locked lake became exasperated with the practices of the Portage Sawmill, they took the solution into their own hands and dug a channel through the narrow isthmus, opening a waterway that lowered the lake by 12 to 14 feet (3.7 to 4.3 m) and brought it to the same level as Lake Michigan. When this action dried out Portage Creek on May 14, 1871, the settlement, which had only the week before been designated as "Onekama" with a post office under that name, moved to the previously submerged land at the northeastern shore of the lake near an earlier settlement called "Brookfield".

In 1880, the first public buildings were built in the new village. These included the Pierce gristmill and the Gibert brothers' sawmill. In 1882, the first school was built next to the present-day Congregational church. In 1883, a large summer hotel, the Glen House, was built near the Glen, with its three mineral springs that were believed to have medicinal value.

The village was incorporated in 1891 and included the earlier settlement known as Brookfield, creating a long narrow village about 1.5 miles (2.4 km) long, with the business section on the flat, former lake bottom and residences on the higher land.

In 1889, a branch of the Manistee and North-Eastern Railroad was extended to the village.

On April 27, 2024, a massive hail storm passed directly through the town causing severe damage to homes, businesses, vehicles and landscape. Most of the buildings within the town were severely damaged, having sustained broken windows, busted vinyl siding, dented steel roofs and siding, and roofs being damaged beyond repair. Much of the damage can still be seen today on many buildings. The hail ranged in size from pebbles, to some larger than golf balls.

== Geography ==
Onekama is in western Manistee County, 13 miles (21 km) northeast of Manistee, the county seat, and 10 miles (16 km) south of Arcadia. Lake Michigan is 3 miles (5 km) to the west beyond the outlet of Portage Lake.

According to the United States Census Bureau, the village of Onekama has a total area of 0.59 square miles (1.53 km^{2}), all land. The M-22 highway runs through downtown Onekama.

== Demographics ==
Historical population
Census	Pop.	Note	%±
1900	274		—
1910	324		18.2%
1920	252		−22.2%
1930	325		29.0%
1940	340		4.6%
1950	435		27.9%
1960	469		7.8%
1970	638		36.0%
1980	582		−8.8%
1990	515		−11.5%
2000	647		25.6%
2010	411		−36.5%
2020	399		−2.9%
U.S. Decennial Census

=== 2010 census ===
As of the census of 2010, there were 411 people, 205 households, and 114 families residing in the village. The population density was 708.6 inhabitants per square mile (273.6/km^{2}). There were 338 housing units at an average density of 582.8 per square mile (225.0/km^{2}). The racial makeup of the village was 96.6% White, 0.2% African American, 1.2% Native American, 0.2% Asian, and 1.7% from two or more races. Hispanic or Latino of any race were 1.9% of the population.

There were 205 households, of which 17.1% had children under the age of 18 living with them, 44.9% were married couples living together, 7.8% had a female householder with no husband present, 2.9% had a male householder with no wife present, and 44.4% were non-families. 41.0% of all households were made up of individuals, and 20.4% had someone living alone who was 65 years of age or older. The average household size was 1.98 and the average family size was 2.65.

The median age in the village was 54.4 years. 15.1% of residents were under the age of 18; 6.9% were between the ages of 18 and 24; 12.9% were from 25 to 44; 36.6% were from 45 to 64; and 28.5% were 65 years of age or older. The gender makeup of the village was 45.3% male and 54.7% female.

=== 2000 census ===
As of the census of 2000, there were 647 people, 239 households, and 152 families residing in the village. The population density was 1,083.9 inhabitants per square mile (418.5/km^{2}). There were 315 housing units at an average density of 527.7 per square mile (203.7/km^{2}). The racial makeup of the village was 85.16% White, 0.15% African American, 0.46% Native American, 13.14% from other races, and 1.08% from two or more races. Hispanic or Latino of any race were 21.79% of the population.

There were 239 households, out of which 22.2% had children under the age of 18 living with them, 49.0% were married couples living together, 12.1% had a female householder with no husband present, and 36.0% were non-families. 34.3% of all households were made up of individuals, and 17.2% had someone living alone who was 65 years of age or older. The average household size was 2.11 and the average family size was 2.66.

In the village, the population was spread out, with 24.4% under the age of 18, 8.2% from 18 to 24, 24.9% from 25 to 44, 21.9% from 45 to 64, and 20.6% who were 65 years of age or older. The median age was 39 years. For every 100 females, there were 115.0 males. For every 100 females age 18 and over, there were 103.8 males.

The median income for a household in the village was $29,091, and the median income for a family was $47,500. Males had a median income of $23,125 versus $15,455 for females. The per capita income for the village was $16,718. About 9.3% of families and 16.0% of the population were below the poverty line, including 24.5% of those under age 18 and 2.4% of those age 65 or over.

== Notable people ==
- Rev. Dr. Francis J. Hall, founder of the Chapel of St John-by-the-Lake in 1912
- Paul P. Harris, founder of Rotary International
