= Onekama Township, Michigan =

- Township
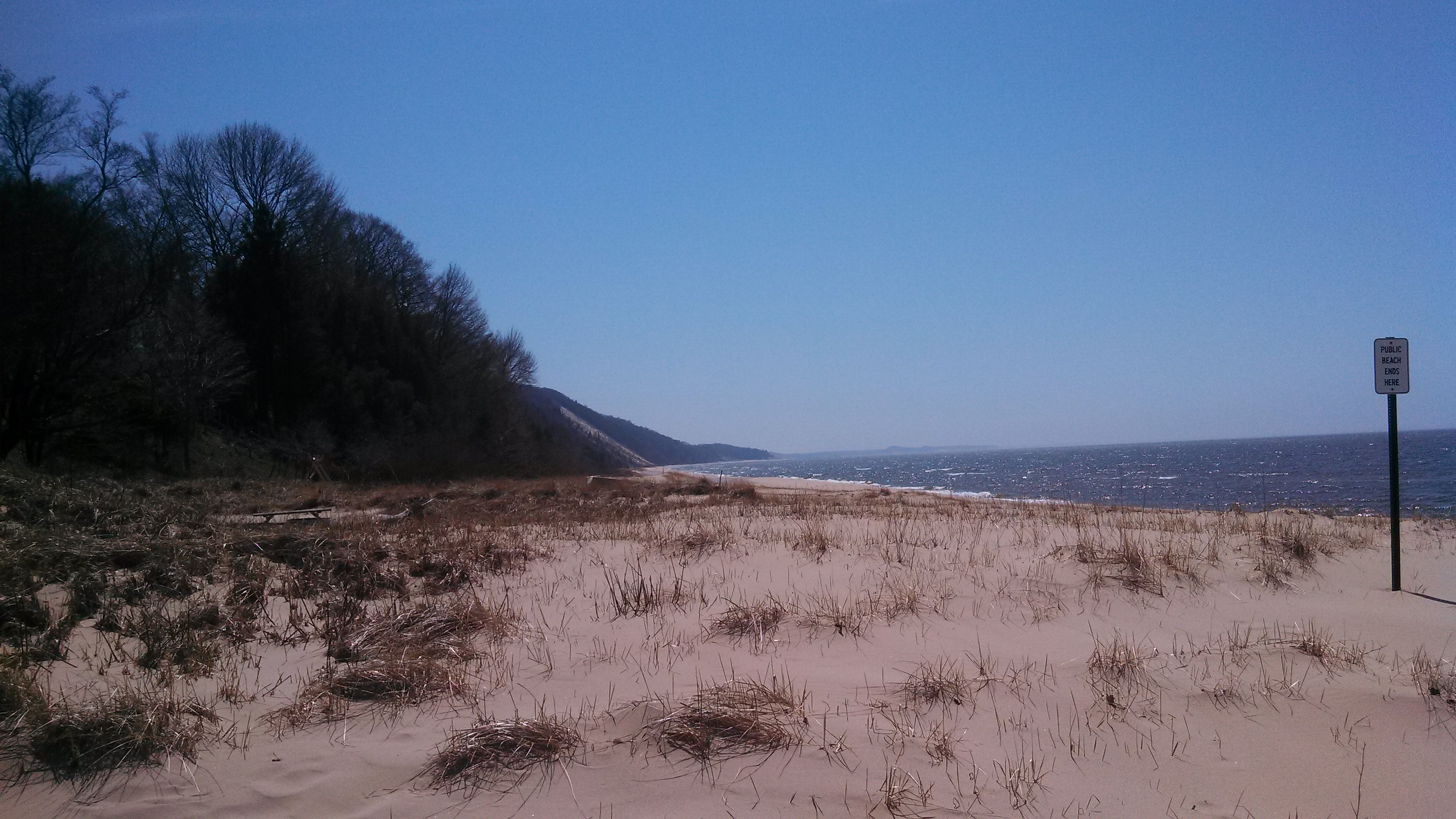

- Location within Michigan Location within the United States
- Coordinates: 44°22′7″N 86°12′36″W
- Country: United States
- State: Michigan
- County: Manistee

Area
  - Total: 23.4 sq mi (60.6 km^{2})
  - Land: 18.5 sq mi (47.8 km^{2})
  - Water: 4.9 sq mi (12.8 km^{2})
- Elevation: 712 ft (217 m)

Population (2020)
  - Total: 1,338
  - Density: 72.6/sq mi (28.0/km^{2})
- Time zone: UTC-5 (Eastern (EST))
  - Summer (DST): UTC-4 (EDT)
- ZIP codes: 49675 (Onekama); 49614 (Bear Lake); 49660 (Manistee)
- Area code: 231
- FIPS code: 26-101-60760
- GNIS feature ID: 1626848
- Website: www.onekamatwp.org

Onekama Township is a civil township of Manistee County in the U.S. state of Michigan. The population was 1,338 at the 2020 census.

== Communities ==
- The village of Onekama is located in the southeast part of the township, on the northeast side of Portage Lake. The Onekama ZIP code 49675 serves southern and central portions of the township.
- Pierport is an unincorporated community in the northwest part of the township at 44°25′36″N 86°14′24″W. In 1866, the Turnersport Pier Company built a pier here on Lake Michigan to ship wood. The place was at first known as "Turnersport" and was given a post office with that name in August 1868. Charles W. Perry from Vermont first came here in 1868. He bought the property in 1871 and developed the settlement. The settlement was renamed "Pierport", and the post office was renamed in June 1872. It was also known as "Perry's Pier". The post office operated seasonally during the summer from 1929 until closing in December 1933.
- Portage Point is an unincorporated summer resort in the southwest part of the township.
- Red Park is an unincorporated community in the township on the south shore of Portage Lake.
- Wick-A-Te-Wah is an unincorporated summer resort in the township on the south shore of Portage Lake.
- Williamsport was a historical settlement in the southwest part of the township.
- Crescent Beach is located on the southwestern shore of Portage Lake and stretches from Red Park to Williamsport.

=== Summer camps ===
In addition to the summer communities, there are a number of well-known summer camps associated with schools or church denominations. These include:

- Camp Tosebo on the south side of Portage Lake
- Little Eden on the north side of Portage Lake
- Portage Lake Covenant Bible Camp on the southeastern side of Portage Lake

== Geography ==
According to the United States Census Bureau, the township has a total area of 23.4 square miles (61 km^{2}), of which 18.4 square miles (48 km^{2}) are land and 5.0 square miles (13 km^{2}), or 21.4%, are water.

The natural spring Old Facefull is located just outside of town.

== Demographics ==
As of the census of 2000, there were 1,514 people, 603 households, and 414 families residing in the township. The population density was 82.1 inhabitants per square mile (31.7/km^{2}). There were 1,117 housing units at an average density of 60.6 per square mile (23.4/km^{2}). The racial makeup of the township was 92.80% White, 0.07% African American, 0.46% Native American, 0.07% Asian, 5.68% from other races, and 0.92% from two or more races. Hispanic or Latino of any race were 9.91% of the population.

There were 603 households, out of which 23.4% had children under the age of 18 living with them, 57.5% were married couples living together, 8.0% had a female householder with no husband present, and 31.3% were non-families. 28.4% of all households were made up of individuals, and 15.6% had someone living alone who was 65 years of age or older. The average household size was 2.22 and the average family size was 2.69.

In the township the population was spread out, with 21.7% under the age of 18, 6.0% from 18 to 24, 21.9% from 25 to 44, 26.3% from 45 to 64, and 24.2% who were 65 years of age or older. The median age was 45 years. For every 100 females, there were 101.6 males. For every 100 females age 18 and over, there were 97.3 males.

The median income for a household in the township was $39,792, and the median income for a family was $51,042. Males had a median income of $35,375 versus $19,625 for females. The per capita income for the township was $20,919. About 6.0% of families and 9.6% of the population were below the poverty line, including 15.3% of those under age 18 and 2.1% of those age 65 or over.
