= Bear (disambiguation) =

A bear is a carnivoran mammal of the family Ursidae.

Bear or Bears may also refer to:

== Places ==
- Bear (barony), County Cork, Ireland
- Bear, Arkansas, US, an unincorporated place
- Bear, Delaware, US, a census-designated place
- Bear, Idaho, US, an unincorporated place
- Bears, Friesland, Netherlands, a village
- Bear Brook (disambiguation)
- Bear Creek (disambiguation)
- Bear Island (disambiguation)
- Bear Mountain (disambiguation)
- Bear River (disambiguation)
- Bear Seamount, an underwater volcano in the Atlantic Ocean
- Bears' Cave, Romania

== Anthroponymy ==
- Bear (given name)
- Bear (surname), including a list of people with the name
- Bear (nickname), including a list of people with the nickname

== Arts, entertainment and media ==
=== Characters ===
- Bear, the main character from the TV series Bear in the Big Blue House
- Bear, a major character in The Railway Series
- Bear, a character from the .hack multimedia franchise
- Bear, from the TV series WordWorld
- Bear, in the Adventure Time animated series episode "In Your Footsteps"
- The Bear (Bo' Selecta!), a comic character created by Leigh Francis
- Br'er Bear, from the Disney picture film Song of the South
- King Bear, a recurring character in the Tara Duncan book series

=== Films ===
- Bear (2010 film), a US natural horror film
- Bear (2011 film), a black comedy short film by Nash Edgerton
- Bears (film), a 2014 Disneynature film
- The Bear (1938 film), a Soviet drama
- The Bear (1984 film), an American biopic about football coach Paul "Bear" Bryant
- The Bear (1988 film), a French adventure-drama
- The Bear (1998 film), a British animated television short
- The Bear (2012 film), an Iranian film (original release Khers)

=== Literature ===
- Bear (novel), by Marian Engel, 1976
- Bear, a graphic novel by Ben Queen, 2021
- The Bear (fairy tale)
- The Bear, a children's book by Raymond Briggs, 1994
- The Bear, a novel by Claire Cameron, 2014
- The Bear (play), by Anton Chekhov, 1888
- "The Bear", a short story by William Faulkner from Go Down, Moses, 1942
- "The Bear", a short story by Stephen King that was later incorporated into The Dark Tower III: The Waste Lands, 1991
- The Bear, a novel by Andrew Krivak, 2020

=== Music ===
- The Bear (album), by Element Eighty, 2005
- The Bears (band), an American power pop band formed in 1985
  - The Bears (album), 1987
- Symphony No. 82 (Haydn), popularly known as the Bear Symphony
- Bear McCreary (born 1979), an American composer of soundtracks for film, television and games

=== Radio stations ===
==== Canada ====
- CFBR-FM, "100.3 The Bear", Edmonton, Alberta
- CKNL-FM, "101.5 The Bear", Fort St. John, British Columbia
- CKQB-FM (identified as "106.9 The Bear" from 1994–2009 and 2011–2014), in Ottawa, Ontario
- CKRX-FM, "102.3 The Bear", Fort Nelson, British Columbia

==== United States ====
- KQBR, "99.5 The Bear" (1999–2012), Lubbock, Texas
- WBRW, "105.3 the Bear", Blacksburg, Virginia
- WBYR, "98.9 the Bear", Woodburn, Indiana
- WEKS, "The Bear 92.5", Zebulon, Georgia
- WNBB, "97.9 the Bear", Bayboro, North Carolina
- WZGM, "96.1 the Bear", Black Mountain, North Carolina

==== Elsewhere ====
- Touch FM (Stratford-upon-Avon), "The Bear 102", England

=== Television ===
- "Bear", a 1984 presidential candidate Ronald Reagan ad, known for its "bear in the woods" line
- "Bear", an episode of Servant
- The Bear (TV series), a 2022–2026 television series on FX on Hulu
  - "The Bear" (The Bear episode), a 2023 episode of The Bear
  - "Bears" (The Bear), a 2025 episode of The Bear
- "Bears", a 2004 episode of QI
- "Bears", an episode of the series Zoboomafoo

=== Other arts, entertainment and media ===
- Bear (comics), by Jamie Smart
- The Bear (opera), by William Walton
- Bear Magazine, a gay and bisexual men's periodical

== Sports teams ==
=== Collegiate ===
==== United States ====
- Central Arkansas Bears and Sugar Bears
- California Golden Bears
- Northern Colorado Bears
- Mercer Bears, Georgia
- Morgan State Bears, Maryland
- Missouri State Bears and Lady Bears
- Washington University Bears, Missouri
- NYIT Bears, New York
- Brown Bears, Rhode Island
- Baylor Bears, Texas

=== Professional ===
==== Rugby ====
- Bristol Bears, South West England, England; rugby union
- Coventry Bears, West Midlands, England; rugby league
- North Sydney Bears, New South Wales, Australia; rugby league
- Oldham Bears, Greater Manchester, England; rugby league
- Perth Bears, Western Australia, rugby league

==== Other kinds of football ====
- Brisbane Bears, Queensland, Australia; Australian rules football
- Chicago Bears, Illinois, US; American football
- Pori Bears, Satakunta, Finland; American football

==== Other sports ====
- Doosan Bears, Seoul, South Korea; baseball
- Hershey Bears, Pennsylvania, US; hockey

== Military ==
- USCGC Bear (WMEC-901), a US Coast Guard cutter
- USS Bear (1874), a US Navy ship and forerunner of modern icebreakers
- Battlefield Extraction-Assist Robot, a humanoid military robot
- Beam Experiments Aboard a Rocket, a US experimental particle-beam weapon
- Tupolev Tu-95, NATO reporting name "Bear", a Russian bomber aircraft

== Food and drink ==
- Bere (grain) or bear, a barley cultivar
- The Bear, Oxford, England
- Bear (grape), a wine grape variety
- Nestlé Bear Brand, a powdered milk and sterilized milk brand

== Computing ==
- Bear (app), note-taking software
- BEAR and LION ciphers, in cryptography
- Microsoft Bear, the mascot of the Windows 3.1 development team

== Other uses ==
- Bear (St. Paul's Churchyard), a historical bookseller in London
- Bear Inn, Cowbridge, Wales
- Lycia ursaria, common name "Bear", a species of moth
- Ursa Major and Ursa Minor, constellations, common name "the Bears"
- Bear (Boy Scouts of America), an achievement level
- Bear (gay culture), an LGBTQ subculture and slang term
- Bear market, in economics
- Pedobear, an Internet meme
- Russian Bear, a symbol of Russia

== See also ==
- Bär (disambiguation)
- Baer (disambiguation)
- Bare (disambiguation)
- Behr (disambiguation)
- Big Bear (disambiguation)
- Bruin (disambiguation)
- Little Bear (disambiguation)
- Water bear or tardigrade, a microanimal
