= Bear (surname) =

Origin
- Language: English
- Meaning: bear

Bear is a surname. Notable people with the name include:

- Big Bear (American football) (1889–1959), Native American NFL player
- Carter Bear (born 2006), Canadian ice hockey player
- Elizabeth Bear, pen name of American author Sarah Bear Elizabeth Wishnevsky (born 1971)
- Ethan Bear (born 1997), Canadian ice hockey player
- Glecia Bear (1912–1998), Canadian Cree writer
- Greg Bear (1951–2022), American author
- Jack Bear (1920–2007), American costume designer
- Joseph Ainslie Bear (1878–1955), American banker
- Laura Bear (born 1965), British anthropologist and academic
- Liza Béar, American filmmaker
- Michael Bear (1934–2000), English cricketer

== See also ==
- Barbara Bears (born 1971), American ballet dancer
- Bear (nickname)
- Bear (disambiguation)
- Ber (name)
- List of fictional bears, including some where Bear is used as a surname
