= Bear Island =

Bear Island primarily refers to

- Bjørnøya, an island between mainland Norway and Svalbard

Bear Island may also refer to:

== Canada ==
- Bear Island (New Brunswick), New Brunswick
- Bear Island, Newfoundland and Labrador, or Deer Island, an abandoned community in Newfoundland and Labrador, Canada
- Bear Island, Smith's Cove, Nova Scotia
- Bear Island (Lake Temagami), Ontario

=== Nunavut ===
- Bear Island (Nunavut), Labrador Sea, Nunavut
- Bear Islands, Hudson Bay, Nunavut

== Denmark ==
- Bjorne Island
- Bjorne Islands
- Nanortalik Island (Kalaallisut: "Polar Bear Place"), sometimes translated as Bear Island, a town on Nanortalik Island, southern

== Norway ==
- Bjørnøya, Ålesund, an island in Møre og Romsdal county, Norway
- Various other islands called Bjørnøya, see Bjørnøya (disambiguation)

== United States ==
- Bear Island (Connecticut), one of the Thimble Islands, Connecticut
- Bear Island (Maine), in Northeast Harbor, Maine
- Bear Island (Maryland), between the Potomac River and C&O Canal near Great Falls, Montgomery County, Maryland
- Bear Island (Minnesota), an island in Bear Island Lake, south of Ely, Minnesota
- Bear Island (Lake Winnipesaukee), New Hampshire
- Bear Island (New York), an island in the Hudson River, also known as Beeren Island, New York
- Bear Island (North Carolina), an island that makes up most of Hammocks Beach State Park, North Carolina
- Bear Island (South Carolina), one of the Sea Islands in Charleston County, South Carolina, South Carolina
- Bear Island (Wisconsin), one of the Apostle Islands in Lake Superior, Wisconsin

=== Massachusetts ===
- Bear Island (Norfolk County, Massachusetts)
- Bear Island (Plymouth County, Massachusetts)

== Russia ==
- Medvezhy Island or Bear Island, in the Sea of Okhotsk
- Medvezhyi Islands or Bear Islands, in the East Siberian Sea

== Other places ==
- Bear Island (Antarctica)
- Bear Island (Amur River), China and Russia
- Bears Island (Tasmania), Australia
- Bere Island (or Bear Island), an island in Cork County, Ireland

== Arts and entertainment ==
- Bear Island (novel), a novel by Alistair MacLean
  - Bear Island (film), adapted from the novel by Alistair MacLean

== See also ==
- Bair Island
- Bjørnøya (disambiguation)
- Bear (disambiguation)
