= Nyssia =

Nyssia may refer to:

- a synonym for the Lycia (moth)
- Nyssia, the wife of Candaules, a king of the ancient Kingdom of Lydia
