= Bear (given name) =

Bear is an English given name and nickname, and is derived from the animal of the same name. It has been among the 1,000 most popular names for boys in the United Kingdom since 2015, and in the United States since 2018.

- Bear Alexander (born 2003), American football player
- Bear Bachmeier, American football player
- Bear Bronson (born 1995), American professional wrestler
- Bear Davis, American lacrosse coach
- Bear F. Braumoeller (1968–2023), American academic
- Bear Bryant (1913 – 1983), American college football player and coach
- Bear Grillz, American DJ and producer
- Bear Grylls (born 1974), British adventurer
- Bear Hunter (died 1863), Shoshone chief
- Bear McCreary (born 1979), American composer
- Bear Pascoe (born 1986), American football player
- Bear Rinehart (born 1980), American singer-songwriter
- Bear Woods (born 1987), American gridiron football player

== See also ==
- Bear (disambiguation)
- Bear (nickname)
- Bear (surname)
