= Behr (disambiguation) =

Behr is a surname of German origin.

Behr may also refer to:

- Behr (paint), an American paint manufacturer
- Behr Brothers & Co. (1880–1910), a piano manufacturing company
- Behr GmbH & Co. KG, a German automobile parts manufacturer
- Behr Glacier, Victoria Land, Antarctica
- Behr syndrome, a genetic disorder causing early-onset optic atrophy

== See also ==
- Bear (disambiguation)
