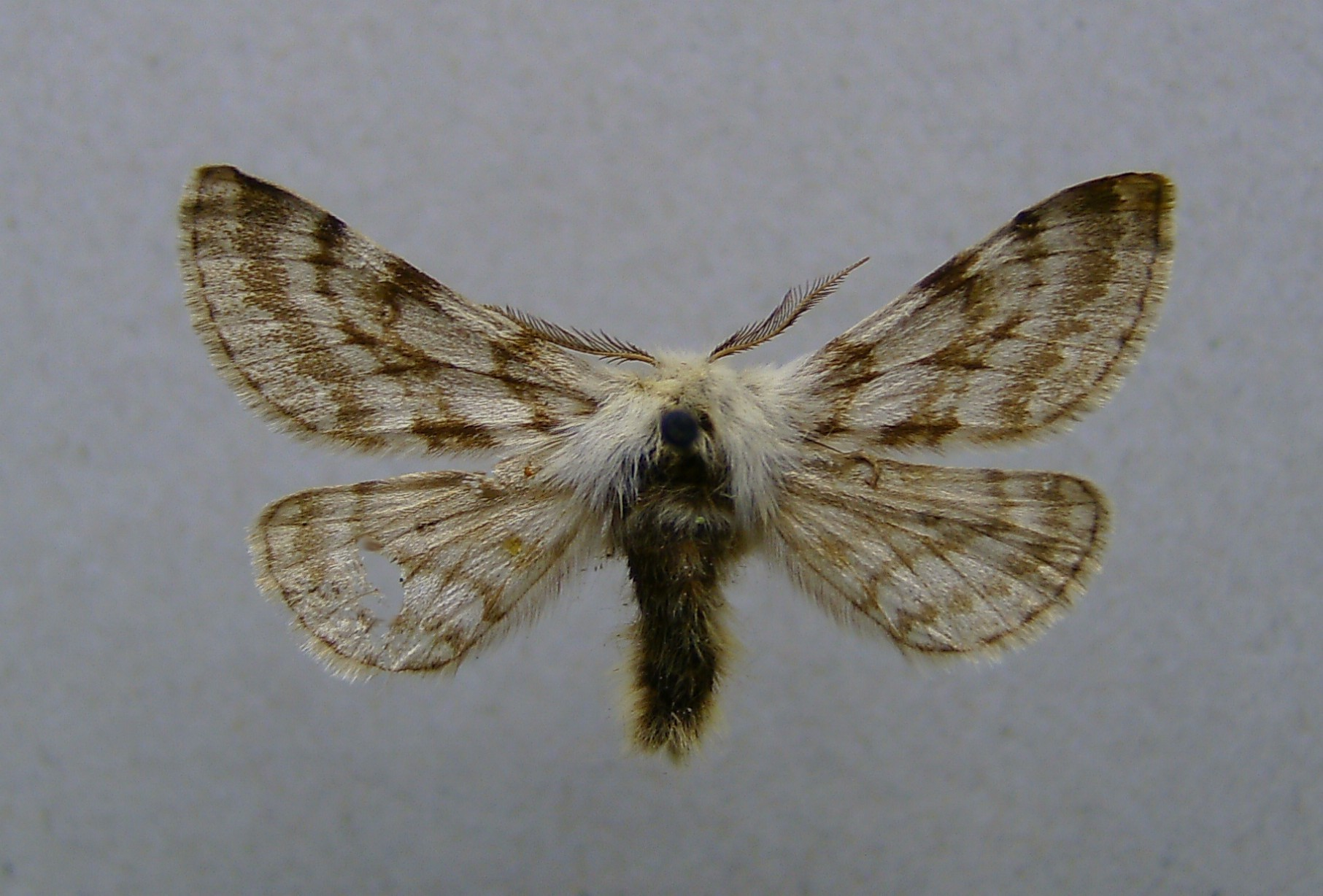
- Male

Scientific classification
- Domain: Eukaryota
- Kingdom: Animalia
- Phylum: Arthropoda
- Class: Insecta
- Order: Lepidoptera
- Family: Geometridae
- Genus: Lycia
- Species: L. alpina

Binomial name
- Lycia alpina (Sulzer, 1776)

Synonyms
- Phalaena alpina Sulzer, 1776

= Lycia alpina =

Species of moth

Lycia alpina is a moth of the family Geometridae. It is found in the Alps on altitudes between 1,000 and 2,500 meters and in the Jura Mountains.

The wingspan is 28–40 mm for males. Females are wingless. Adults are on wing from April to July in one generation per year.

The larvae feed on various low-growing plants, Leucanthemum, Rosa, Salix, Scabiosa and Sisymbrium species. It overwinters as a pupa.

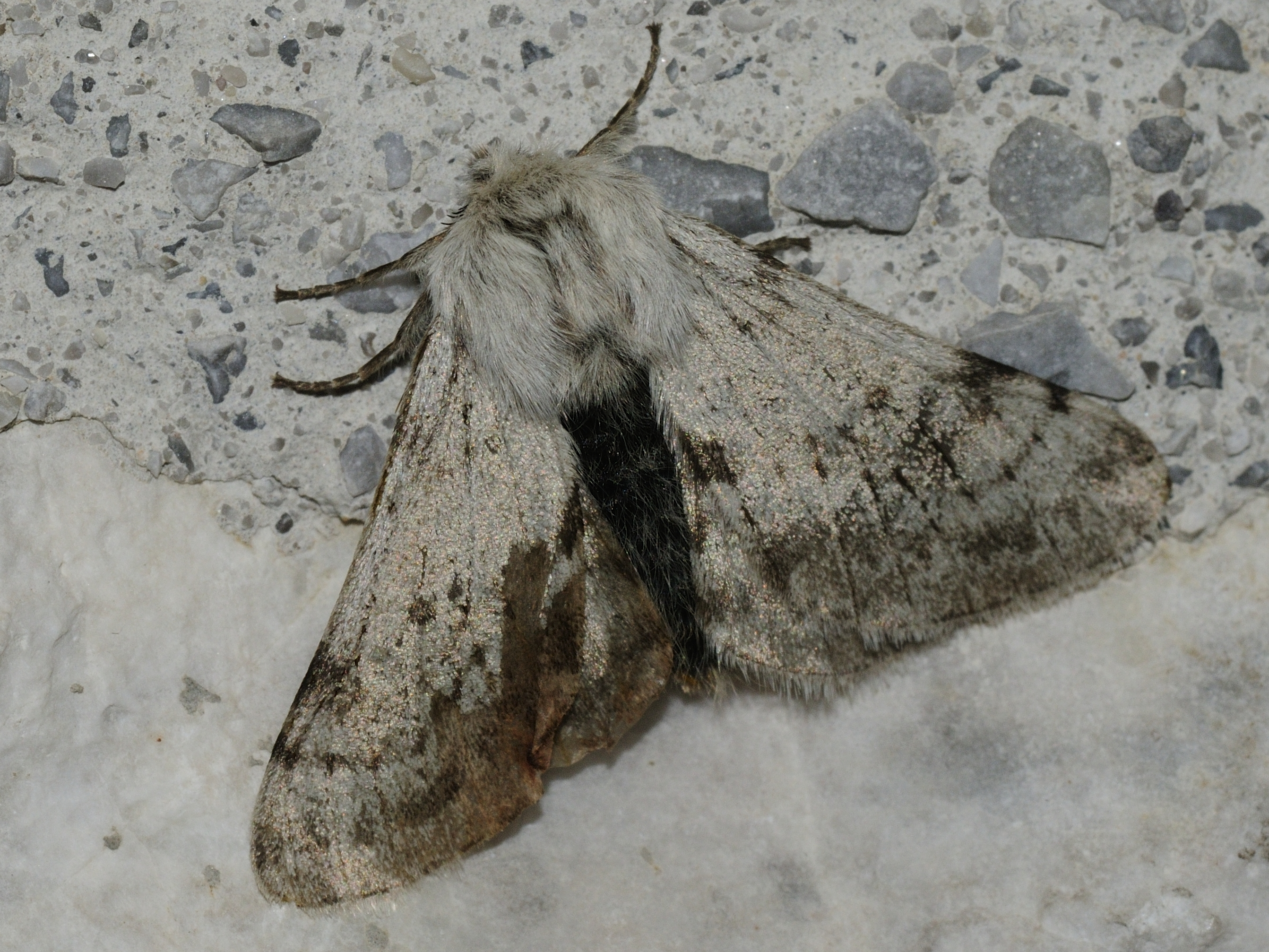
Top view

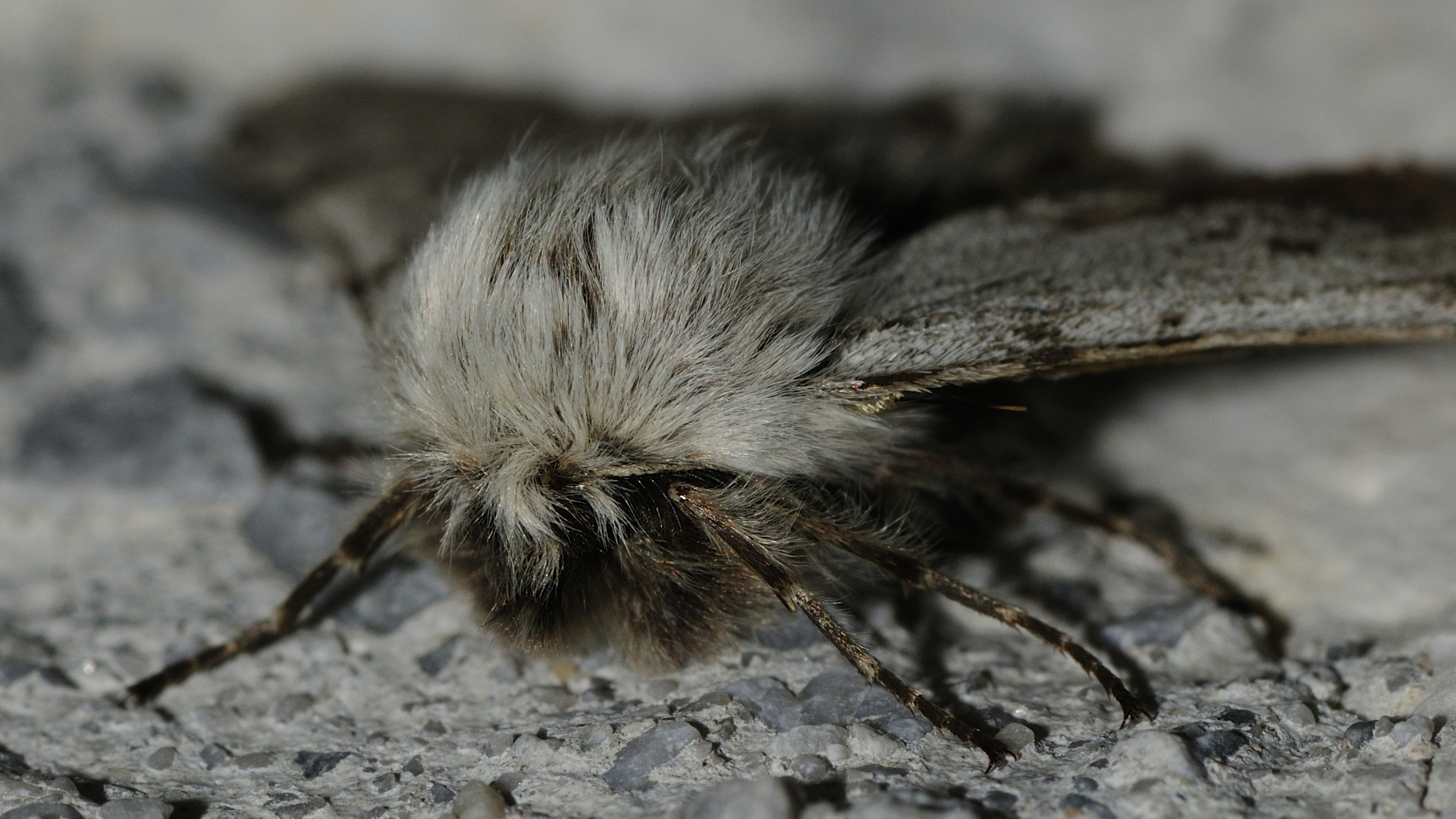
Face

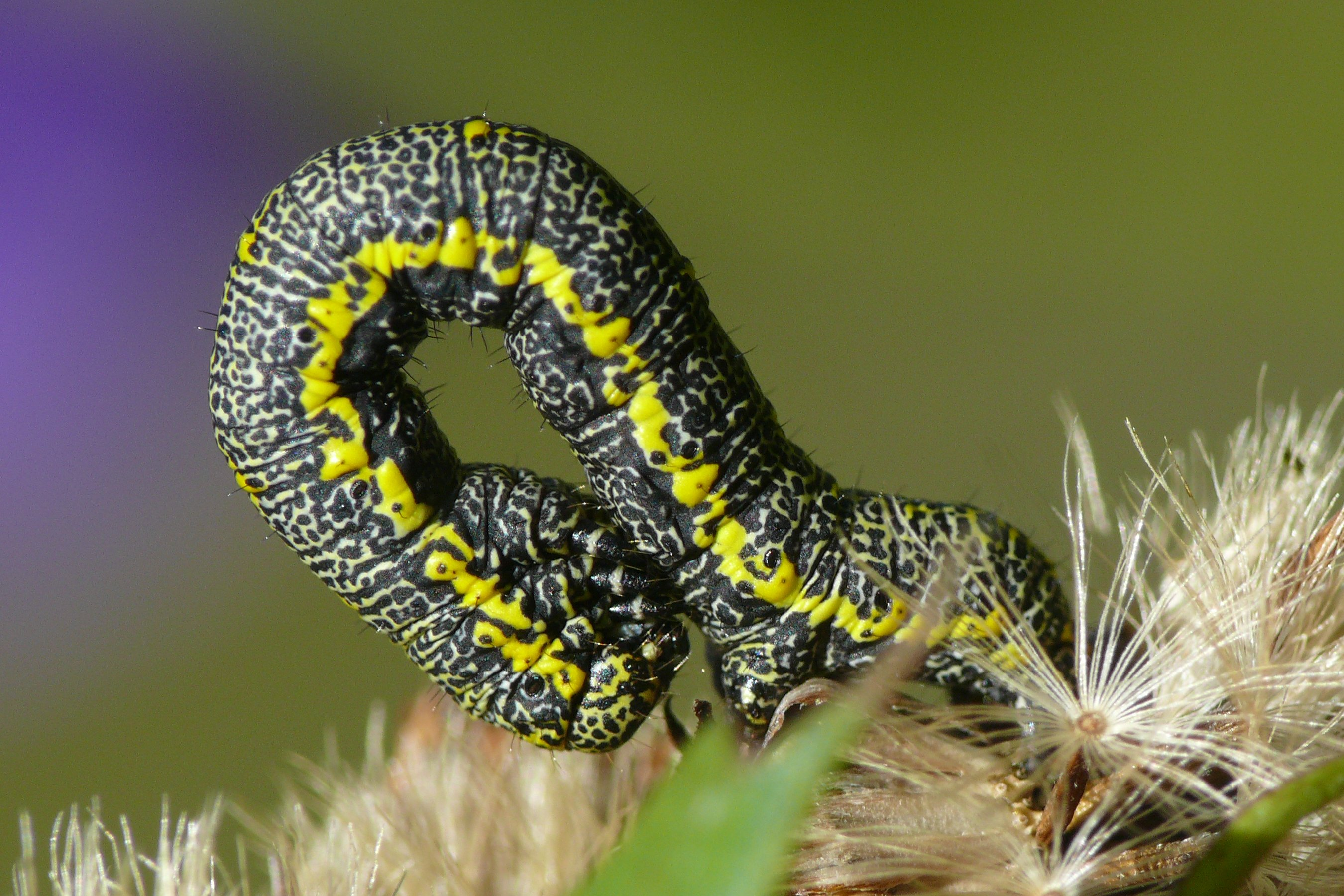
Caterpillar
