= Great Bear =

The term Great Bear can refer to:

- Ursa Major, the constellation, whose name is the Latin for "Great Bear"
- Great Bear Lake, the largest lake in the Northwest Territories of Canada and the fourth largest in North America
- Great Bear River, a river fed by Great Bear Lake in the Northwest Territories of Canada
- Great Bear Rainforest, British Columbia
- Great Bear Recreation Park, a ski hill in Sioux Falls, South Dakota
- Great Bear Wilderness area in Montana
- Great Bear (band), a contra dance band
- Great Bear (Radium line) a tugboat built and operated by the Radium line
- Great Bear (roller coaster), an inverted steel roller coaster at Hersheypark in Hershey, Pennsylvania
- The Great Bear (film), a 2011 Danish film
- The Great Bear (lithograph), artwork by Simon Patterson based on the London Tube map
- The Great Bear (novel), 2021 novel by David A. Robertson
- The Great Bear (play), a 1951 play, never produced, by John Osborne
- GWR 111 The Great Bear, a British steam locomotive

== See also ==
- Great (disambiguation)
- Bear (disambiguation)
