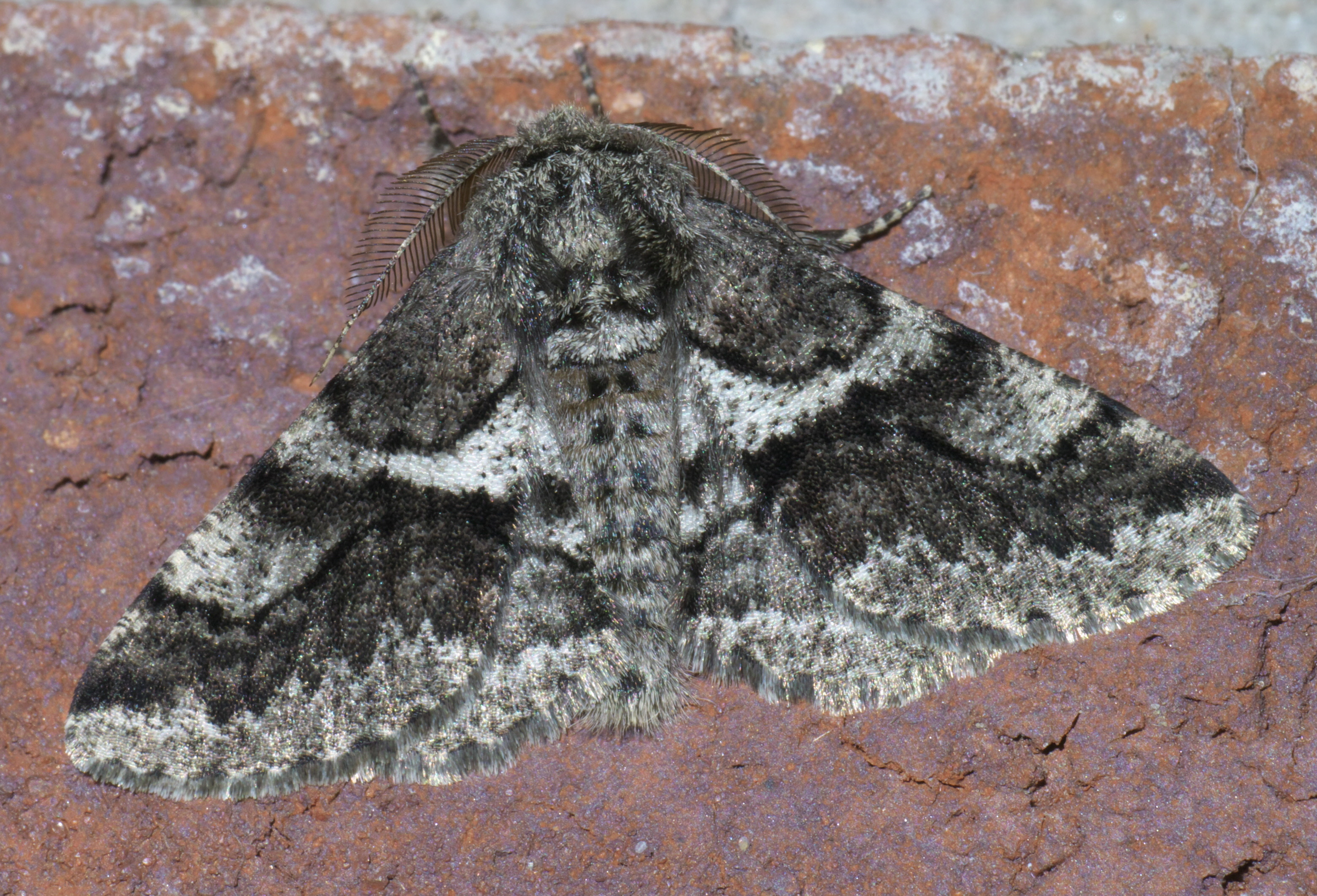

Scientific classification
- Kingdom: Animalia
- Phylum: Arthropoda
- Class: Insecta
- Order: Lepidoptera
- Family: Geometridae
- Tribe: Bistonini
- Genus: Lycia
- Species: L. ypsilon

Binomial name
- Lycia ypsilon (S. A. Forbes, 1885)

= Lycia ypsilon =

Species of moth

Lycia ypsilon, the woolly gray, is a species of geometrid moth in the family Geometridae. It is found in North America.

The MONA or Hodges number for Lycia ypsilon is 6652.

== Subspecies ==
These two subspecies belong to the species Lycia ypsilon:

- Lycia ypsilon carlotta Hulst, 1896
- Lycia ypsilon ypsilon
