= Bruin =

Bruin, (from Dutch for "brown"), is an English folk term for brown bear.

Bruin, Bruins or BRUIN may also refer to:

== Places ==
- Lake Bruin, ox-bow lake of the Mississippi River located in northeastern Louisiana
  - Lake Bruin State Park
- Bruin, Kentucky, United States
- Bruin, Pennsylvania, United States
- Bruin's Slave Jail, building in Alexandria, Virginia

== Sports team nicknames and mascots ==
- Ayr Bruins, a defunct Scottish ice hockey team
- Bellevue University, Bellevue, Nebraska
- Belmont University, Nashville, Tennessee
- Bob Jones University, Greenville, South Carolina
- Boston Bruins, an American NHL hockey team
- UCLA Bruins, a collegiate sports team located in Los Angeles, California
- Chilliwack Bruins, a former Canadian major junior ice hockey team in Chilliwack, British Columbia
- George Fox University, Newberg, Oregon
- Kellogg Community College, Battle Creek, Michigan
- New Westminster Bruins, a former Canadian major junior ice hockey team in New Westminster, British Columbia
- Piedmont International University, Winston-Salem, North Carolina
- Providence Bruins, an American AHL hockey team in Providence, Rhode Island
- Salt Lake Community College, Salt Lake County, Utah
- Sheridan College, Brampton, Ontario

== Other uses ==
- Bruin (surname)
- Oud bruin, Belgian beer
- Heineken Oud Bruin, Dutch beer
- Yamaha Bruin 350, utility all-terrain vehicle
- Brown University Interactive Language, a programming language
- Rasmus Klump, a comic strip published as Bruin
- Bruin, a brown bear in the Reynard cycle fables

== See also ==
- List of Bruin mascots
- Ursidae
