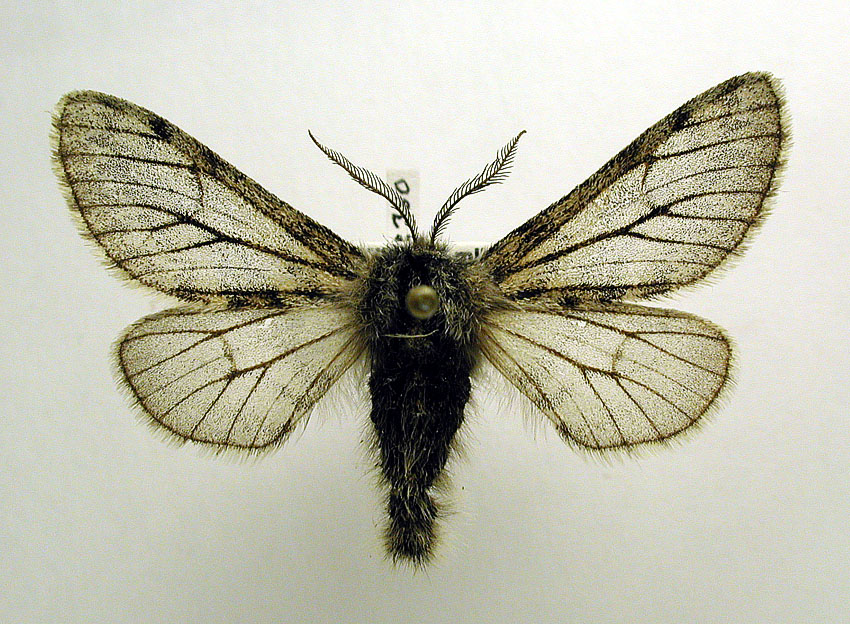

Scientific classification
- Domain: Eukaryota
- Kingdom: Animalia
- Phylum: Arthropoda
- Class: Insecta
- Order: Lepidoptera
- Family: Geometridae
- Genus: Lycia
- Species: L. pomonaria

Binomial name
- Lycia pomonaria (Hübner, 1790)

= Lycia pomonaria =

Species of moth

Lycia pomonaria is a moth of the family Geometridae. It is found from central and northern Europe through Siberia to the Kamchatka Peninsula.

The wingspan is 30–35 mm for males. Females are wingless. Adult males are on wing from April to June. There is one generation per year.

The larvae mainly feed on Betula, but also feed on other deciduous trees and Vaccinium species.
