= Princess Monster Wife =

- Adventure Time episode
- Episode no.: Season 4 Episode 9
- Directed by: Larry Leichliter (Note: Director); Adam Muto (Note: Creative director); Nick Jennings (Note: Art director)
- Written by: Somvilay Xayaphone; Bert Youn
- Story by: Patrick McHale; Kent Osborne; Pendleton Ward
- Production code: 1008-088
- Original air date: May 28, 2012
- Running time: 11 minutes

Episode chronology
← Previous "Hug Wolf"	Next → "Goliad"
- Adventure Time season 4

"Princess Monster Wife" is the ninth episode of the fourth season of the American animated television series Adventure Time. The episode was written and storyboarded by Somvilay Xayaphone and Bert Youn, from a story by Patrick McHale, Kent Osborne, and Pendleton Ward. It originally aired on Cartoon Network on May 28, 2012.

The series follows the adventures of Finn (voiced by Jeremy Shada), a human boy, and his best friend and adoptive brother Jake (voiced by John DiMaggio), a dog with magical powers to change shape and grow and shrink at will. In this episode, Finn and Jake discover that the Ice King (voiced by Tom Kenny) has been stealing princesses' body parts to build a bride, Princess Monster Wife. She is so horribly deformed that Finn and Jake cannot view her directly without fainting; eventually, Princess Monster Wife realizes that she is a monster and returns the stolen body parts.

Ward explained that "Princess Monster Wife" was conceptualized to be both a sad and funny story at the same time. The episode featured a song, "Something Special", written by McHale, that was inspired by the 1992 song "A Whole New World", from the animated feature film Aladdin. According to a report by Nielsen, the episode ranked as the number one telecast among all boy demographic groups, and it also received mostly positive critical reviews; Oliver Sava of The A.V. Club and Dean Childers of TV Geek Army both appreciated the focus on the Ice King. However, Justin Remer of DVD Talk disliked the episode because he felt its story did not translate well onto the screen.

== Plot ==
The princesses of Ooo all wake up to find various parts of their bodies missing. They go to Finn and Jake, who promise to help them. Suspecting that the culprit is Ice King (voiced by Tom Kenny), they confront him. At first, he denies the allegations; he then shows them his new bride, Princess Monster Wife (voiced in tendem by Hynden Walch, Pendleton Ward, and Steve Little), a being made up of the stolen body parts. Horrified, Finn and Jake faint. Princess Monster Wife inquires as to who the two are, and the Ice King lies, saying that they are their children. Ice King, Princess Monster Wife, and an unconscious Finn and Jake all have dinner. Afterwards, Princess Monster Wife confesses to Ice King that she feels different, to which the Ice King responds by singing "Something Special"; he argues that she is all he needs.

After Finn and Jake regain consciousness only to faint due to Princess Monster Wife's hideousness, she begins to doubt her normality, leading the Ice King to throw a fashion show. All of the kingdom's penguins are in attendance, but one of them vomits due to Princess Monster Wife's ugliness. Distraught, Princess Monster Wife locks herself in her room. The Ice King desperately tries to show her that she is beautiful by revealing that he made her out of the parts of the princesses he found most attractive. Princess Monster Wife is disturbed by this notion and eventually decides to return the stolen body parts, until she herself does not exist. However, the Ice King is not moved, and angrily bemoans that she "gave away all [his] stuff."

== Production ==
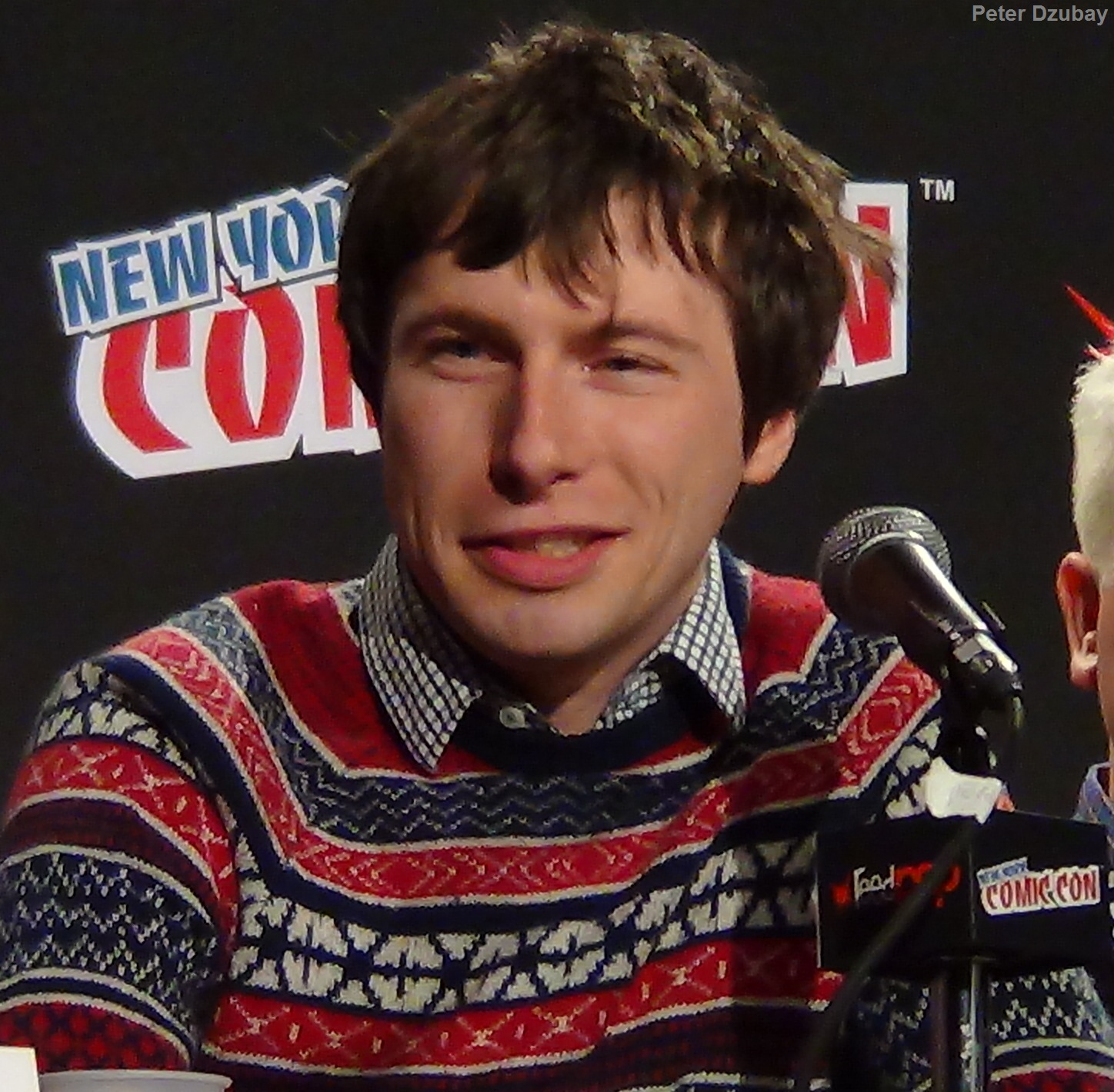
The episode's song, "Something Special", was written by Patrick McHale.

The story for "Princess Monster Wife" was developed by Patrick McHale, Kent Osborne, and series creator Pendleton Ward. In the DVD commentary for the episode, Ward revealed that with "Princess Monster Wife" he was hoping to craft a story that was both "super sad and intense, [but] tickles your funny bone at the same time." Ward further explained that the eponymous character was analogous to himself, noting, "I'm made out of broken parts … but you can turn [those parts] into something worth displaying." To voice Princess Monster Wife, Ward, Walch, and Little had to record each of their lines in tandem, mimicking the tones of one another.

The storyboard for "Princess Monster Wife" was created by Somvilay Xayaphone and Bert Youn, and the episode was directed by Larry Leichliter. According to Ward, Youn's storyboarding idiosyncrasies are especially noticeable in this episode; several times, he drew Finn with gums, something that most storyboard artists do not do. During the episode's DVD commentary, fellow storyboard artist Jesse Moynihan argued that Youn employed "visual vocabulary [borrowed] from anime", which informed how he drew the characters.

The song that the Ice King sings to Princess Monster Wife is called "Something Special". According to McHale, the song's writer, the main inspiration for it was the 1992 song "A Whole New World", from the animated feature film Aladdin. McHale recorded a demo track of the song, featuring himself accompanied on guitar; during the recording of this demo, however, his cat kept meowing loudly. The crew found this funny, and so, in the finished episode, Gunter the penguin's cat offspring can be heard meowing several times. McHale later released his demo for "Something Special" via Twitter on June 15, 2012. Originally, it was planned for Princess Monster Wife to join in with the Ice King and sing the song as a duet. Hynden Walch actually recorded her part, and the production staff intended for Ward and Little to record their lines as well. However, in the end, the crew decided it was funnier for the Ice King to sing both parts.

== Reception ==
"Princess Monster Wife" first aired on Cartoon Network on May 28, 2012. The episode ranked as the number one telecast among all boy demographic groups (e.g. boys aged 2–11, 6-11, and 9-14), according to a report by Nielsen. The episode first saw physical release as part of the 2014 DVD, Princess Day, which included 16 episodes from the series' second through sixth seasons. It was later re-released as part of the complete fourth season DVD in October 2014.

Oliver Sava of The A.V. Club awarded the episode a "B+", calling it "one of those twisted Adventure Time stories that doesn’t give the viewer any time to catch up with all the weirdness that is happening on screen, and the general effect afterward is one of satisfied disorientation." Sava applauded the fact that the episode delves into "the demented relationship that develops between Ice King and his new wife", noting that while "the writers could have easily depicted Ice King in a more unsympathetic light, ... the tragedy of the episode is that Ice King genuinely cares about his new wife." He was also complimentary towards the song, describing it as a "suitably bizarre Adventure Time version of 'A Whole New World'".

Dean Childers of TV Geek Army applauded the episode, noting that the episode shows off the Ice King’s “best traits when trying to help monster princess”, and that “you see the fruits of their bond near the end of the episode.” Childers was also complimentary towards Ice King’s “Something Special” song, writing that it was “sweet in a disturbing, Frankenstein-dating-his-creature kinda [sic] way.” He felt that the ending was “cliché [but] also undeniably charming”, and that the episode overall “proves that even the most disturbing of foes can have their moments.”

Justin Remer of DVD Talk, on the other hand, felt that the episode was a "misfire", and he argued that it was the weakest episode included on the Princess Day DVD. He wrote, "Conceptually, 'Princess Monster Wife' isn't bad, but realized on screen, its gruesome execution is too unnerving to be funny or effective."
