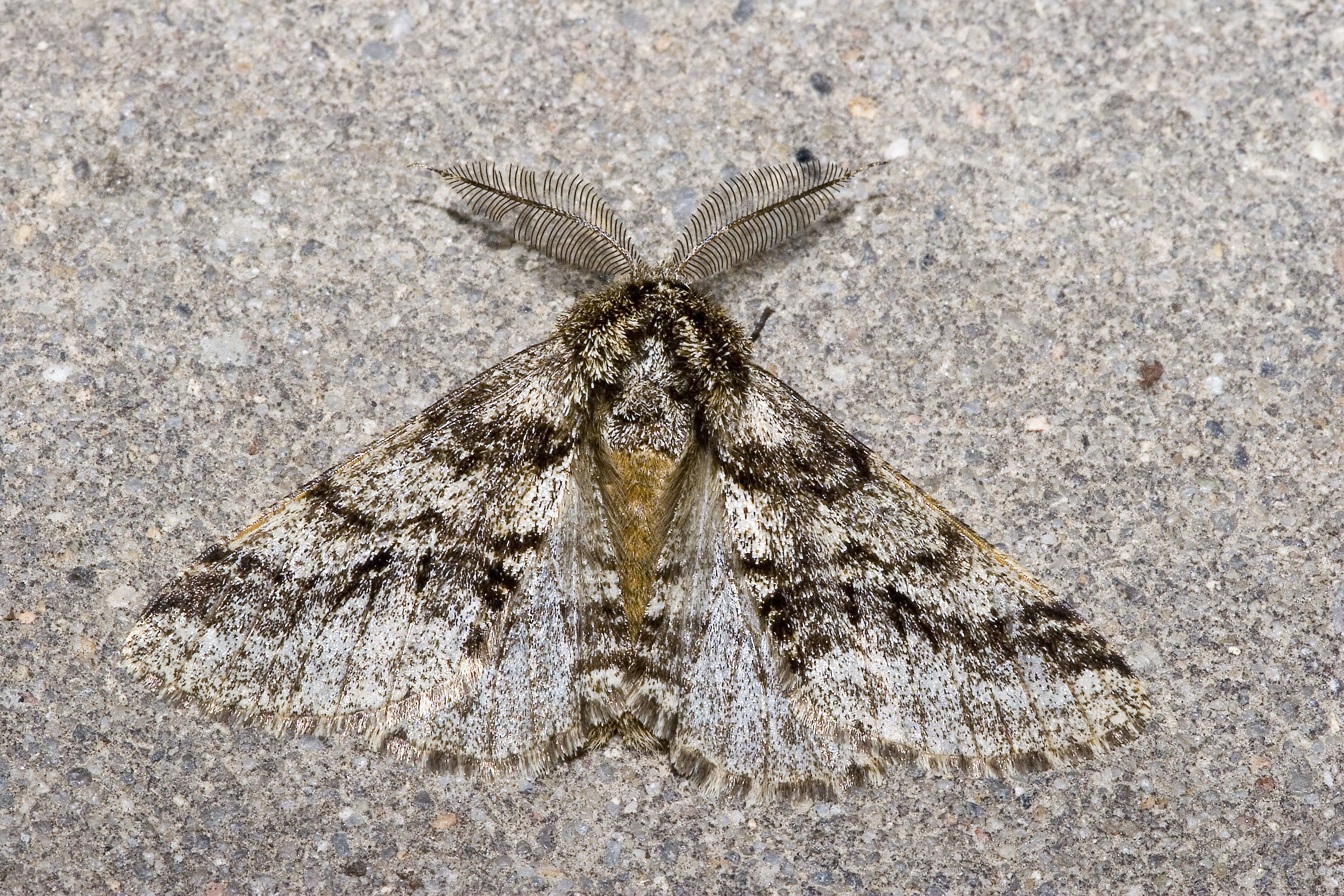
- Male of Lycia hirtaria

Scientific classification
- Domain: Eukaryota
- Kingdom: Animalia
- Phylum: Arthropoda
- Class: Insecta
- Order: Lepidoptera
- Family: Geometridae
- Genus: Lycia
- Species: L. hirtaria

Binomial name
- Lycia hirtaria (Clerck, 1759)

= Brindled beauty =

Species of moth

The brindled beauty (Lycia hirtaria) is a Palearctic moth belonging to the family Geometridae.

== Subspecies ==
- Lycia hirtaria cataloniae Vojnits & Mészáros, 1973
- Lycia hirtaria diniensis (Oberthür, 1913)
- Lycia hirtaria hanoviensis (Heymons, 1891)
- Lycia hirtaria hirtaria (Clerck, 1760)
- Lycia hirtaria istriana (Galvagni, 1901)
- Lycia hirtaria pusztae Vojnits, 1971
- Lycia hirtaria uralaria (Krulikovsky, 1909)

== Distribution ==
This species can be found in most of Europe, including Russia, Caucasus, Transcaucasia, Asia Minor, South Siberia, Yakutia, Russian Far East, Sakhalin and Japan.

== Habitat ==
These moths prefer woodland and suburban areas.

== Description ==
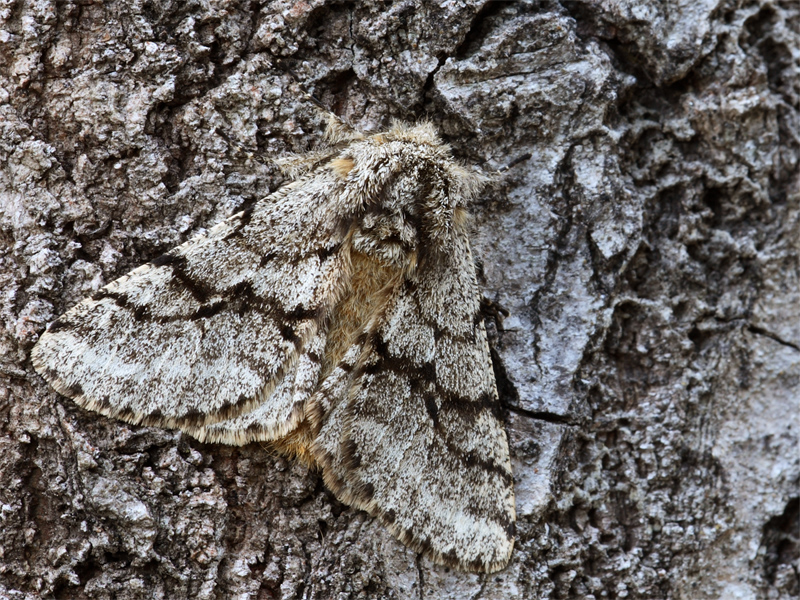
Female of Lycia hirtaria

The brindled beauty has a wingspan of 4–5 cm. It is a large-bodied furry moth, which has a pattern which provides near-perfect camouflage on tree trunks and also gives the moth its name. The forewing ground colour is usually grey with black dusting. There is a curved anterior and a curved exterior cross line limiting the midfield. The Hindwings are also grey and have two or three crosslines. The females have a pale yellow suffusion on the wings and the front edges of their forewings are paler. The males show large comb-like antennae.

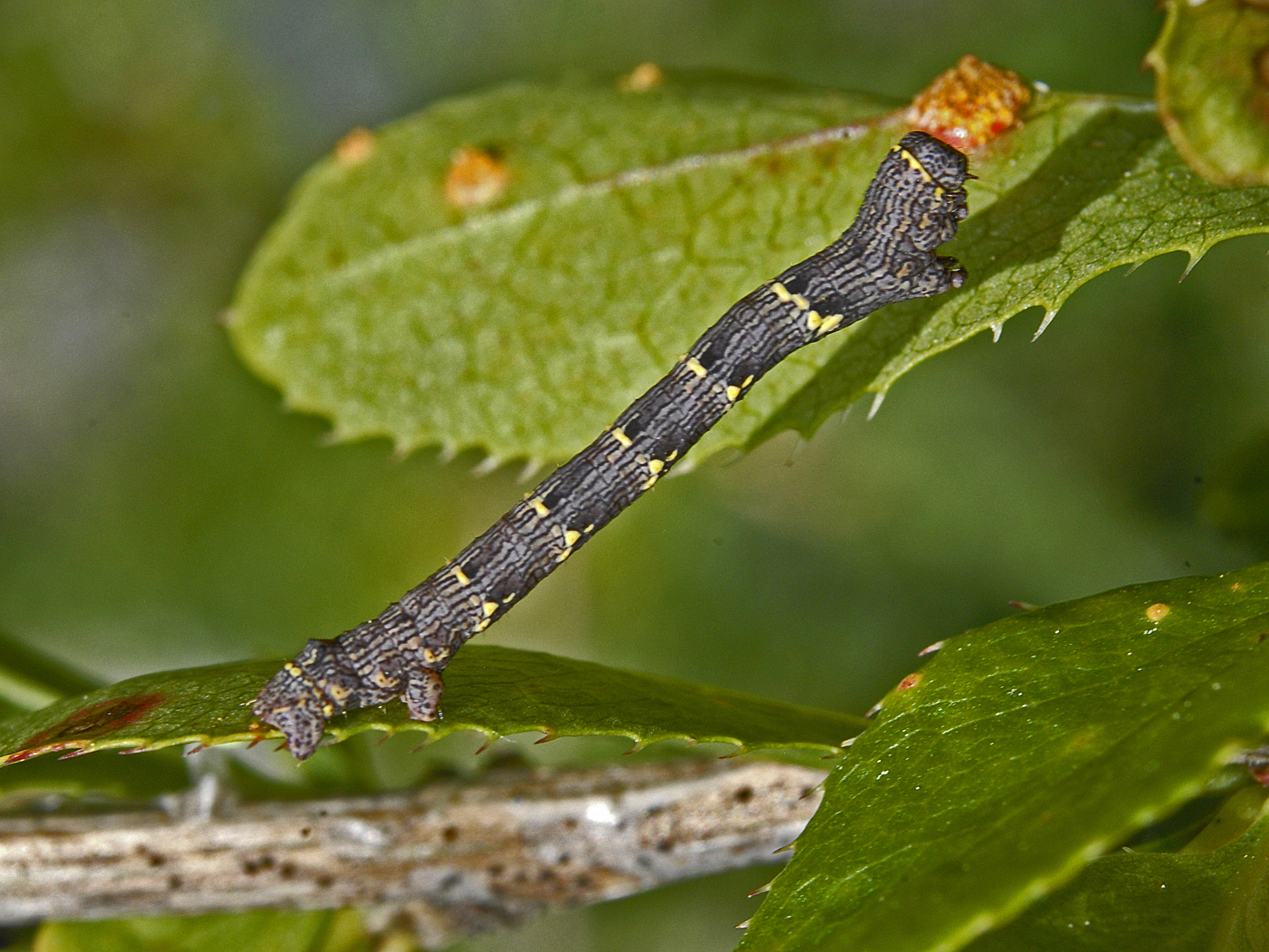
Young caterpillar of Lycia hirtaria

Variation female-ab. terroraria Krulik. is described as unicolorous grey, with weak traces of the lines on the veins of the forewing. Female -ab. fumaria Haw. is fuscous or smoky black, in extreme examples entirely unmarked.- diniensis Ob. differs little from the name-type, but the lines appear to be very strong and thick. Figured without description. Basses-Alpes.- ab. fasciata [Prout] is a beautiful modification of diniensis with the antemedian line double and with a blackish band extending from the median line of the forewing to the subterminal. Le Canadel. Var, France, - ab. flavescens [Prout] may be taken as the name of the more yellow-mixed form which is common in England, N. France, etc.- ab. congeneraria Hbn. has the antemedian and postmedian lines very distinctly double. Possibly forms a separate race in Algeria - istriana Galv. is a large, whitish-mixed form from Istria- hanoviensis Heymons is a small race, more densely scaled, the ground-colour more mixed with ochreous-yellow, the dark markings extended into strong suffusions.

== Biology ==
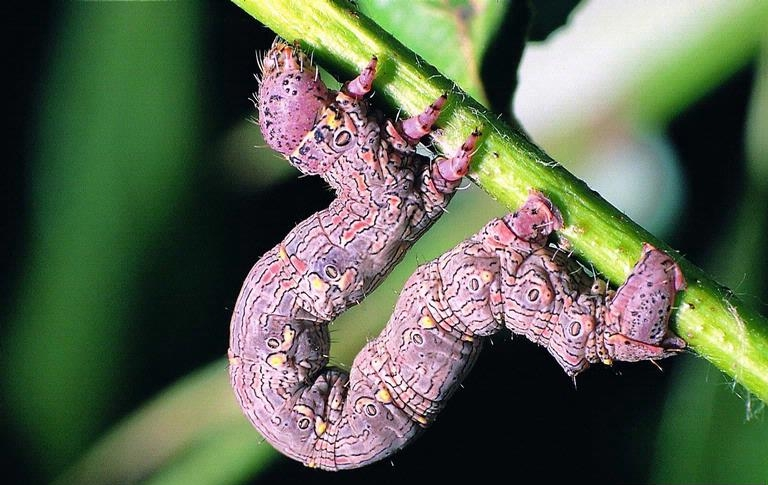
Adult caterpillar of Lycia hirtaria

The brindled beauty is nocturnal. The moths fly from March to the end of May, and the males are attracted to light.

The egg is ellipsoid, micropylar and somewhat concave and granulated; the rest of the surface somewhat glossy, the granulation discernible on strong magnification.

The caterpillar of the brindled beauty ranges from greyish-green or brown in colour purplish, with thread-like longitudinal black lines and with yellow marks near the segment incisions.

The caterpillar is polyphagous, mainly feeding from late spring to early summer on broad-leaved trees and deciduous shrubs (Betula, Quercus, Alnus, Fraxinus, Ulmus, Salix, Populus, Berberis, Ribes, Rosa, Rubus, Filipendula, Malus, Sorbus, Crataegus, Prunus, Tilia, Rhamnus, Vaccinium). The pupa overwinters.

== See also ==
- Lepidoptera
- Moth
- Geometridae
