= Hug Wolf =

- Adventure Time episode
- Episode no.: Season 4 Episode 8
- Directed by: Larry Leichliter (Note: Director); Adam Muto (Note: Creative director); Nick Jennings (Note: Art director)
- Written by: Somvilay Xayaphone; Bert Youn
- Story by: Patrick McHale; Kent Osborne; Pendleton Ward
- Production code: 1008-084
- Original air date: May 14, 2012
- Running time: 11 minutes

Episode chronology
| ← Previous "In Your Footsteps" | Next → "Princess Monster Wife" |
- Adventure Time season 4

"Hug Wolf" is the eighth episode of the fourth season of the American animated television series Adventure Time. The episode was written and storyboarded by Somvilay Xayaphone and Bert Youn, from a story by Patrick McHale, Kent Osborne, and Pendleton Ward. It originally aired on Cartoon Network on May 14, 2012.

The series follows the adventures of Finn (voiced by Jeremy Shada), a human boy, and his best friend and adoptive brother Jake (voiced by John DiMaggio), a dog with magical powers to change shape and grow and shrink at will. In this episode, Finn goes through a werewolf-like transformation after an encounter with an Alpha Hug Wolf, turning into a Beta Hug Wolf. It is up to Jake to break the curse and turn Finn back to normal.

The episode came together after Ward drew several werewolf-inspired creatures with a fondness for hugging. The music that accompanies the climax was scored by Casey James Basichis to convey Finn's transformation through music. "Hug Wolf" received largely positive critical reviews, with Oliver Sava of The A.V. Club arguing that the episode was an analogy for the more serious topic of rape.

== Plot ==
While attempting to destroy the Tree of Blight with Jake, Finn is accidentally hugged by a werewolf-like creature. Later that night, after he begins to show signs of a fever, as well as a new-found penchant for hugging, Jake urges Finn to get some sleep. Ominously, in the morning, while walking through the Candy Kingdom, several citizens reveal that Finn appeared before them during the night and aggressively hugged them.

Finn and Jake journey to the library and read about the "Hug Wolf", a lycanthropic creature that transforms into a werewolf in the presence of a full moon and hugs its victims. The curse is spread from higher-level "Alpha" Hug Wolves, to lower-lever "Beta" creatures, of which Finn is now. That night, Jake and BMO try to restrain Finn, but he transforms, breaks free, and goes on a hugging spree in the Candy Kingdom.

The next morning, the citizens of the kingdom imprison Finn in the dungeon. Jake, in turn, leads an angry mob in search of the Alpha Hug Wolf. By tempting Cinnamon Bun with a hug, Finn escapes after transforming. Meanwhile, the Alpha Hug Wolf corners Jake and his mob, but Finn shows up. Finn and the wolf start hugging each other, which seems to act as a cure for the curse. Finn is returned to his former state, as is the wolf, who is revealed to be a beautiful woman. The episode ends with the woman turning into another Tree of Blight, scaring Jake.

== Production ==
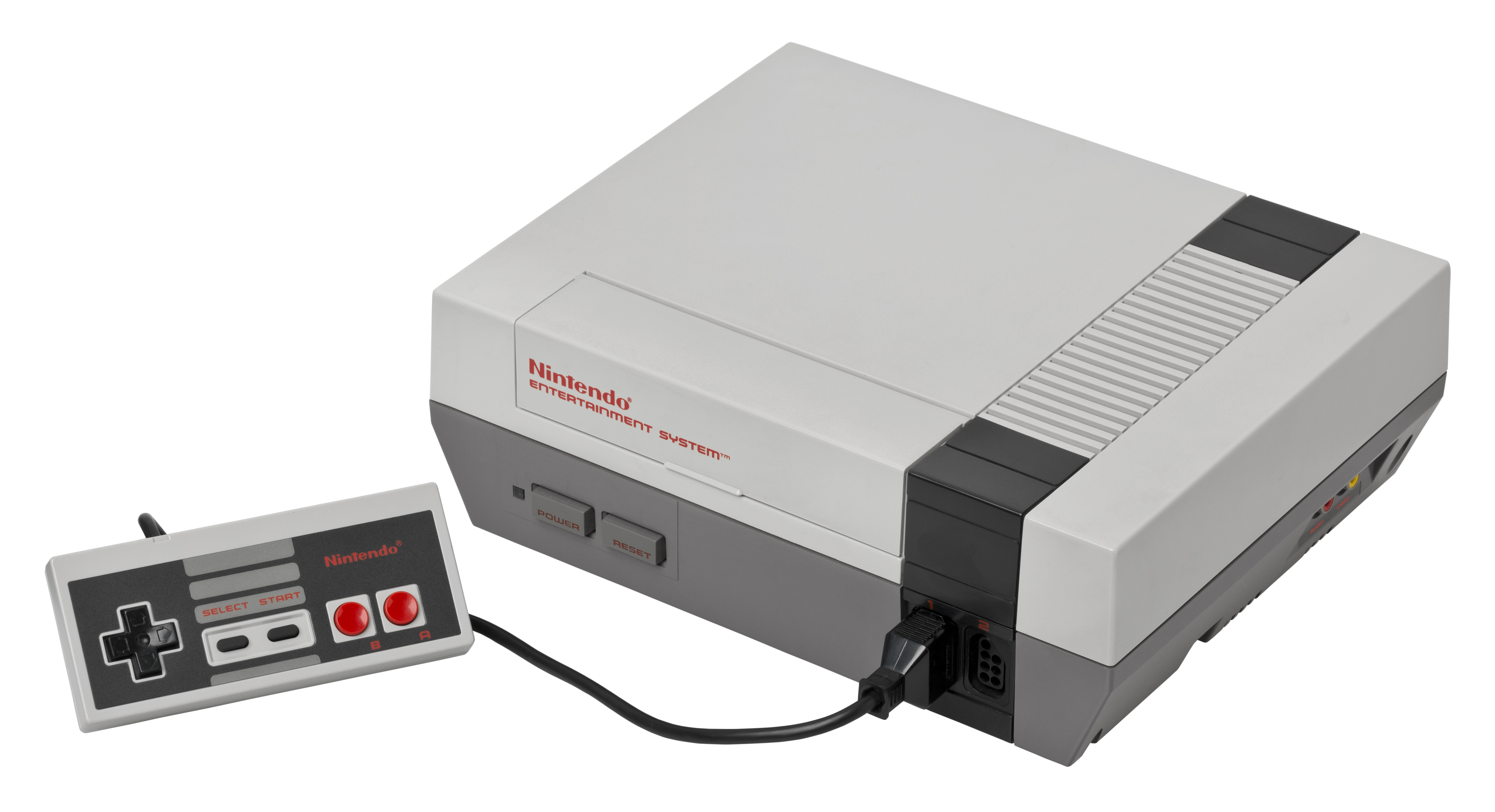
The music for the episode's climax made use of 8bit Nintendo Entertainment System synths that were mixed with distortion.

"Hug Wolf" was written and storyboarded by Somvilay Xayaphone and Bert Youn, from a story developed by series creator Pendleton Ward, Patrick McHale, and Kent Osborne. The episode came together after Ward drew several werewolf-inspired creatures with a fondness for hugging. He felt that the resulting story would be humorous, and the episode came into being. In addition, Ward himself voiced the father of the gumdrop girl Finn almost attacks during one of his hugging sprees. All of the lines were improvised while Ward was in the recording booth.

The music that accompanies the climactic showdown between Finn and the Alpha Hugwolf was composed by Casey James Basichis. The composer thought up several novel ways to convey Finn's transformation through music, including "burying 8bit NES synths in distortion, playing guitar with my girlfriend's many fur coats, [and] screaming into pillows". He eventually settled on using fur coats to produce a "warm, woolly" sound. The music's beat was crafted to sound like "unrelenting static electricity".

== Reception ==
"Hug Wolf" aired on Cartoon Network on May 14, 2012. The episode ranked as the number one telecast of the week among boys aged 6 to 11, and 2 to 11, and it was also the number one telecast of the day among children aged 6 to 11, and 2 to 11. The episode first saw physical release as part of the 2014 DVD, The Suitor, which included 16 episodes from the series' first five seasons. It was later re-released as part of the complete fourth season DVD in October 2014.

Oliver Sava of The A.V. Club awarded the episode a "B+", arguing that the episode was an analogy for the more serious topic of rape. He concluded that, "There's no significant world building or a talking snail cliff hanger, but 'Hug Wolf' is a bizarre, clever episode with some great one-liners and visual gags. It's not as madcap as some episodes, but it mines its central concept for all it can, squeezing out as much humor as possible from a hug-rape story."
