= Big Bear (disambiguation) =

Big Bear was a Cree chief who is most notable for the North-West Rebellion.

Big Bear may also refer to:

== Characters ==
- Big Bear (comics), a fictional superhero from the Forever People comics
- Big Bear (G.I. Joe), a fictional soldier from the G.I. Joe character line
- Raiden (Fatal Fury) or Big Bear, fictional wrestler from the Fatal Fury series

== Companies and brands ==
- Big Bear Markets, a defunct supermarket chain in San Diego County, California, U.S.
- Big Bear Stores, a defunct supermarket chain in the midwestern United States
- Big Bear Limited, an English food company
- Big Bear Records, a jazz record label
- Marui Big Bear Datsun, a remote control car made by Marui

== Film and television ==
- Big Bear (film), action film directed by Joey Kern
- "Big Bear" (American Pickers), a 2010 television episode

== People ==
- Mecosta, a 19th-century Potawatomi chief also known as Big Bear
- Big Bear (American football) (1889–1959), Native American professional football player
- Owen Benjamin (born 1980), alt-right internet personality

== Places ==
- Big Bear Lake, a reservoir in California, United States
  - Big Bear Valley, the valley which includes the lake and surrounding cities
  - Big Bear Lake, California, a city near the reservoir
  - Big Bear City, California, a town near the reservoir
  - Big Bear Discovery Center, a facility near the reservoir

== Other ==
- Ursa Major, a constellation
- Michigan–Michigan State men's soccer rivalry, American college soccer rivalry which plays for the Big Bear Trophy

== See also ==
- Great Bear (disambiguation)
