= Bear (nickname) =

People nicknamed Bear or the Bear include:

- Albert the Bear (c. 1100–1170), Margrave of Brandenburg
- James Brady (1940–2014), press secretary to U.S. President Ronald Reagan and shooting victim
- Bear Bryant (1913–1983), American college football coach
- Don Haskins (1930–2008), American college basketball coach
- Dainton Connell (1961–2007), Arsenal hooligan leader known as "The Bear", assistant to the Pet Shop Boys
- Edward Ellice (merchant) (1783–1863), British merchant and politician known as "The Bear"
- Bear Grylls (born 1974), British adventurer and television presenter
- Bear McCreary (born 1979), musician and composer
- Bear Pascoe (born 1986), former American football tight end
- Bear Rinehart (born 1980), American singer
- Michael Taliferro (1961–2006), American film and television actor and sportsman
- Owsley Stanley (1935–2011), underground LSD cook known as "The Bear"
- Cameron White (born 1983), Australian cricketer
- Raymond Wolf (1904–1979), American football and baseball player and coach

== Fictional characters ==
- Carmy Berzatto, main character of The Bear TV show

== See also ==
- Bear (disambiguation)
- Bear (given name)
- Jack Nicklaus (born 1940), American golfer nicknamed "The Golden Bear"
- Bear (surname)
