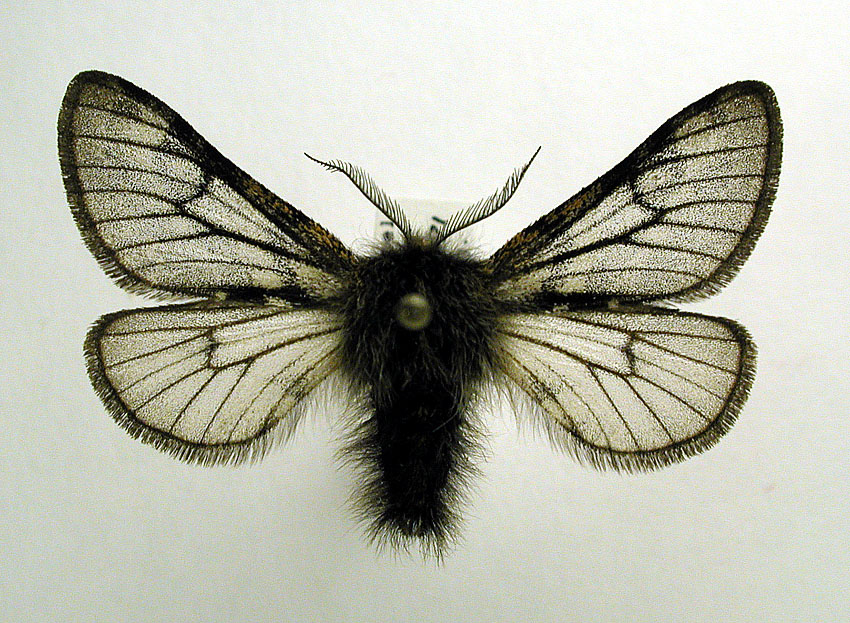

Scientific classification
- Domain: Eukaryota
- Kingdom: Animalia
- Phylum: Arthropoda
- Class: Insecta
- Order: Lepidoptera
- Family: Geometridae
- Genus: Lycia
- Species: L. lapponaria

Binomial name
- Lycia lapponaria (Boisduval, 1840)

= Lycia lapponaria =

Species of imoth

Lycia lapponaria, the Rannoch brindled beauty, is a moth of the family Geometridae. It is found in most of the northern part of the Palearctic realm, including Scotland.

The wingspan is 26–34 mm for males. Females are wingless. Adult males are on wing from March to April in the south and from May to mid June in the north. There is one generation per year.

The larvae feed on Betula nana, Myrica gale and Calluna vulgaris. Larvae can be found in July. It overwinters as a pupa.

== Subspecies ==
- Lycia lapponaria lapponaria
- Lycia lapponaria scotica (Harrison, 1916) (Scotland)
