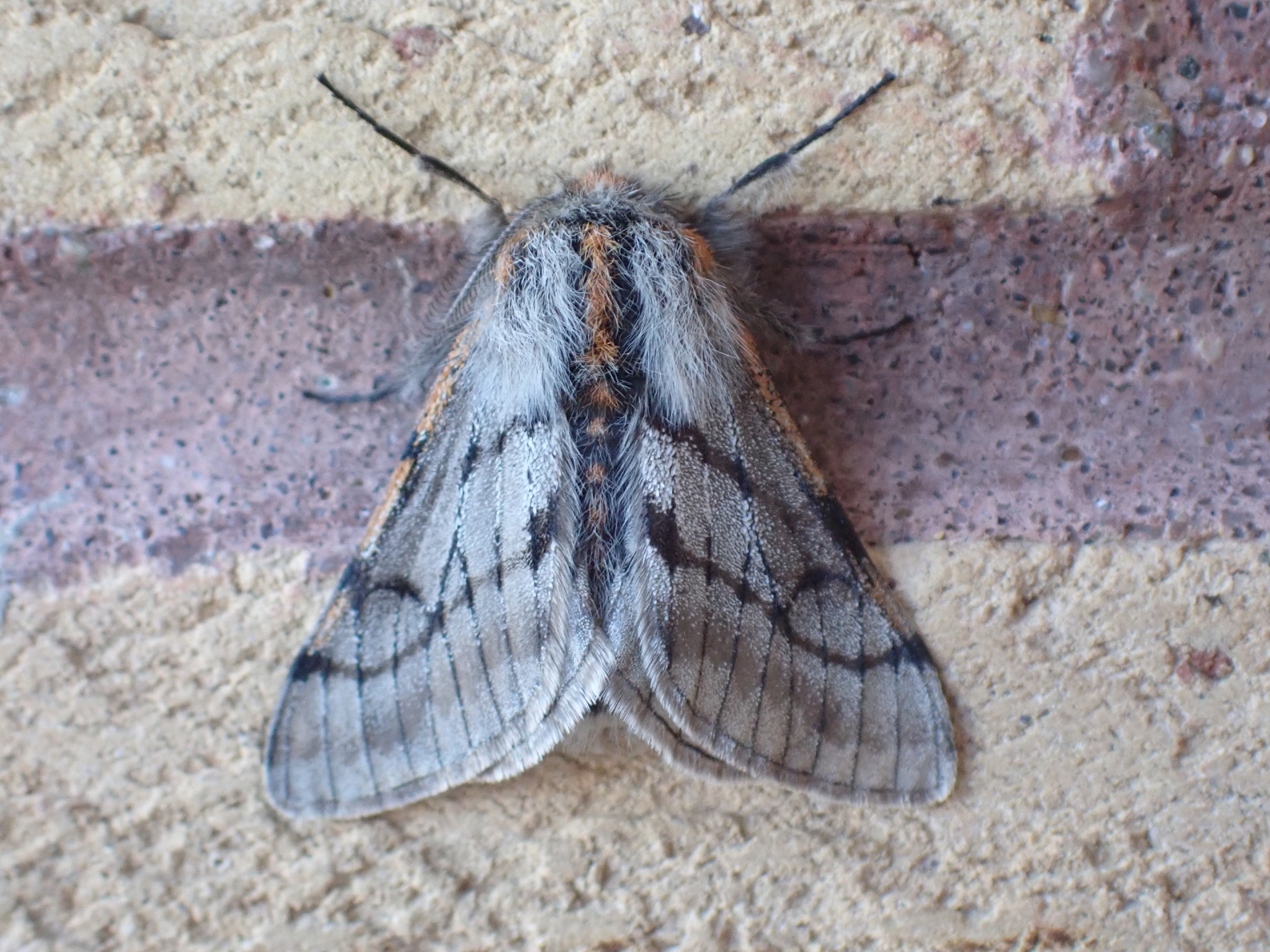

Scientific classification
- Kingdom: Animalia
- Phylum: Arthropoda
- Class: Insecta
- Order: Lepidoptera
- Family: Geometridae
- Genus: Lycia
- Species: L. rachelae

Binomial name
- Lycia rachelae (Hulst, 1896)

Synonyms
- Apocheima rachelae Hulst, 1896

= Lycia rachelae =

Species of moth

Lycia rachelae, commonly known as the twilight moth, is a species of geometrid moth in the family Geometridae.
