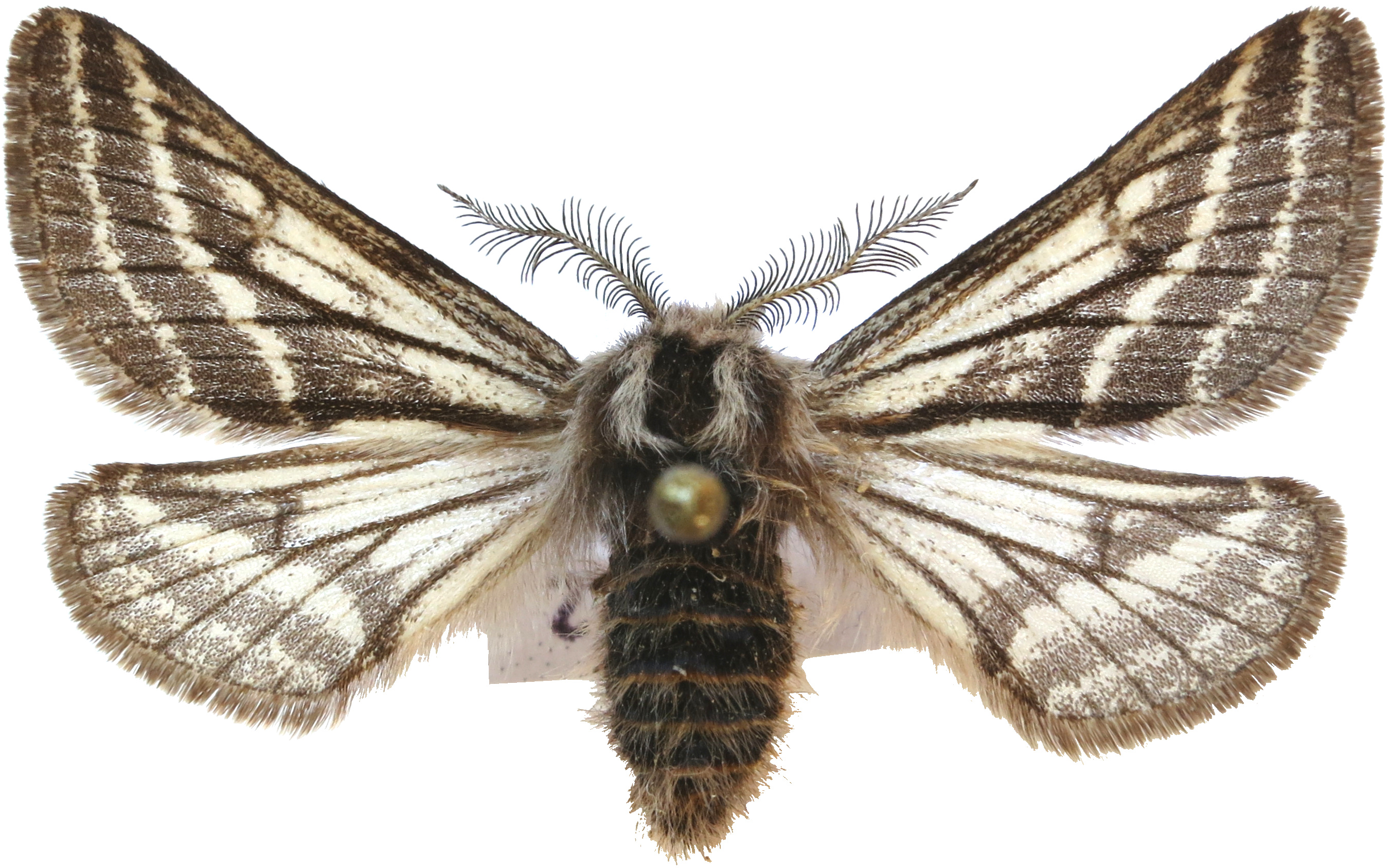
- male imago - Pezinok, Slovakia

Scientific classification
- Domain: Eukaryota
- Kingdom: Animalia
- Phylum: Arthropoda
- Class: Insecta
- Order: Lepidoptera
- Family: Geometridae
- Genus: Lycia
- Species: L. zonaria

Binomial name
- Lycia zonaria (Dennis & Schiffermüller, 1775)

Synonyms
- Geometra zonaria Denis & Schiffermuller, 1775; Ithysia britannica Harrison, 1912; Ithysia rossica Harrison, 1910; Nyssia zonaria

= Lycia zonaria =

Species of moth

Lycia zonaria, the belted beauty, is a moth of the family Geometridae. The species was first described by Michael Denis and Ignaz Schiffermüller in 1775 and it is found in most of Europe.

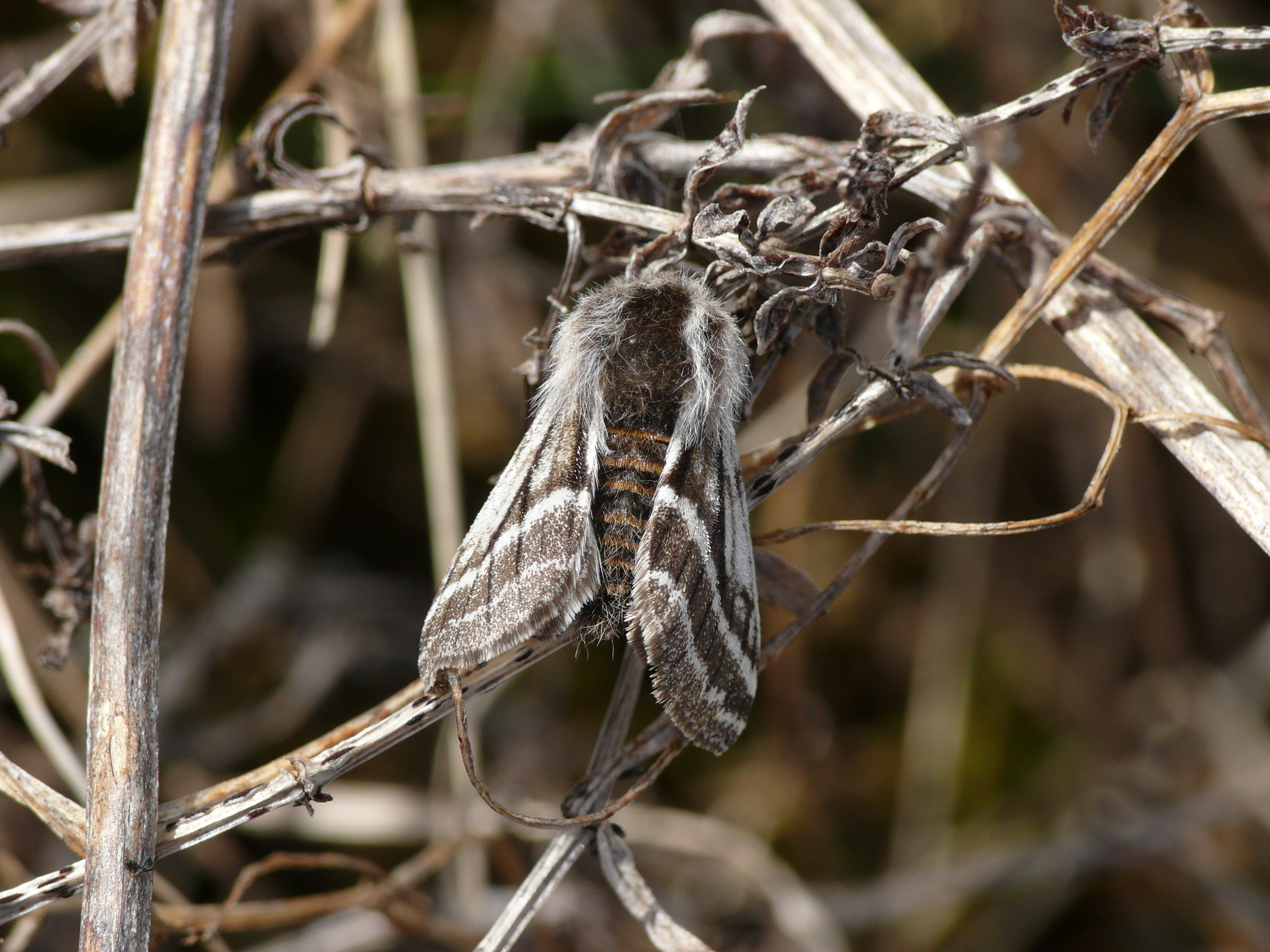
Male

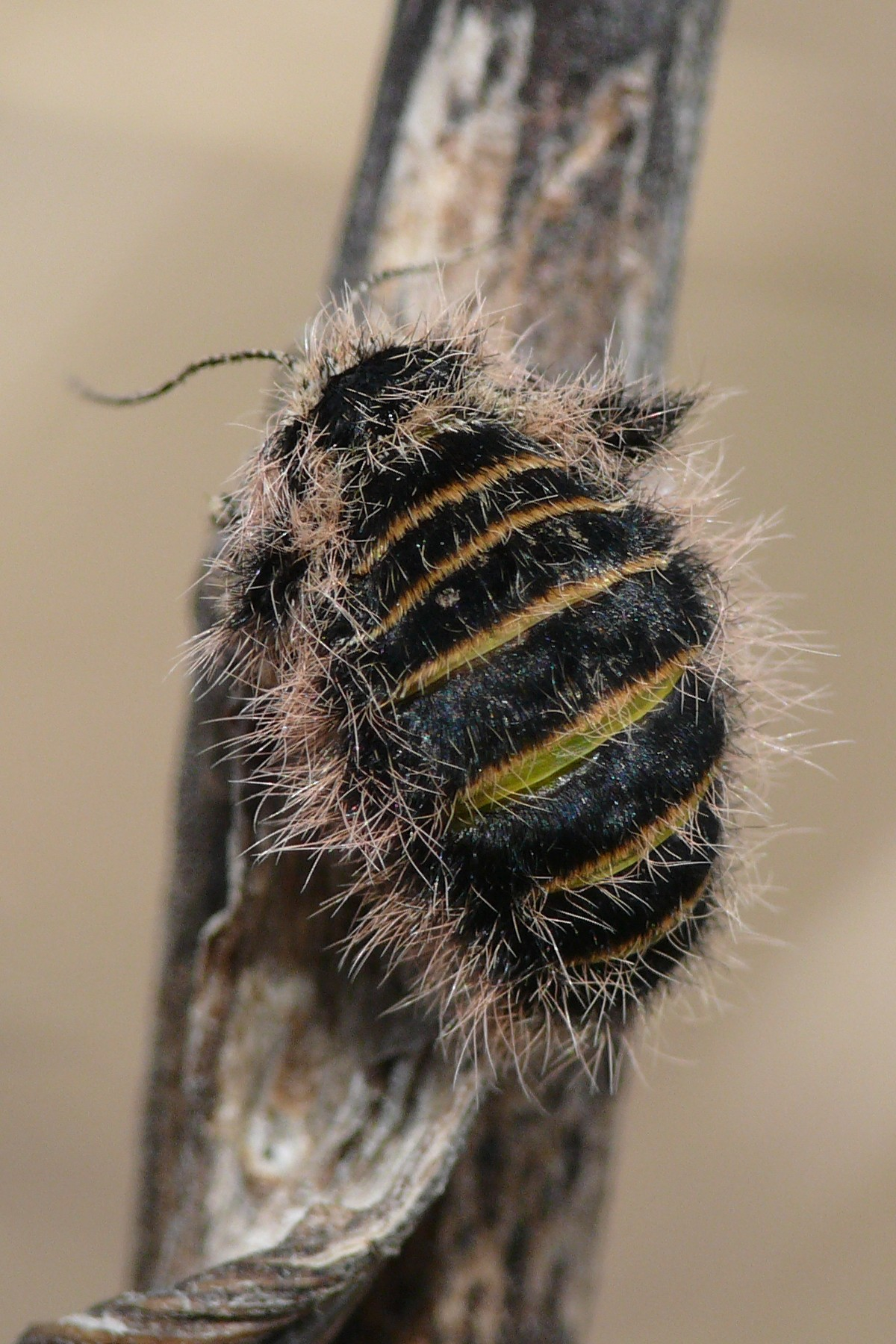
Female

== Distribution ==
Lycia zonaria is found from central Europe, east to the Russian Urals. The populations in England and Wales are ssp. britannica, those from the Urals are ssp. rossica . The nominate subspecies is found in the south west of Spain and France, but is missing in the Mediterranean. The northern occurrence ranges to Denmark and southern Sweden.

== Description ==
The wingspan is 27–30 mm. Females are wingless. Males are variable, but always easy to recognize. Characteristic are the dark veins and broad dark distal area, bounded proximally and traversed by sharply white lines. The female is distinguished by its yellowish abdominal belts. The rudimentary white wings are common to the genus.

== Biology ==
Adult males are on wing from March to April.

The larvae feed on a range of low-growing plants, including Salix repens and Rosa pimpinellifolia.

The species is a typical resident of dry grassland, occurring at forest edges, sandy slopes and heaths.

== Subspecies ==
- Lycia zonaria zonaria
- Lycia zonaria rossica (Harrison, 1910)
- Lycia zonaria britannica (Harrison, 1912)
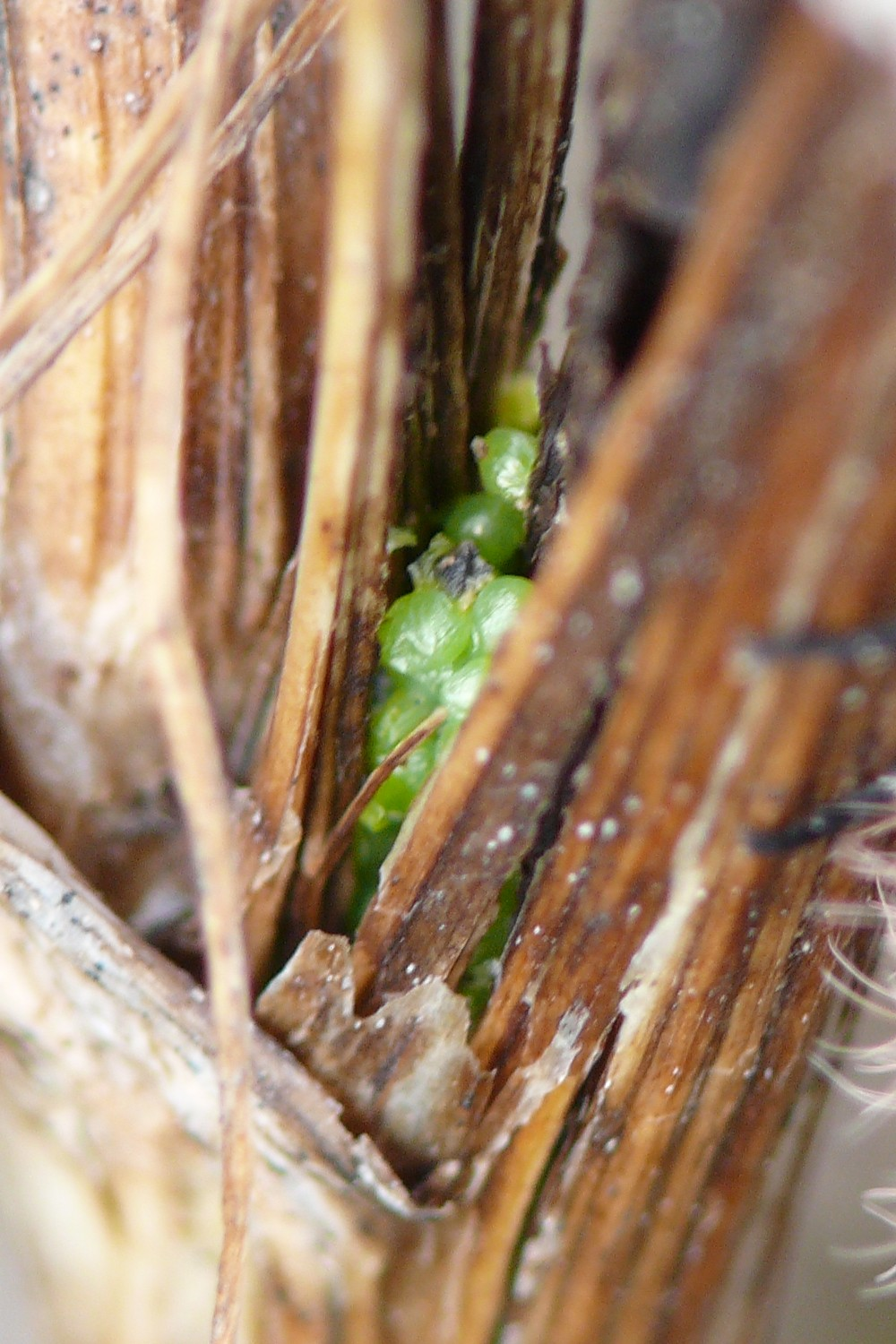
Eggs

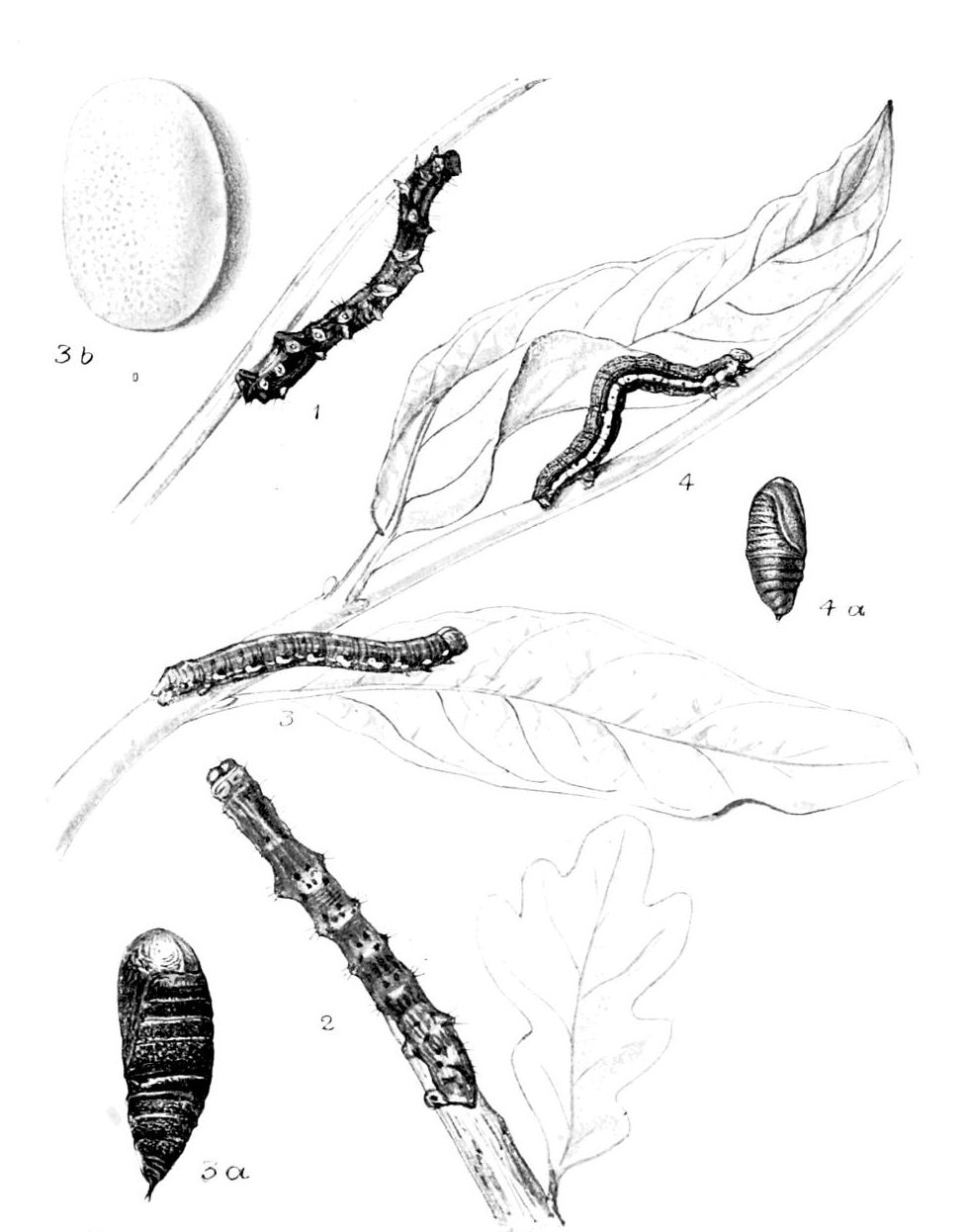
Larva and pupa

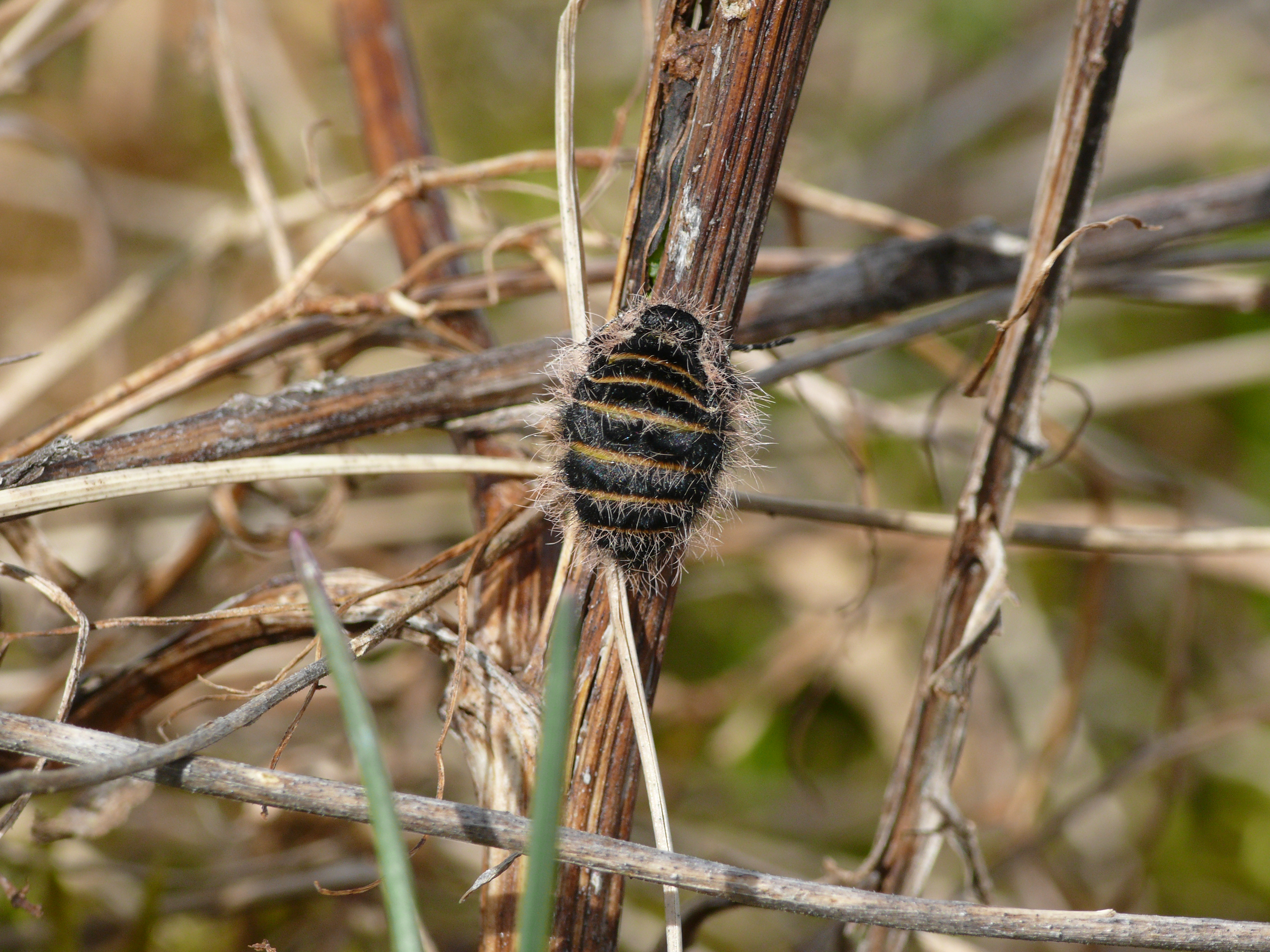
Female

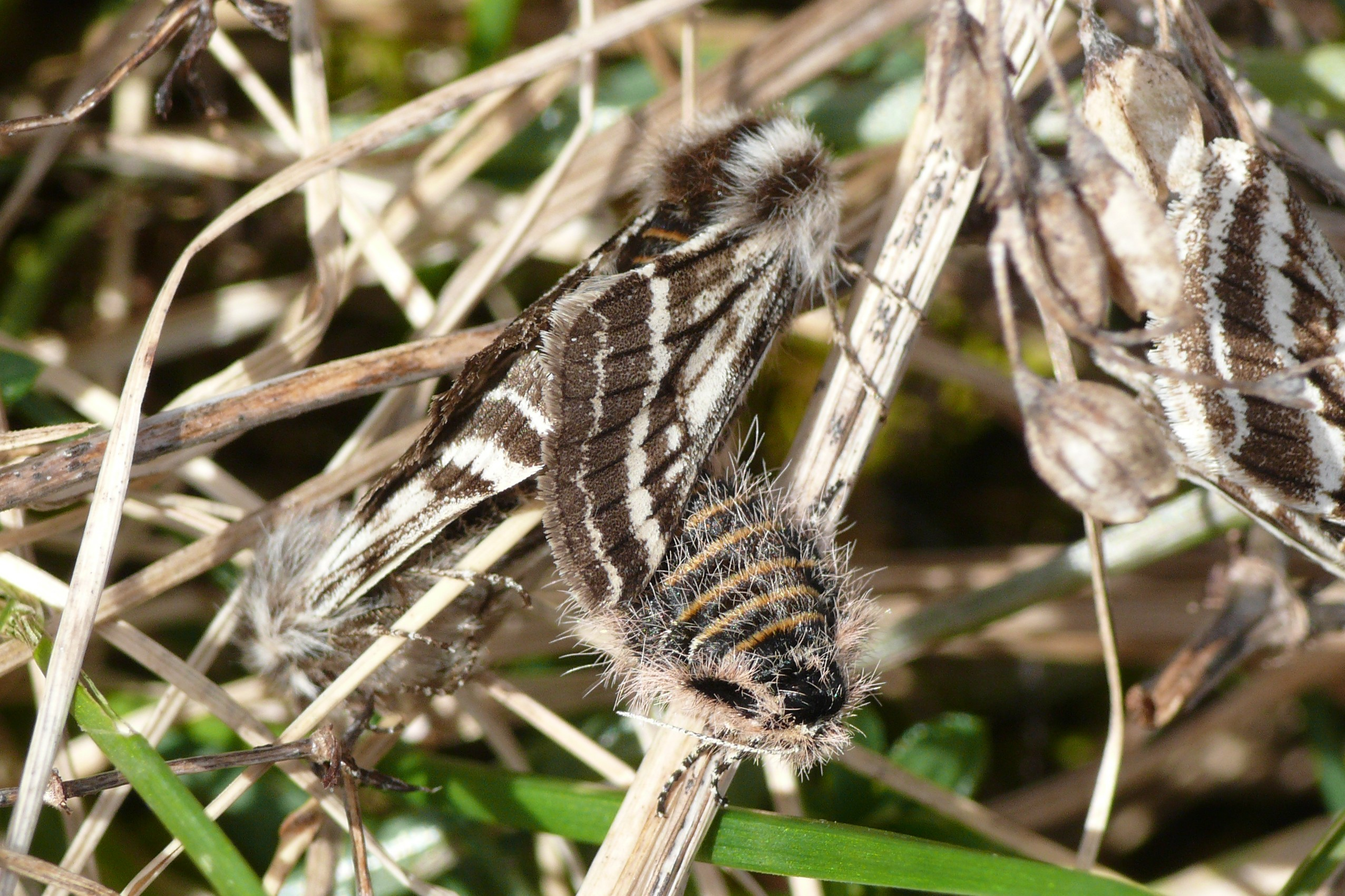
Male and female copulation

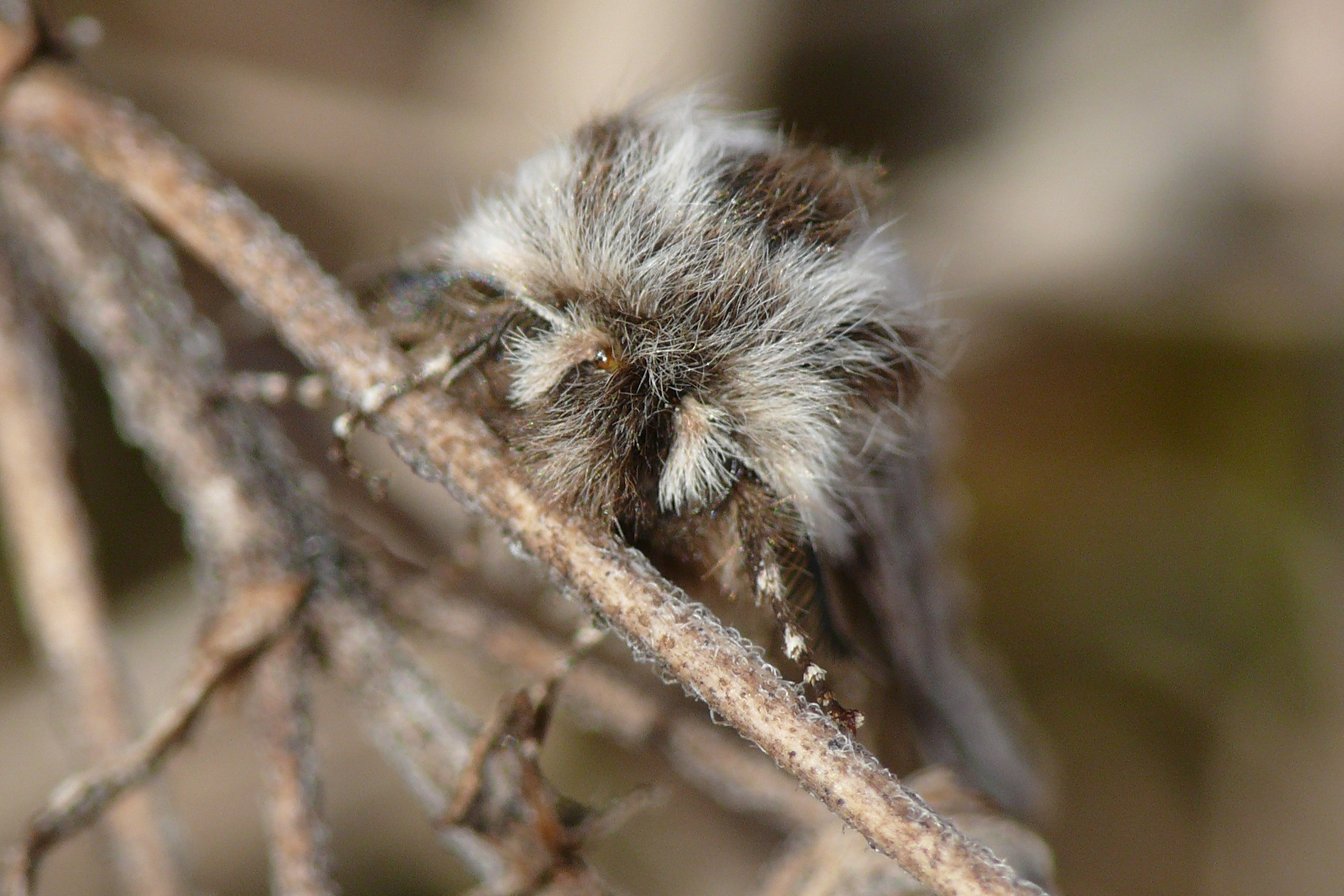
Head-on view

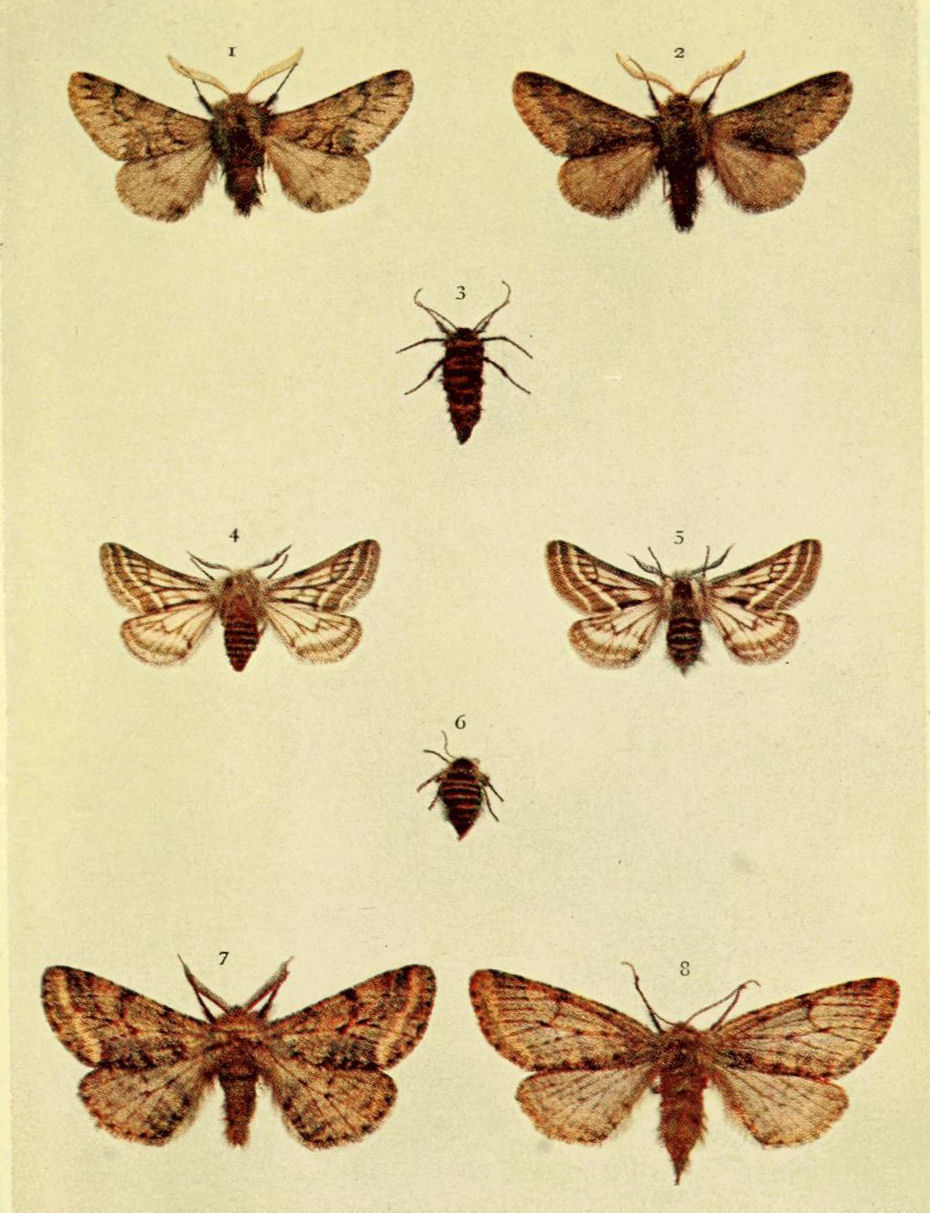
Related species
