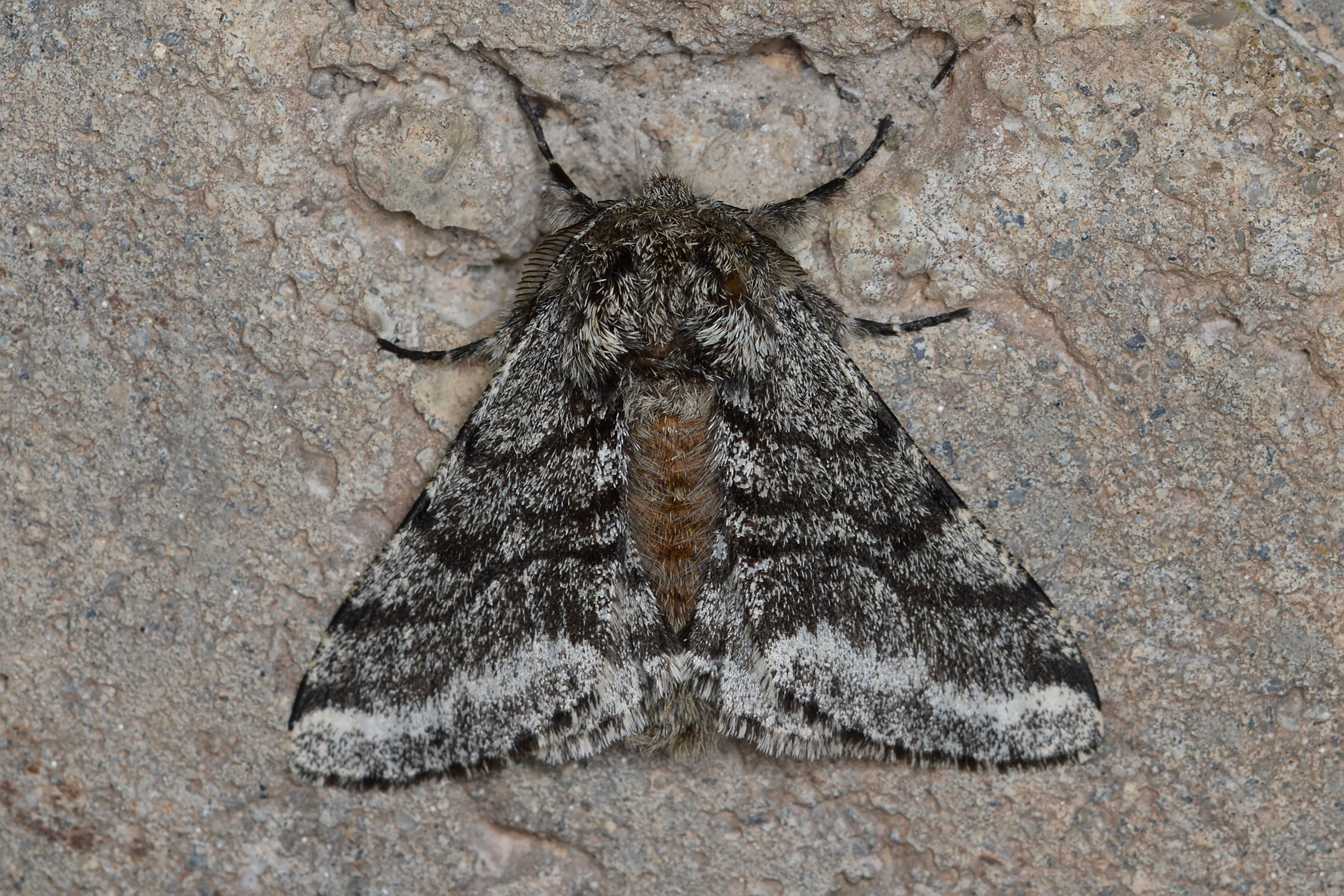

Scientific classification
- Kingdom: Animalia
- Phylum: Arthropoda
- Class: Insecta
- Order: Lepidoptera
- Family: Geometridae
- Genus: Lycia
- Species: L. ursaria

Binomial name
- Lycia ursaria (Walker, 1860)

Synonyms
- Biston ursaria Walker, 1860

= Lycia ursaria =

Species of moth

Lycia ursaria, the stout spanworm moth or bear, is a moth of the family Geometridae. The species was first described by Francis Walker in 1860. It is found in southern Canada and the northern United States, south to New Jersey and Iowa.

The wingspan is about 45 mm. Adults are on wing from March to June in one generation per year.

The larvae feed on the leaves of various broadleaved trees and shrubs, including Alnus, Malus, Fraxinus, Tilia, Betula, Vaccinium, Cornus, Ulmus, Crataegus, Populus and Salix.
