= Glecia Bear =

Cree taleteller and chief

- Nêhiyaw

Cree leader

Personal details
- Born: April 29, 1912 Green Lake, Saskatchewan, Canada
- Died: September 1998 (aged 85–86) Flying Dust First Nation, Canada

Glecia Bear or Nêhiyaw (April 29, 1912 in Green Lake, Saskatchewan – September 1998, Flying Dust First Nation) was a Saskatchewan-born Cree elder and a traditional tale teller. Her stories were recorded and translated by Freda Ahenakew.

She was the first female chief of the Flying Dust First Nation.

== Works ==
In Kthkominawak otbcimowiniwbwa, Glecia Bear tells her life story as a Cree woman. In Wanisinwak iskwesisak : awasisasinahikanis, Glecia Bear recalls being lost in the forest with her little sister when they were eleven and eight years old.

== Bibliography ==
- Wanisinwak iskwesisak : awasisasinahikanis [Two little girls lost in the bush: a Cree story for children]. 1991.
- Kthkominawak otbcimowiniwbwa [Our grandmothers' lives, as told in their own words]. 1992.
