= Brown University Interactive Language =

Brown University Interactive Language (BRUIN) was an introductory programming language developed at Brown University in the late 1960s. It operated in the IBM 360, and was similar to PL/1. The abstract of R. G. Munck's document, "Meeting the Computational Requirements of the University, Brown University Interactive Language" describes BRUIN as "a JOSS-like interpreter and a WATFOR-Like compiler and has a syntax very much like PL/I. It is intended that BRUIN and PL/I will together form a language system which will supply most of the (non-computer science) computational requirements of the university."
