= Bjørnøya (disambiguation) =

Bjørnøya (Norwegian: Bear Island), is a common name for Norwegian islands:

- Bear Island (Norway) in the Svalbard archipelago (known as Bjørnøya in Norwegian)
- Bjørnøya, Aremark, in Aremark Municipality
- Bjørnøya, Aurskog-Høland, in Aurskog-Høland Municipality
- Bjørnøya, Bamble, in Bamble Municipality
- Bjørnøya, Bodø, in Bodø Municipality
- Bjørnøya, Bømlo, in Bømlo Municipality
- Bjørnøya, Bremanger, in Bremanger Municipality
- Bjørnøya, Eidskog, in Eidskog Municipality
- Bjørnøya, Haram, in Haram Municipality
- Bjørnøya, Hitra, in Hitra Municipality
- Bjørnøya, Hustadvika, in the municipality of Hustadvika Municipality
- Bjørnøya, Kvænangen, in Kvænangen Municipality
- Bjørnøya, Larvik, in lake Farris in Larvik Municipality
- Bjørnøya, Lurøy, in Lurøy Municipality
- Bjørnøya, Måsøy, in Måsøy Municipality
- Bjørnøya, Molde, in Molde Municipality
- Bjørnøya, Rygge, in Moss Municipality
- Bjørnøya, Orkland, in Orkland Municipality
- Bjørnøya, Rennebu, in Rennebu Municipality
- Bjørnøya, Rødøy, in Rødøy Municipality
- Bjørnøya, Rømskog, in the Rømskog area of Aurskog-Høland Municipality
- Bjørnøya, Stjørdal, in Stjørdal Municipality
- Bjørnøya, Sveio, in Sveio Municipality
- Bjørnøya, Tromsø, in Tromsø Municipality
- Bjørnøya, Vestvågøy, in Vestvågøy Municipality

== Related names ==
- Bjørnøy, Stavanger
- Bjørnøyan, Nesset
- Bjørnøyane, Flekkefjord
- Bjørnøyane, Askvoll
- Bjørnøyaunet, Snillfjord
