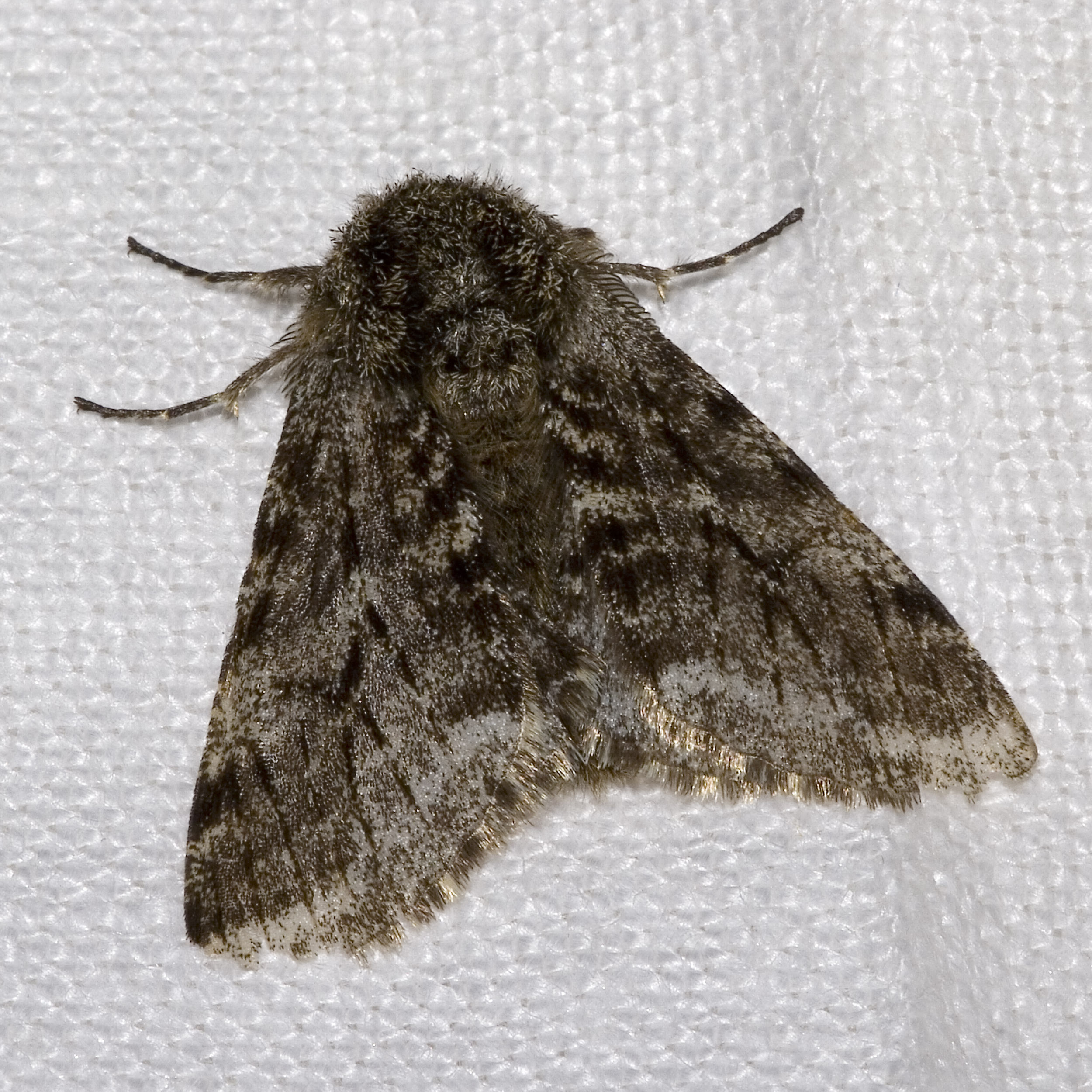

Scientific classification
- Kingdom: Animalia
- Phylum: Arthropoda
- Clade: Pancrustacea
- Class: Insecta
- Order: Lepidoptera
- Family: Geometridae
- Tribe: Bistonini
- Genus: Lycia; Hübner, 1825

Synonyms
- Nyssia Duponchel, 1829; Melanocoma Harrison, 1910; Poecilopsis Harrison, 1910

= Lycia (moth) =

Genus of moths

Lycia is a genus of moths in the family Geometridae.

== Species ==
- Lycia alpina (Sulzer, 1776)
- Lycia degtjarevae Viidalepp, 1986
- Lycia florentina (Stefanelli, 1882)
- Lycia graecarius (Staudinger, 1861)
- Lycia hanoviensis Heymons, 1891
- Lycia hirtaria (Clerck, 1759)
- Lycia incisaria (Lederer, 1870)
- Lycia isabellae (Harrison, 1914)
- Lycia lapponaria (Boisduval, 1840)
- Lycia liquidaria (Eversmann, 1848)
- Lycia necessaria (Zeller, 1849)
- Lycia pomonaria (Hübner, 1792)
- Lycia rachelae (Hulst, 1896)
- Lycia ursaria (Walker, 1860)
- Lycia ypsilon (Forbes, 1885)
- Lycia zonaria (Denis & Schiffermüller, 1775)

== Hybrids ==
- Lycia hirtaria × pomonaria
- Lycia isabellae × pomonaria
