= Behr syndrome =

- Other names: Optic atrophy in early childhood, associated with ataxia, spasticity, Intellectual disability, and posterior column sensory loss
- Behr syndrome has an autosomal recessive pattern of inheritance.

Behr syndrome is characterized by the association of early-onset optic atrophy with spinocerebellar degeneration resulting in ataxia, pyramidal signs, peripheral neuropathy and developmental delay.

Although it is an autosomal recessive disorder, heterozygotes may still manifest much attenuated symptoms. Autosomal dominant inheritance also being reported in a family. Recently a variant of OPA1 mutation with phenotypic presentation like Behr syndrome is also described. Some reported cases have been found to carry mutations in the OPA1, OPA3 or C12ORF65 genes which are known causes of pure optic atrophy or optic atrophy complicated by movement disorder.

== Signs and symptoms ==
Onset : Early childhood

Progression: Chronic progressive

Clinical: Cerebellar ataxia plus syndrome / Optic Atrophy Plus Syndrome

Ocular: Optic atrophy, nystagmus, scotoma, and bilateral retrobulbar neuritis.

Other: Intellectual disability, myoclonic epilepsy, spasticity, and posterior column sensory loss. Tremor in some cases.

Musculoskeletal

Contractures, lower limbs, Achilles tendon contractures, Hamstring contractures, Adductor longus contractures

Systemic

Hypogonadotrophic hypogonadism.

== Genetics ==
Behr syndrome is autosomal recessive which means the defective gene is located on an autosome, and two copies of the gene - one inherited from each parent - are required to be born with the disorder. The parents of an individual with an autosomal recessive disorder both carry one copy of the defective gene, but are usually not affected by the disorder. Autosomal dominant inheritance also being reported.

Compound heterozygous mutations in OPA1 gene were reported. Molecular genetic studies revealed a homozygous mutation in the C19ORF12 gene which has been previously reported in patients with mitochondrial membrane protein-associated neurodegeneration (MPAN) a variant of neurodegeneration with brain iron accumulation (NBIA).

== Pathology ==
Autopsy on one of the sister with Behr Syndrome revealed central atrophy of the optic nerves and total disarray of the normal laminar pattern of the lateral geniculate nucleus, dropout of neurons, and gliosis. There were numerous axonal spheroids in the neuropil. Similar spheroids with cell loss and gliosis were also observed in other thalamic nuclei and, rarely, in the pallida.

== Diagnosis ==
=== Neuroimaging ===
Diffuse, symmetric white matter abnormalities were demonstrated by magnetic resonance imaging (MRI) suggesting that Behr syndrome may represent a disorder of white matter associated with an unknown biochemical abnormality.

== See also ==
- List of systemic diseases with ocular manifestations
- Leber's Hereditary Optic Atrophy
- Mitochondrial Disorders
