= Bear Inn, Cowbridge =

Inn in Cowbridge, Vale of Glamorgan, Wales

Coordinates: 51°27′44″N 3°27′0″W

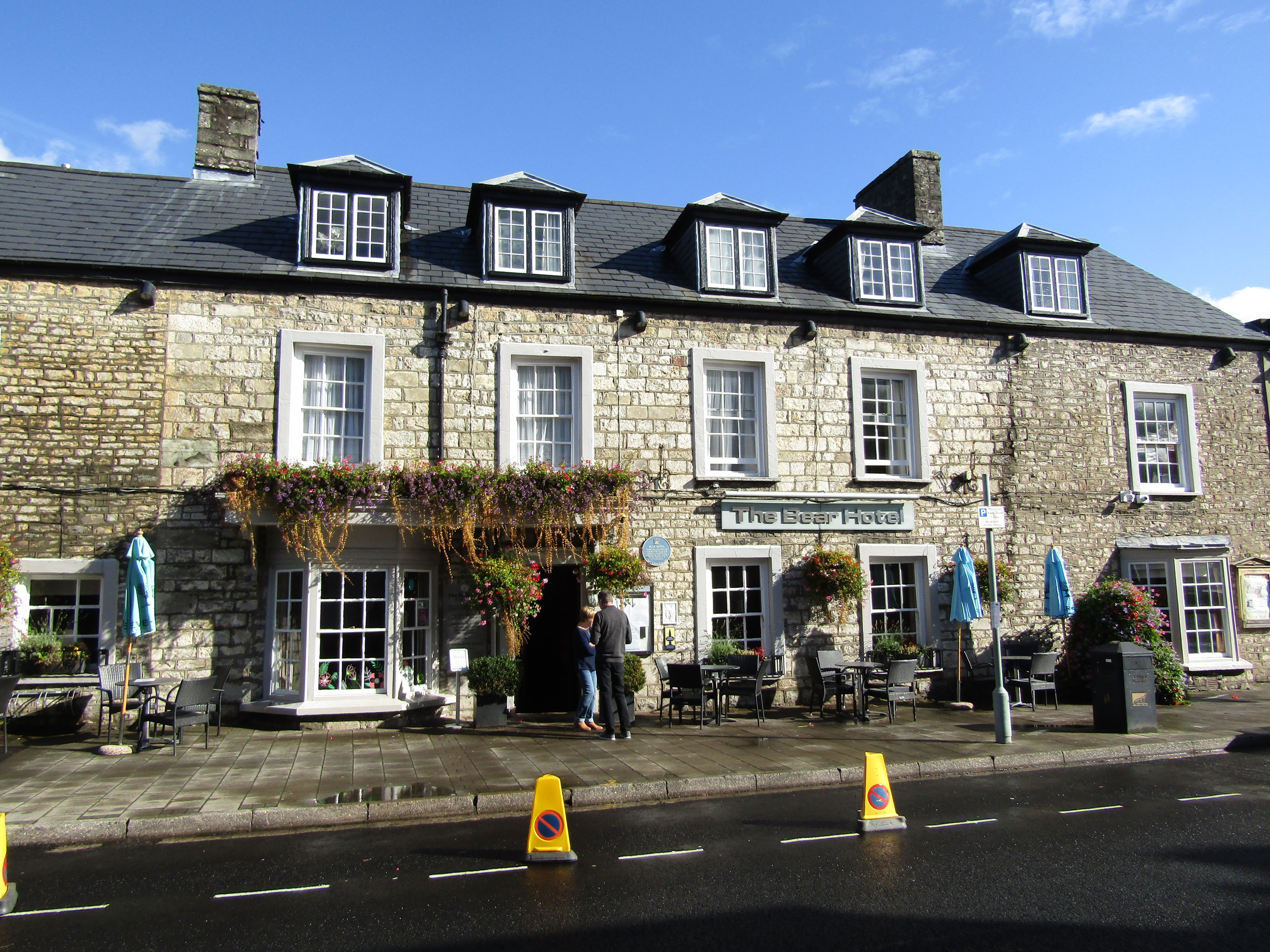
Bear Hotel

The Bear Inn, today known as The Bear Hotel, is an inn on Cowbridge High Street in Cowbridge, Vale of Glamorgan, south Wales. It was built around the 12th century as the town house for the manor house of Llanmihangel Place located outside of Cowbridge.

The block stone building has a blue plaque on the front, marking its historical significance. It became a Grade II listed building on 12 May 1963.

It was once probably a three-unit, lateral chimney, hall-house, later converted into a storeyed house. It has undergone much alteration over the years, and little remains of the original except the fireplaces, one of which is in poor condition. The fireplace lintels of carved stone are notable. The hall fireplace has two shields, one bearing a reversed lion rampant and the other a trefoil. The hall contains heavy ceiling beams, dated to the late 16th century. The plastered ceiling in the inner room is dated to the early 18th century. On the first floor there are plain-chamfered ceiling beams and roof trusses, although this is obscured.

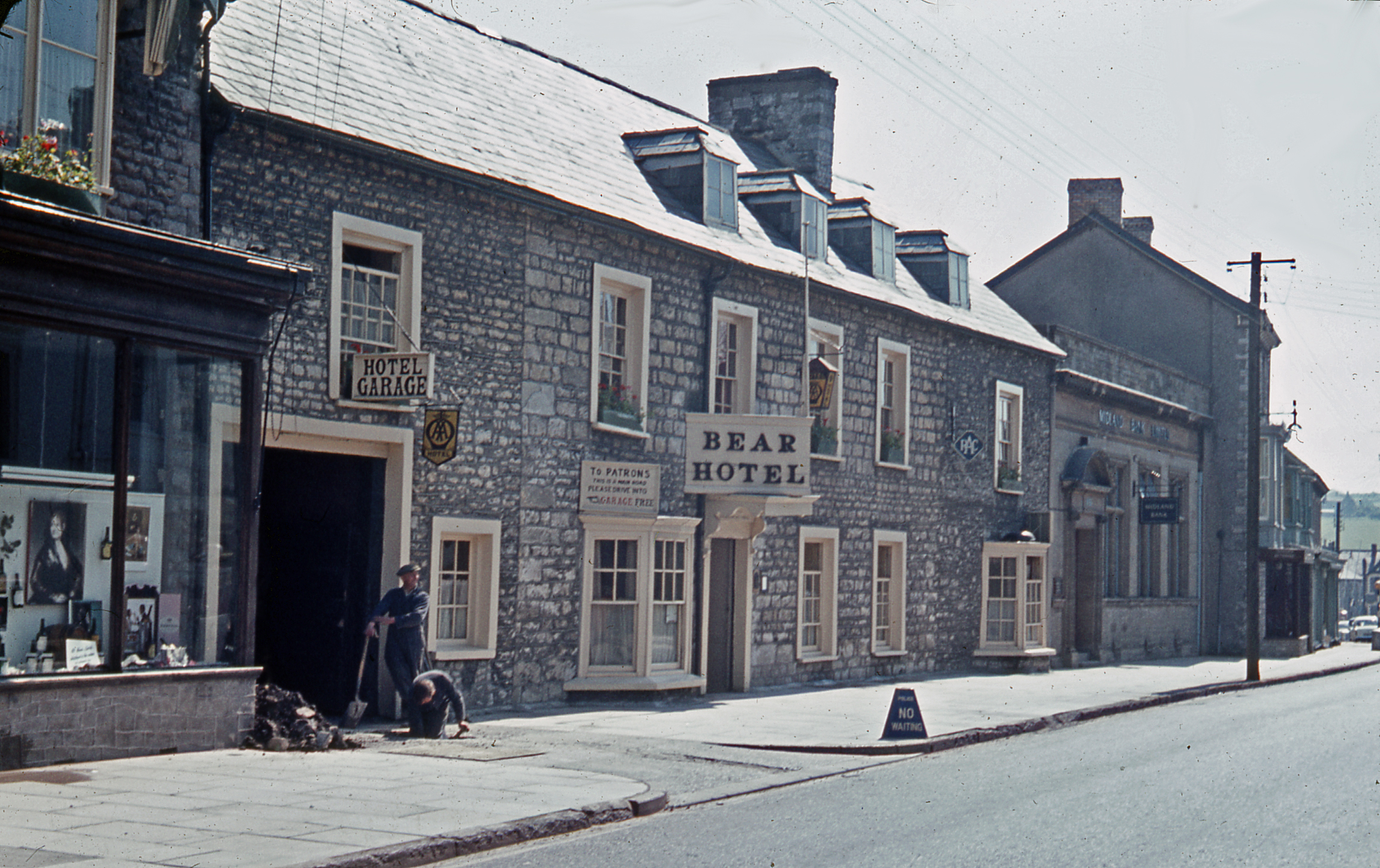
The Bear Hotel in 1962

It became a pub during the 18th century - noted as The Bear in 1736, and around this time the first floor was converted into an assembly room. The High Sheriff for the county would meet with noblemen of the county at the Bear Inn. The Glamorganshire Agricultural Society was established in 1772 at the inn. In this era, the inn served as a stopping point for those in need of changing horses, while other similar establishments, such as the Cowbridge Arms, Royal Oak, and Spread Eagle did not offer such a service. The northern side of the house once had wing attached to it during the medieval period but this no longer exists. In the early 19th century, Christopher Bradley was succeeded by Michael Glover as inn host. In the early 20th century, the county Court occasionally sat at the Bear Inn when it had such needs in Cowbridge. Nearby is the Cowbridge Grammar School.
