= Little Bear =

Little Bear may refer to:

== People ==
- Little Bear (Native American leader), 19th century Cree leader who participated in the 1885 North-West Rebellion
- Danny Little Bear (1926–1991), American professional wrestler
- nickname of Chester Zardis (1900–1990), American jazz bassist

== Places ==
- Little Bear Mountain, a volcano in British Columbia, Canada
- Little Bear Lake (Saskatchewan), Canada
- Little Bear Peak, Colorado, United States
- Little Bear River (Utah), Utah, United States
- Little Bear Brook, New Jersey, United States

== Entertainment ==
- Little Bear (Minarik and Sendak book series), a series of children's picture books written by American author Else Holmelund Minarik and illustrated by Maurice Sendak
  - Little Bear (TV series), an animated children's TV series based upon the books
  - The Little Bear Movie, a 2001 animated direct-to-video film based upon the books
- Little Bear (film), short Irish drama film directed by Daire Glynn and Ger Duffy
- Little Bear series (Waddell and Firth book series), a series of children's picture books written by Irish Writer Martin Waddell and illustrated by British Illustrator Barbara Firth
- "Little Bear" (song), by indie band Guillemots
- The title character in The Indian in the Cupboard, a book

== Other uses ==
- Henderson Little Bear, an American Piper "Cub" replica
- Ursa Minor, also known as Little Bear, a constellation
- Little Bear (train), a former mixed passenger/freight train operated by the Ontario Northland Railway
- Little Bear Fire, a wildfire that began in New Mexico on June 4, 2012
- Little bear or Acronicta lupini, a moth of the family Noctuidae

== See also ==
- The Little Bears, probably the first American comic strip with recurring characters
