= Laura Bear =

British anthropologist

Laura Charlotte Bear MBE FBA (born 1965) is a British anthropologist and academic, specializing in economic anthropology of South Asia and the United Kingdom. She is Professor of Anthropology at the London School of Economics and head of its Department of Anthropology.

== Life ==
Bear's research has focused on India and the United Kingdom. While her early research concerned the effect of austerity on communities in India, she has most recently been studying the effect of the COVID-19 pandemic on vulnerable households in the United Kingdom. She is a member of three sub-groups of the British government's Scientific Advisory Group for Emergencies (SAGE).

Bear has written several articles and journal entries. One of them being in 2016, Bear authored a journal entry on anthropology, capitalism, and ethics, titled, Time as a Technique. She also authored the journal entry, Doubt, conflict, meditation: the anthropology of modern times.

In 2021, Bear was elected a Fellow of the British Academy (FBA), the United Kingdom's national academy for the humanities and social sciences.

Bear was appointed Member of the Order of the British Empire (MBE) in the 2022 New Year Honours for services to anthropology during COVID-19.

== Selected works ==
- Bear, Laura (2007). Lines of the Nation: Indian Railway Workers, Bureaucracy, and the Intimate Historical Self. New York: Columbia University Press. ISBN 978-0231140027.
- Bear, Laura (2015). Navigating austerity: currents of debt along a South Asian river. Stanford, CA: Stanford University Press. ISBN 978-0804789479.
