= In Your Footsteps =

- Adventure Time episode
- Episode no.: Season 4 Episode 7
- Directed by: Larry Leichliter (Note: Director); Nate Cash (Note: Creative director); Nick Jennings (Note: Art director)
- Written by: Tom Herpich; Skyler Page
- Story by: Patrick McHale; Kent Osborne; Pendleton Ward
- Production code: 1008-083
- Original air date: May 7, 2012
- Running time: 11 minutes

Guest appearance
- Eric Bauza as Bear

Episode chronology
← Previous "Daddy's Little Monster"	Next → "Hug Wolf"
- Adventure Time season 4

"In Your Footsteps" is the seventh episode of the fourth season of the American animated television series Adventure Time. The episode was written and storyboarded by Tom Herpich and Skyler Page, from a story by Patrick McHale, Kent Osborne, and Pendleton Ward. It originally aired on Cartoon Network on April 30, 2012. The episode guest stars Eric Bauza as a bear and features Ward voicing the Lich-possessed snail.

The series follows the adventures of Finn (voiced by Jeremy Shada), a human boy, and his best friend and adoptive brother Jake (voiced by John DiMaggio), a dog with magical powers to change shape and grow and shrink at will. In this episode, A bear befriends Finn, but Jake thinks he is trying to steal Finn's identity. At the end of the episode, Finn kindly gives the Enchridion to the bear, believing he wishes to learn how to be a hero himself; however, it is revealed that the bear is secretly working for the Lich.

The episode's ending sets up the fourth season finale "The Lich". Other fourth season episodes were supposed to have had similar kinds of hints sprinkled throughout that also set up the season for the finale, although this did not come to pass. The episode received largely positive critical reviews and ranked as the number one telecast in its timeslot among kids aged 2 to 11, and in all boy demographics, according to Nielsen ratings

== Plot ==
While partying with Princess Bubblegum and her subjects in the woods, Finn and Jake meet a friendly bear (voiced by Eric Bauza) who follows them home. The creature begins to copy everything that Finn does; Finn finds the behavior amusing, but Jake finds it creepy. Later that night, Jake discovers the bear, dressed as Finn, copying his mannerisms and sayings; Jake thus concludes that the creature is trying to replace Finn. However, he is unable to prove it to Finn.

The next day, after Finn leaves to take BMO to soccer practice, the bear proceeds to eat Finn’s special “Finn cakes”. Jake decides to set the bear up by filming him eating the cakes. However, upon viewing the footage Finn simply becomes upset at Jake for not stopping the creature. However, both notice a sign, claiming that there will be a party in the forest hosted by Finn. The two rush to the woods to see the bear, clearly disguised as Finn, partying with Bubblegum and the candy people. Finn, finally angered, reproaches the bear, who runs off into the woods, sobbing. Finn, realizing the bear was copying Finn because he idolized him, apologizes to him and gives him the Enchiridion as a way to make amends.

However, the coda of the episode features the bear taking the Enchiridion to the Lich-possessed snail, setting up the events for the fourth season finale, “The Lich”.

== Production ==
"In Your Footsteps" was written and storyboarded by Tom Herpich and Skyler Page, from a story developed by series creator Pendleton Ward, Patrick McHale, and Kent Osborne. This episode marked Herpich and Page's first official board together, as Cole Sanchez had assisted the two in storyboarding "Five Short Graybles" as a way to acclimate Page to the Adventure Time process. According to Herpich, the scene where Jake hears the bear pretending to be Finn in the night is stylistically similar to a scene in the third season episode "Conquest of Cuteness" where Finn and Jake hear a voice in the night. Herpich later noted that he tried to storyboard the scene in "In Your Footsteps" in a way so as to not copy what he had previously done for the show.

The ending of the episode sets up the fourth season finale "The Lich". Herpich noted that there were originally supposed to have been other episodes peppered throughout the season that would have hinted at the finale, but in the end, only the denouement of this episode suggested what was to come. The Lich-possessed Snail was voiced by Ward.

== Reception ==
"In Your Footsteps" aired on Cartoon Network on May 7, 2012. The episode ranked as the number one telecast in its timeslot among kids aged 2 to 11, and in all boy demographics, according to Nielsen ratings. The episode first saw physical release as part of the complete fourth season DVD in October 2014.

Oliver Sava of The A.V. Club awarded the episode a "B−", calling the installment a "breather episode, showing Finn and Jake relaxing before they head off on whatever adventure is waiting for them next." However, he also pointed out that the episode ended on a cliffhanger, something that rarely happened in Adventure Time at the time of its airing. Sava also called the scene wherein the oft-spotted snail speaks "a landmark Adventure Time moment". Ultimately, Sava concluded that "the cliffhanger introduces a slew of intriguing possibilities for Adventure Time, and it would definitely be ambitious for the series to try a serialized story in the midst of the wacky comedy."

Mike Lechevaillier of Slate magazine, in a review of the fourth season, called the episode "charming", and applauded the exploration of Jake's character. He compared the episode favorably to the third season installment "No One Can Hear You" in terms of its focus on "Jake's slippery sanity", and he applauded DiMaggio's voice acting, writing that his "delivery of Jake's panic-stricken sessions is a true testament to the actor's degree of successive theatrical refinement.
