= Bear Island (Antarctica) =

- Location within Antarctica

Geography
- Location: Antarctica
- Coordinates: 68°10′48″S 67°3′36″W

Administration
- Administered under the Antarctic Treaty System

Demographics
- Population: Uninhabited

Bear Island or Isla Teniente González is a rocky island lying 1.9 kilometres (1 nmi) west of Stonington Island in Marguerite Bay, off the coast of Graham Land. Bear Island was presumably known to the British Graham Land Expedition (BGLE) (1934–1937) and the United States Antarctic Service (USAS) Expedition (1939–1941), both based in the Stonington Island area. Bear Island was surveyed in 1947 by the Falkland Islands Dependencies Survey (FIDS), who named it for the USS Bear, flagship of the United States Antarctic Service (USAS) Expedition which visited this area in 1940.

== See also ==
- Composite Antarctic Gazetteer
- List of Antarctic and subantarctic islands
- SCAR
- Territorial claims in Antarctica
