= Barbara Bears =

American ballet dancer

- Born: 1971 (age 53–54); Fort Lauderdale, Florida
- Occupation: Ballet dancer
- Career
- Former groups: Houston Ballet (1988-2009)

Barbara Bears is an American ballet dancer and a former principal dancer with the Houston Ballet in Houston, Texas.

Born in Fort Lauderdale, Florida, Bears joined the Houston Ballet in 1988. At the age of 17, during her first year as a member of the corps de ballet, she was unexpectedly chosen by choreographer Sir Kenneth MacMillan for his ballet Gloria. She was awarded the silver medal at the International Ballet Competition in 1991, and promoted to principal dancer four years later.

In 2001, Bears took a two-year hiatus from performing with the Houston Ballet to teach dance and to choreograph her own ballet, Speaking In Strings, for her company. She returned to dancing after the birth of her son in 2002. Bears retired from the Houston Ballet in 2009.

== Repertoire ==
Her classical repertoire with the Houston Ballet included: Odette/Odile in Swan Lake, Giselle in Giselle, Aurora and Princess Florise in The Sleeping Beauty, Cinderella in Cinderella, the Sylph in La Sylphide, Juliet in Romeo and Juliet, Cleopatra in Cleopatra, the Snow Maiden in The Snow Maiden, the Sugarplum Fairy and the Snow Queen in The Nutcracker, Valencienne and Hanna in The Merry Widow, Solvieg and the Green Lady in Peer Gynt, and the Firebird in The Firebird.

== Personal life ==
Bears is married to Houston restaurateur Garrett Gadbois and has one son. She is a certified scuba diver.
