= Bear Creek =

Bear Creek or Bearcreek may refer to:

== Places ==
=== United States ===
- Bear Creek, Alabama, a town in Marion County
- Bear Creek, Alaska, a census-designated place in Kenai Peninsula Borough
- Bear Creek, California (disambiguation), multiple locations
  - Bear Creek, Merced County, California, a census-designated place
  - Bear Creek, San Joaquin County, California, an unincorporated community
- Bear Creek, Florida, a census-designated place in Pinellas County
- Bearcreek, Missouri, an unincorporated community
- Bearcreek, Montana, a town in Carbon County
- Bear Creek, North Carolina, an unincorporated community in Chatham County
- Bear Creek, Ohio, an unincorporated community
- Bear Creek Village, Pennsylvania, a borough in Luzerne County
  - Bear Creek Village Historic District
- Bear Creek, Texas, a village in Hays County
- Bear Creek, Wisconsin (disambiguation), multiple locations
  - Bear Creek, Outagamie County, Wisconsin, a village
  - Bear Creek, Sauk County, Wisconsin, a town
  - Bear Creek, Waupaca County, Wisconsin, a town
  - Bear Creek Corners, Wisconsin, an unincorporated community
- Bear Creek Township, Sevier County, Arkansas
  - Bear Creek Township, Christian County, Illinois
  - Bear Creek Township, Hancock County, Illinois
- Bearcreek Township, Jay County, Indiana
- Bear Creek Township, Hamilton County, Kansas
- Bear Creek Township, Michigan, a township in Emmet County
- Bear Creek Township, Clearwater County, Minnesota
- Bear Creek Township, Chatham County, North Carolina
- Bear Creek Township, Pennsylvania
  - Bear Creek Wind Power Project

=== Canada ===
- Bear Creek, Saskatchewan, a hamlet
- Bear Creek, Yukon, a locality

== Bodies of water ==
=== United States ===
==== California ====
- Bear Creek (Mokelumne River tributary), a tributary of the Mokelumne River in San Joaquin and Calaveras counties
- Bear Creek (San Francisquito Creek tributary), also known as Bear Gulch Creek, a tributary of San Francisquito Creek in San Mateo County
- Bear Creek (Peters Creek tributary), a tributary of Peters Creek, which is a tributary of Pescadero Creek, San Mateo County
- Bear Creek (Santa Ana River tributary), a tributary of the Santa Ana River
- Bear Creek (Sonoma Creek tributary), a tributary of Sonoma Creek in Sonoma County
- Bear Creek (Contra Costa County), a tributary of San Pablo Creek in Contra Costa County
- Bear Creek (Colusa County), a tributary to Cache Creek within Colusa County draining the Inner Coastal Range. Part of the larger Sacramento River Watershed

==== Georgia ====
- Bear Creek (Kinchafoonee Creek tributary)

==== Iowa ====
- Bear Creek (Des Moines River tributary), a tributary of the Des Moines River in Iowa
- Bear Creek (South Skunk River tributary), a tributary of the South Branch Skunk River in Iowa
- Bear Creek (Yellow River tributary), a tributary of the Yellow River in Iowa

==== Kansas ====
- Bear Creek (Kansas)

==== Michigan ====
- Bear Creek (Michigan), a river

==== Missouri ====
- Bear Creek (Big Creek tributary), a stream in Missouri
- Bear Creek (Big River tributary), a stream in Missouri
- Bear Creek (Blackwater River tributary), a stream in Missouri
- Bear Creek (Bull Creek tributary), a stream in Missouri
- Bear Creek (Castor River tributary), a stream in Missouri
- Bear Creek (Cuivre River tributary), a stream in Missouri
- Bear Creek (Davis Creek tributary), a stream in Missouri
- Bear Creek (Deepwater Creek tributary), a stream in Missouri
- Bear Creek (Fabius River tributary), a stream in Missouri
- Bear Creek (Gasconade River tributary), a stream in Missouri
- Bear Creek (Heads Creek tributary), a stream in Missouri
- Bear Creek (Loutre River tributary), a stream in Missouri
- Bear Creek (Middle Fork Grand River tributary), a stream in Missouri
- Bear Creek (Mississippi River tributary), a stream in Missouri
- Bear Creek (Missouri River tributary), a stream in Missouri
- Bear Creek (North Fork Salt River tributary), a stream in Missouri
- Bear Creek (Osage River tributary), a stream in Missouri
- Bear Creek (Rocky Fork Creek tributary), a stream in Missouri
- Bear Creek (Sac River tributary), a stream in southwest Missouri
- Bear Creek (Terre Bleue Creek tributary), a stream in Missouri

==== Montana ====
- Bear Creek (Middle Fork Flathead River)

==== New York ====
- Bear Creek (Middle Branch Grass River)

==== North Carolina ====
- Bear Creek (Rocky River tributary), a stream in Chatham County
- Bear Creek (Deep River tributary), a stream in Moore and Randolph counties
- Bear Creek (Neuse River), a tributary of the Neuse River
- Bear Creek (Fisher River tributary), a stream in Surry County

==== Oregon ====
- Bear Creek (Oregon), several streams of that name
- Bear Creek (Lincoln County, Oregon), a tributary of the coastal Salmon River
- Bear Creek (Rogue River), a tributary of the Rogue River

==== Pennsylvania ====
- Bear Creek (Allegheny River tributary), a tributary of the Allegheny River
- Bear Creek (Lehigh River tributary), a tributary of the Lehigh River
- Bear Creek (Loyalsock Creek tributary), a tributary of Loyalsock Creek

==== Wisconsin ====
- Bear Creek (Little Eau Pleine River tributary), a stream in Wisconsin
- Bear Creek (Mill Creek tributary), a stream in Wisconsin
- Bear Creek (Wisconsin River), a stream in Wisconsin

==== Elsewhere ====
- Bear Creek (Tennessee River tributary), in Alabama and Mississippi
- Bear Creek (Colorado), a tributary that joins the South Platte River near Denver
- Bear Creek (Red Bird River tributary), a stream in Kentucky
- Bear Creek (Zumbro River), a stream in Minnesota
- Bear Creek (Upper Iowa River tributary), in Iowa and Minnesota
- Bear Creek (New Jersey), a tributary of the Pequest River
- Bear Creek Reservoir, in Alabama
- Bear Creek (Washington), a tributary of the Sammamish River in Washington

=== Canada ===
- Bear Creek (Tahltan River), a tributary of the Tahltan River on Level Mountain in northwest British Columbia
- Lambly Creek, also known as Bear Creek, in British Columbia

== Schools ==
=== Canada ===
- Bear Creek Elementary School, British Columbia
- Bear Creek Secondary School, Ontario

=== United States ===
- Bear Creek High School (California)
- Bear Creek High School (Colorado)
- The Bear Creek School, Washington

== Churches ==
- Bear Creek Baptist Church, Kirksville, Missouri
- Bear Creek Cumberland Presbyterian Church, Mooresville, Tennessee

== Music ==
- Bear Creek (album), 2012, by Brandi Carlile
- Bear Creek Guitars, guitar manufacturer
- Bear Creek Studio, recording studio in Woodinville, Washington

== Recreation areas ==
- Bear Creek Provincial Park, British Columbia
- Bear Creek Cañon Park, Colorado Springs, Colorado
- Bear Creek Regional Park and Nature Center, Colorado Springs, Colorado
- Bear Creek Lake State Park, Cumberland, Virginia
- Bear Creek Pioneers Park, Houston, Texas
- Bear Creek Mountain Resort, Macungie, Pennsylvania

== Other uses ==
- Bear Creek (meteorite), found in 1866 in Jefferson County, Colorado, US

== See also ==
- Bear Branch (disambiguation)
- Bear Brook (disambiguation)
- Bear River (disambiguation)
- Bear Lake (disambiguation)
