= Bear Branch =

Bear Branch may refer to:

== Inhabited places in the United States ==
- Bear Branch, Indiana, an unincorporated community in Ohio County
- Bear Branch, Kentucky, a branch of Big Creek river in Leslie County
- Bear Branch, Missouri, an unincorporated community

== Bodies of water in the United States ==
- Bear Branch (Bear Creek tributary), a stream in Missouri
- Bear Branch (Black River tributary), a stream in Missouri
- Bear Branch (Burris Fork tributary), a stream in Missouri
- Bear Branch (South Fork Blackwater River tributary), a stream in Missouri
- Bear Branch (Spencer Creek tributary), a stream in Missouri

== Other uses ==
- Bear Branch Nature Center, in Carroll County, Maryland, United States

== See also ==
- Bear Creek (disambiguation)
