= Bear Lake =

Bear Lake may refer to several places:

== Lakes ==
=== Canada ===
- Bear Lake (Bear River), a lake in the northwestern Omineca Country of the North-Central Interior of British Columbia, part of the Skeena River drainage via the Bear and Sustut Rivers (there are six other Bear Lakes in British Columbia)
- Great Bear Lake, eighth largest lake in the world, largest in Northwest Territories
- Bear Lake (Ontario), one of 29 Bear Lakes in Ontario
- Bear Lake (Halifax Regional Municipality, Nova Scotia), one of 16 lakes in Nova Scotia
- Bear Lake (Colchester County, Nova Scotia)

=== United States ===
- Bear Lake (Alaska), a lake near the town of Seward and Resurrection Bay
- Bear Lake (Colorado), in Rocky Mountain National Park
- Bear Lake (Idaho), an alpine lake in Custer County
- Bear Lake (Idaho–Utah), along the Idaho–Utah border, first called Black Bear Lake
- Bear Lake (Michigan), a lake in Kalkaska County
- Bear Lake (Muskegon County, Michigan), which abuts Muskegon, Michigan
- Bear Lake in Beaverhead County, Montana
- Bear Lake in Lincoln County, Montana
- Bear Lake in Powell County, Montana
- Bear Lake in Sanders County, Montana
- Bear Lake (Chautauqua County, New York), a lake north of Kelly Corners, New York
- Bear Lake (Herkimer County, New York), a lake near McKeever, New York
- Bear Lake (Oregon), there are at least 8 Bear Lakes in Oregon
- Bear Lake (Washington), a lake in King County
- Big Bear Lake, a reservoir in San Bernardino County, California
- Little Bear Lake, a lake in McLeod County, Minnesota

=== Romania ===
- Bear Lake (Romania) (Lacul Ursu), a lake in Sovata

== Counties, cities, towns, townships, parks ==
=== Canada ===
- Bear Lake, British Columbia, a settlement to the north of the city of Prince George, British Columbia
- Bear Lake (Fort Connelly), a settlement on the lake of the same name, north of Fort Babine, British Columbia
- Bear Lake 4, an Indian Reserve in British Columbia, on the lake of the same name north of Fort Babine
- Bear Lake, Ontario
- Bear Lake, Alberta, a settlement on the northeastern shore of Bear Lake

=== United States ===
- Bear Lake County, Idaho
- Bear Lake State Park (Idaho)
- Bear Lake State Park (Utah)
- Bear Lake, Kalkaska County, Michigan
- Bear Lake Township, Kalkaska County, Michigan
- Bear Lake Township, Manistee County, Michigan
- Bear Lake, Michigan, a village in Manistee County
- Bear Lake, Indiana, a lakeside community
- Bear Lake, Pennsylvania, a borough in Warren County
- Bear Lake, Rusk County, Wisconsin, an unincorporated community
- Bear Lake, Wisconsin, a town
- Big Bear Lake, California, a city in San Bernardino County
- White Bear Lake Township, Pope County, Minnesota
- White Bear Lake, Minnesota, a city in Ramsey County

== See also ==
- White Bear Lake (disambiguation)
- Bear River (disambiguation)
- Bear Creek (disambiguation)
- Bear Brook (disambiguation)
