= Bear Creek, California =

Bear Creek, California may refer to:

Communities

- Bear Creek, Merced County, California
- Bear Creek, San Joaquin County, California

Creeks

- Bear Creek (Colusa County), a tributary of Cache Creek and ultimately the Sacramento River in the Inner Coastal Ranges
- Bear Creek (Contra Costa County), a tributary of San Pablo Creek
- Bear Creek (Santa Ana River tributary), San Bernardino Mountains, San Bernardino County, California
- Bear Creek (San Francisquito Creek tributary), San Mateo County, California
