= Bear Creek, Wisconsin =

Bear Creek is the name of some places in the U.S. state of Wisconsin:

- Bear Creek, Outagamie County, Wisconsin, a village
- Bear Creek, Sauk County, Wisconsin, a township
- Bear Creek, Waupaca County, Wisconsin, a town
  - Bear Creek Corners, Wisconsin, an unincorporated community
