= Bear Brook =

Bear Brook may refer to:

== Streams ==
Canada

- Bear Brook (Ontario)

Englans

- Bear Brook, tributary to the River Thame

United States

- Bear Brook (Suncook River tributary), New Hampshire
- Bear Brook (Pascack Brook tributary), New Jersey
- Bear Brook (Millstone River tributary), New Jersey
- Bear Brook (Baxter Brook tributary), New York
- Bear Brook (Sands Creek tributary), New York
- Bear Brook (Roaring Brook tributary), Pennsylvania

== Other uses ==
- Bear Brook, Newfoundland and Labrador, a former community in Canada
- Bear Brook State Park, New Hampshire
- Bear Brook murders, four murder victims discovered in Bear Brook State Park
- Bear Brook (podcast), a podcast about the Bear Brook murders

== See also ==
- Bear Creek (disambiguation)
- Bear River (disambiguation)
- Bear Lake (disambiguation)
