= Bearlake =

Bearlake may refer to:

- an Intel mainboard chipset series
- a language from Northwestern Canada
- a subarctic tribe

== See also ==
- Bear Lake (disambiguation)
