= Lambly Creek =

Stream in British Columbia, Canada

Coordinates: 49°56′N 119°30′W

Lambly Creek, also known as Bear Creek, is located in the Okanagan region of British Columbia. The creek flows into Okanagan Lake from the west, across from Kelowna. The canyon and mouth of the creek are protected by Bear Creek Provincial Park.

Named Bear Creek in 1833 by botanist David Douglas, the stream was officially renamed Lambly Creek in 1922, after Charles Anderson Richardson Lambly (d. 1907), who had been a government agent in several towns in the BC interior.

Gold was discovered in the creek in 1876, and the creek was subsequently mined. Gold nuggets valued at $5 were reported to have been recovered from the creek as late as 1973.
