= Loreta, Wisconsin =

Loreto, Wisconsin
- Unincorporated community
- Location within Wisconsin Location within the United States
- Coordinates: 43°20′44″N 90°06′26″W
- Country: United States
- State: Wisconsin
- County: Sauk
- Elevation: 1,165 ft (355 m)
- Time zone: UTC-6 (Central (CST))
  - Summer (DST): UTC-5 (CDT)
- Area code: 608
- GNIS feature ID: 1577708

Loreto is an unincorporated community in the town of Bear Creek, Sauk County, Wisconsin, United States. The community center was once located on Highway G in Town 10N Range3E in Section 14 with a public school in Joint District 9, a cheese factory, tavern, store and post office. The village name is sometimes spelled "Loretto" or "Loreta." The school closed in 1962 and the businesses no longer exist. Remaining is the Catholic parish of St. Patrick's with a brick church and rectory and parish cemetery. It was named after Loreto, Italy in 1900 by Rev. Felix Andrew Byrne, the postmaster at Loreto and pastor of St. Patrick Catholic Church.
