= Bear Lake, Kalkaska County, Michigan =

Bear Lake, Michigan
- Census-designated place (CDP) & unincorporated community
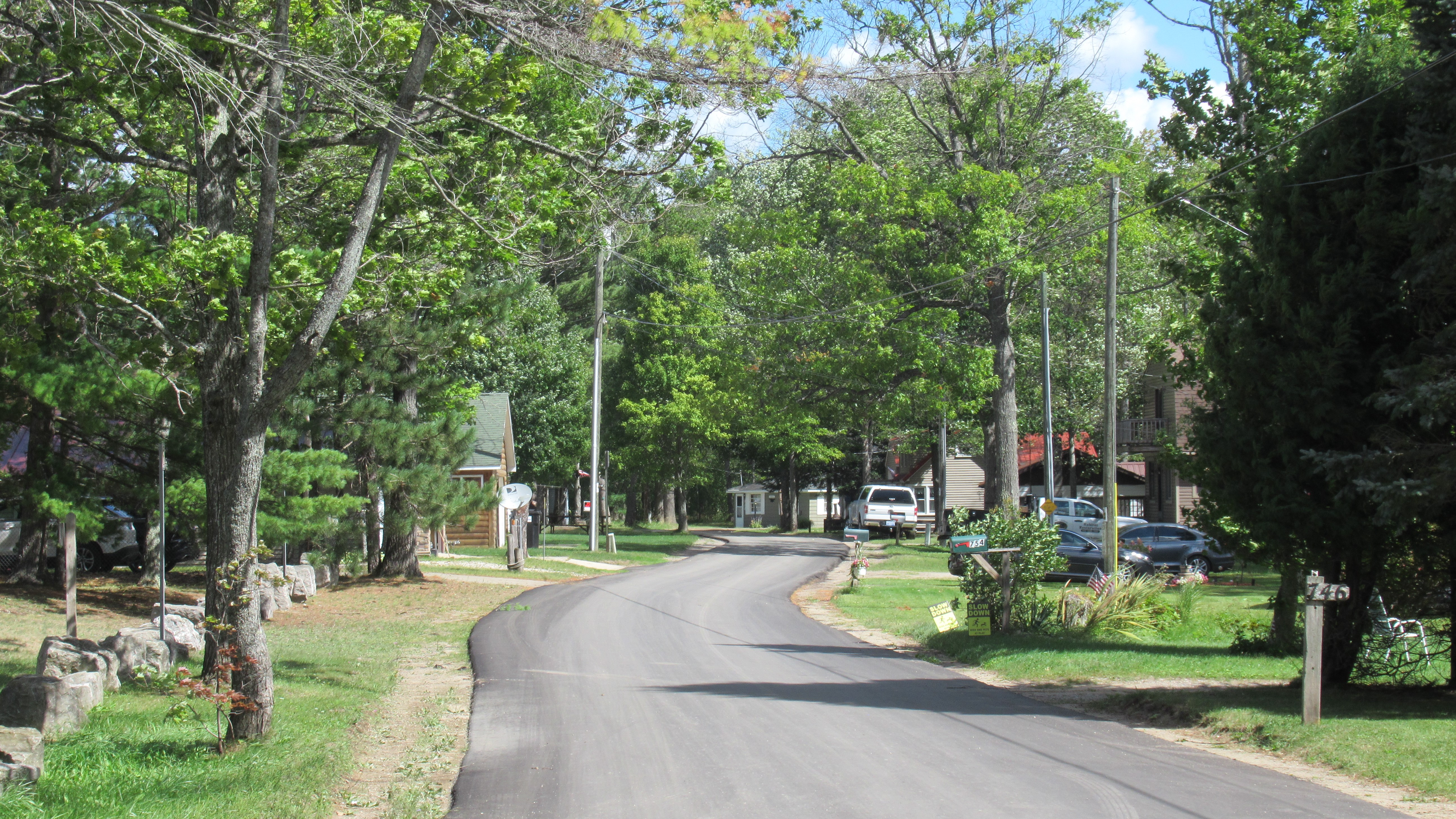
- Looking north along E. Bear Lake Road

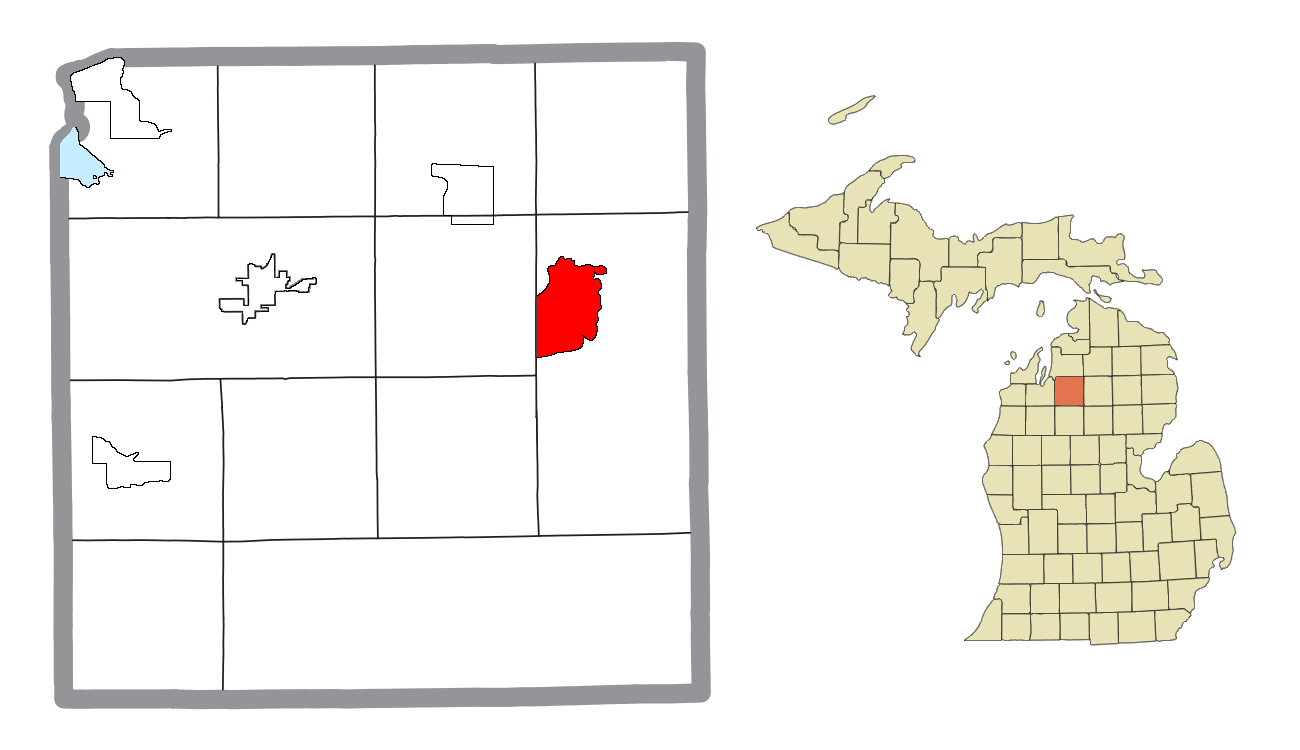
- Location within Kalkaska County

- Location within the state of Michigan Bear Lake (the United States)
- Coordinates: 44°43′06″N 84°56′55″W
- Country: United States
- State: Michigan
- County: Kalkaska
- Township: Bear Lake

Area
  - Total: 6.40 sq mi (16.57 km^{2})
  - Land: 5.76 sq mi (14.92 km^{2})
  - Water: 0.63 sq mi (1.64 km^{2})
- Elevation: 1,217 ft (371 m)

Population (2020)
  - Total: 366
  - Density: 63.5/sq mi (24.53/km^{2})
- Time zone: UTC-5 (Eastern (EST))
  - Summer (DST): UTC-4 (EDT)
- ZIP code(s): 49646 (Kalkaska)
- Area code: 231
- FIPS code: 26-06430
- GNIS feature ID: 2583720

Bear Lake is an unincorporated community and census-designated place (CDP) in Kalkaska County in the U.S. state of Michigan. At the 2020 census, the CDP had a population of 366. Bear Lake is located within Bear Lake Township.

== History ==
The community of Bear Lake was listed as a newly-organized census-designated place for the 2010 census, meaning it now has officially defined boundaries and population statistics for the first time. The CDP is organized for statistical purposes only and has no legal status as an incorporated municipality.

== Geography ==
According to the United States Census Bureau, the Bear Lake CDP has an area of 6.42 square miles (16.63 km^{2}), of which 5.76 square miles (14.92 km^{2}) is land and 0.66 square miles (1.71 km^{2}) (10.28%) is water.

The community is located in the northwest portion of Bear Lake Township in Kalkaska County. The community's namesake is Bear Lake, and other lakes include the smaller Cub Lake, Mallard Lake, Upper Black Lake, and South Black Lake. M-72 runs east–west through the southern portion of the CDP and connects to Grayling to the east and Kalkaska to the west.

== Demographics ==
Historical population
Census	Pop.	Note	%±
2020	366		—
U.S. Decennial Census
