= Bear Creek Guitars =

- Company type: Private
- Industry: Musical instruments
- Headquarters: California
- Area served: Global
- Key people: Bill Hardin
- Products: Custom Weissenborn-style Hawaiian lap steel guitars
- Website: Bear Creek Guitars

Bear Creek Guitars is a California-based manufacturer of Hawaiian instruments. Luthier Bill Hardin founded the company in Hawaii in 1995 after working at O.M.I Dobro and the Santa Cruz Guitar Company. Bear Creek primarily builds acoustic lap steel guitars in the tradition of the Weissenborn, one of only a handful of manufacturers basing their instruments on the original Weissenborn design. Hardin has collaborated with guitarist and ethnomusicologist Bob Brozman in designing an updated 7-string baritone version of the Style IV Weissenborn, called the BearTone.

== History ==
Bill Hardin was introduced to the Weissenborn by Don Young of National Reso-Phonic Guitars while they both worked for Dobro. One day Don brought in a Weissenborn copy and Bill was impressed with its sound. "It was such a pure slide sound and just amazing," he recalled in a 2007 Fretboard Journal feature article.

== Instruments ==
Bear Creek builds both hollowneck and Kona roundneck copies of the Weissenborn, as well as Spanish steel-stings, ukuleles, and resonators. The BearTone can be heard on Bob Brozman's Nankuru Naisa, his second collaboration with Takashi Hirayasu (their first collaboration, Jin Jin, features Brozman on a Bear Creek "Kona Rocket.")
