= White Bear =

White bear may refer to:

== Animals ==
- Polar bear, also known as a white bear
- Kermode bear, or spirit bear, a subspecies of American black bear in British Columbia, Canada
- White bear of Henry III, an individual bear of the medieval period

== Buildings ==
- The White Bear, Clerkenwell, a public house in London
- White Bear railway station, a former train station in Adlington, Lancashire, England

== People ==
- Satanta (Kiowa leader) (ca. 1820–1878), or White Bear, great chief of the Kiowa tribe
- White Bear (Wabimakwa) (died 1870), Chief of Temagami First Nation, Ontario

== Places ==
=== Canada ===
- White Bear, Saskatchewan, a hamlet in Saskatchewan, Canada
- White Bear 70, an Indian Reserve in Saskatchewan

=== United States ===
- White Bear Township, Minnesota, in Ramsey County
- White Bear, Missouri, an unincorporated community

== Other uses ==
- White Bear (album), by the Temperance Movement, or the title song, 2016
- "White Bear" (Black Mirror), a 2013 television episode
- Night of the White Bear, 1971 Canadian novel by Alexander Knox

== See also ==
- White Bear Lake (disambiguation)
