= Bear Branch, Missouri =

Unincorporated community in Missouri, U.S.

Coordinates: 39°56′29″N 93°02′02″W

Bear Branch is an unincorporated community in north central Linn County, in the U.S. state of Missouri.

The community is on Missouri Route V approximately seven miles east of Purdin.

== History ==
A post office called Bear Branch was established in 1871, and remained in operation until 1887. The community took its name from nearby Bear Branch creek.
