= White Bear Lake =

White Bear Lake may refer to:

== Canada ==
- White Bear (Carlyle) Lake, a lake in Saskatchewan

== United States ==
- White Bear Lake (Minnesota), a lake in Ramsey and Washington counties in Minnesota
- White Bear Lake, Minnesota, a city in Ramsey County
  - White Bear Lake Area High School
- White Bear Lake Township, Pope County, Minnesota

== See also ==
- White Bear (disambiguation)
- Bear Lake (disambiguation)
