= Bear Creek (Mill Creek tributary) =

Stream in Wisconsin, U.S.

Coordinates: 44°29′36″N 89°39′12″W

Bear Creek is a stream in the U.S. state of Wisconsin. It is a tributary to Mill Creek.

Bear Creek was so named on account of bears near its course.
