= Bear River =

Bear River may mean:

== Populated places ==
- Bear River, Minnesota
- Bear River City, Utah
- Bear River City, Wyoming
- Bear River, Wyoming
- Bear River, Nova Scotia
- Bear River, Prince Edward Island

== Rivers ==
=== Canada ===
==== Alberta ====
- Bear River (Alberta), a tributary of the Wapiti River

==== British Columbia ====
- Bear River (British Columbia), a river in British Columbia, entering the head of the Portland Canal at the community of Stewart
- Bear River (Sustut River), a river in the northwestern Omineca Country of the British Columbia Interior, tributary to the Skeena River via the Sustut River
- Bedwell River, once officially, and still commonly, known as Bear River, in the Clayoquot Sound area of Vancouver Island, British Columbia

==== Nova Scotia ====
- Bear River (Nova Scotia)

==== Ontario ====
- Bear River (Ontario), a river in the Timiskaming District of Ontario

=== United States ===
==== California ====
- Bear River (Mokelumne River tributary)
- Bear River (Feather River tributary)
- Bear River (Humboldt County)

==== Colorado ====
- Bear River (Colorado)

==== Georgia ====
- Bear River (Georgia)

==== Maine ====
- Bear River (Androscoggin River)
- Bear River (Long Lake)

==== Massachusetts ====
- Bear River (Massachusetts), a river in Massachusetts

==== Michigan ====
- Bear River (Michigan)

==== Minnesota ====
- Bear River (Big Fork River)
- Bear River (Leech Lake River)
- Bear River (Sturgeon River)

==== Utah ====
- Bear River (Great Salt Lake), a river in Utah, Wyoming, and Idaho that empties into the Great Salt Lake

==== Washington ====
- Bear River (Washington)

==== Wisconsin ====
- Bear River (Wisconsin), a river in Wisconsin

== Other ==
- Bear River (tribe), a Native American group in California, United States
- Bear River First Nation, a government of the indigenous Mi'kmaq people located in Bear River, Nova Scotia, Canada
- Bear River Massacre, an 1863 massacre of Shoshone by the United States Army in Idaho, United States
- Bear River Glacier, the official name of the glacier enshrined in Bear Glacier Provincial Park near Stewart, British Columbia, Canada
- Bear River High School, a public high school in Grass Valley, California, United States
- Bear River Pass, a pass to the north of Stewart, British Columbia, Canada, at the divide between the basins of the Bear and Meziadin Rivers
- Bear River Range, a mountain range located in northeastern Utah and southeastern Idaho

== See also ==
- Bear Lake (disambiguation)
- Bear Brook (disambiguation)
- Bear Creek (disambiguation)
