= Bear Creek (Davis Creek tributary) =

Stream in Missouri, U.S.

Coordinates: 39°01′27″N 93°41′19″W

Bear Creek is a stream in Lafayette County in the U.S. state of Missouri. It is a tributary of Davis Creek. The confluence is approximately 3/4 mile northwest of the community of Aullville.

Bear Creek most likely has the name of John Bear, a pioneer citizen.

== See also ==
- List of rivers of Missouri
