= Bear Creek (Little Eau Pleine River tributary) =

Stream in Wisconsin, U.S.

Coordinates: 44°42′27″N 89°52′30″W

Bear Creek is a stream in the U.S. state of Wisconsin. It is a tributary to the Little Eau Pleine River.

Bear Creek was so named on account of bears near its course.
