= Bear Creek (Osage River tributary) =

Stream in Missouri, U.S.

Coordinates: 38°11′33″N 92°30′58″W

Bear Creek is a stream in Miller County in the U.S. state of Missouri. It is a tributary of the Osage River.

The stream headwaters arise on the north side of a ridge about two miles north of Brumley (at) at an elevation of about 840 ft (260 m). The stream flows northwest to north passing the old community of Blackmer to its confluence with the Osage adjacent to Wolf Creek (at ) at an elevation of 554 ft (169 m).

Bear Creek was so named due to frequent sightings of bears near its course.

== See also ==
- List of rivers of Missouri
