= Bear Lake (Halifax Regional Municipality, Nova Scotia) =

Lake of Halifax Regional Municipality, Nova Scotia, Canada

Bear Lake (Nova Scotia)
- Location within Nova Scotia
- Location: Halifax Regional Municipality, Nova Scotia
- Coordinates: 44.946°N 62.8121°W
- Basin countries: Canada

Bear Lake (Nova Scotia) is a lake of Halifax Regional Municipality, Nova Scotia, Canada.

== See also ==
- List of lakes in Nova Scotia
