= Bear Creek (Kinchafoonee Creek tributary) =

Physical characteristics
- Source
  - coordinates: 32.0862677°N 84.6585312°W
- Mouth
  - coordinates: 31.9082205°N 84.3807468°W

Bear Creek is a stream in the U.S. state of Georgia. It is a tributary to Kinchafoonee Creek. A variant name is "Lochochee Creek".

The name Bear Creek is an accurate preservation of the native Creek-language name Nokosi Hachi, meaning "bear creek".
