= Bear Lake (Chautauqua County, New York) =

Lake in New York, United States

- Location within New York Location within the United States
- Location: Chautauqua County, New York, United States
- Coordinates: 42°20′49″N 79°23′01″W
- Basin countries: United States
- Surface area: 116 acres (0.47 km^{2})
- Average depth: 10 feet (3.0 m)
- Max. depth: 35 feet (11 m)
- Shore length^{1}: 2.5 miles (4.0 km)
- Surface elevation: 1,316 feet (401 m)
- Settlements: Kelly Corners, New York
- ^{1} Shore length is not a well-defined measure.

Bear Lake is located north of Kelly Corners, New York. Fish species present in the lake are largemouth bass, northern pike, smallmouth bass, pumpkinseed sunfish, bluegill, tiger muskie, muskellunge, walleye, yellow perch, and black bullhead. There is a state owned hand launch located on the east shore off Bear Lake Road.
