= Bear Creek (Big Creek tributary) =

Stream in Missouri, U.S.

Bear Creek is a stream in Henry and Johnson counties of west central Missouri. It is a tributary of Big Creek.

The stream headwaters are situated at 38°41′55″N 93°59′34″W and the confluence with Big Creek is at 38°33′54″N 93°58′22″W.

Bear Creek was so named on account of bears in the area.

== See also ==
- List of rivers of Missouri
