= Bear Creek (Heads Creek tributary) =

Stream in Missouri, U.S.

Coordinates: 38.410332°N 90.5717917°W

Bear Creek is a stream in Jefferson County in the U.S. state of Missouri. It is a tributary of Heads Creek.

Bear Creek was named for bears along its course.

== See also ==
- List of rivers of Missouri
