= Bear Creek (South Skunk River tributary) =

Stream in Iowa

Coordinates: 42°06′45″N 93°33′47″W

Bear Creek is a stream in Hamilton and Story counties, Iowa, in the United States. It is a tributary of the South Branch Skunk River.

According to tradition, Bear Creek received its name from a pioneer incident when a man shot a black bear near its course.
