= Bear Creek (Michigan) =

Location
- Country: United States
- State: Michigan

Physical characteristics
- Source
  - location: Confluence of First Creek and Second Creek near Copemish, Michigan
  - coordinates: 44°28′4″N 85°56′24″W
- Mouth
  - location: Manistee River near Brethren, Michigan
  - coordinates: 44°17′32″N 86°6′54″W
- Length: 28 mi (45 km)

National Wild and Scenic Rivers System
- Type: Scenic
- Designated: March 3, 1992

Bear Creek is a 28-mile-long (45 km) river in the U.S. state of Michigan. The river drains much of central Manistee County, and is part of the Manistee River watershed.
