= Bear Lake (Colchester County, Nova Scotia) =

Lake in Colchester County, Nova Scotia, Canada

Bear Lake, Nova Scotia
- Location within Nova Scotia
- Location: Colchester County, Nova Scotia
- Coordinates: 45°33′24″N 63°30′19″W
- Basin countries: Canada

Bear Lake, Nova Scotia is a lake of Colchester County, in Nova Scotia, Canada.

== See also ==
- List of lakes in Nova Scotia
