= Bear Branch (South Fork Blackwater River tributary) =

Stream in Missouri, U.S.

Coordinates: 38°53′23″N 93°25′35″W

Bear Branch is a stream in Pettis County in the U.S. state of Missouri. It is a tributary of the South Fork Blackwater River.

Bear Branch was so named on account of bears in the area.

== See also ==
- List of rivers of Missouri
