= Bear Creek (Zumbro River tributary) =

Stream in Olmsted County, Minnesota, U.S.

Coordinates: 44°01′14″N 92°27′23″W

Bear Creek is a stream in Olmsted County, in the U.S. state of Minnesota. It is a tributary of the Zumbro River.

Bear Creek was named after Benjamin Bear, a pioneer settler.

== See also ==
- List of rivers of Minnesota
