= Bear Creek (Rocky Fork Creek tributary) =

Stream in Missouri, U.S.

- Location within Missouri

Location
- Country: United States
- State: Missouri

Physical characteristics
- Source
  - coordinates: 39°02′36″N 92°16′13″W
- Mouth
  - coordinates: 38°59′39″N 92°22′42″W
  - elevation: 587 feet

Bear Creek is a stream in Boone County in the U.S. state of Missouri. It is a tributary of Rocky Fork Creek. Bear Creek is approximately 6 miles long.

According to tradition, Bear Creek was named for an incident when a bear entered a pioneer family's cabin near the creek.

== See also ==
- List of rivers of Missouri
