= Bear Lake Township, Kalkaska County, Michigan =

Bear Lake Township, Michigan
- Civil township
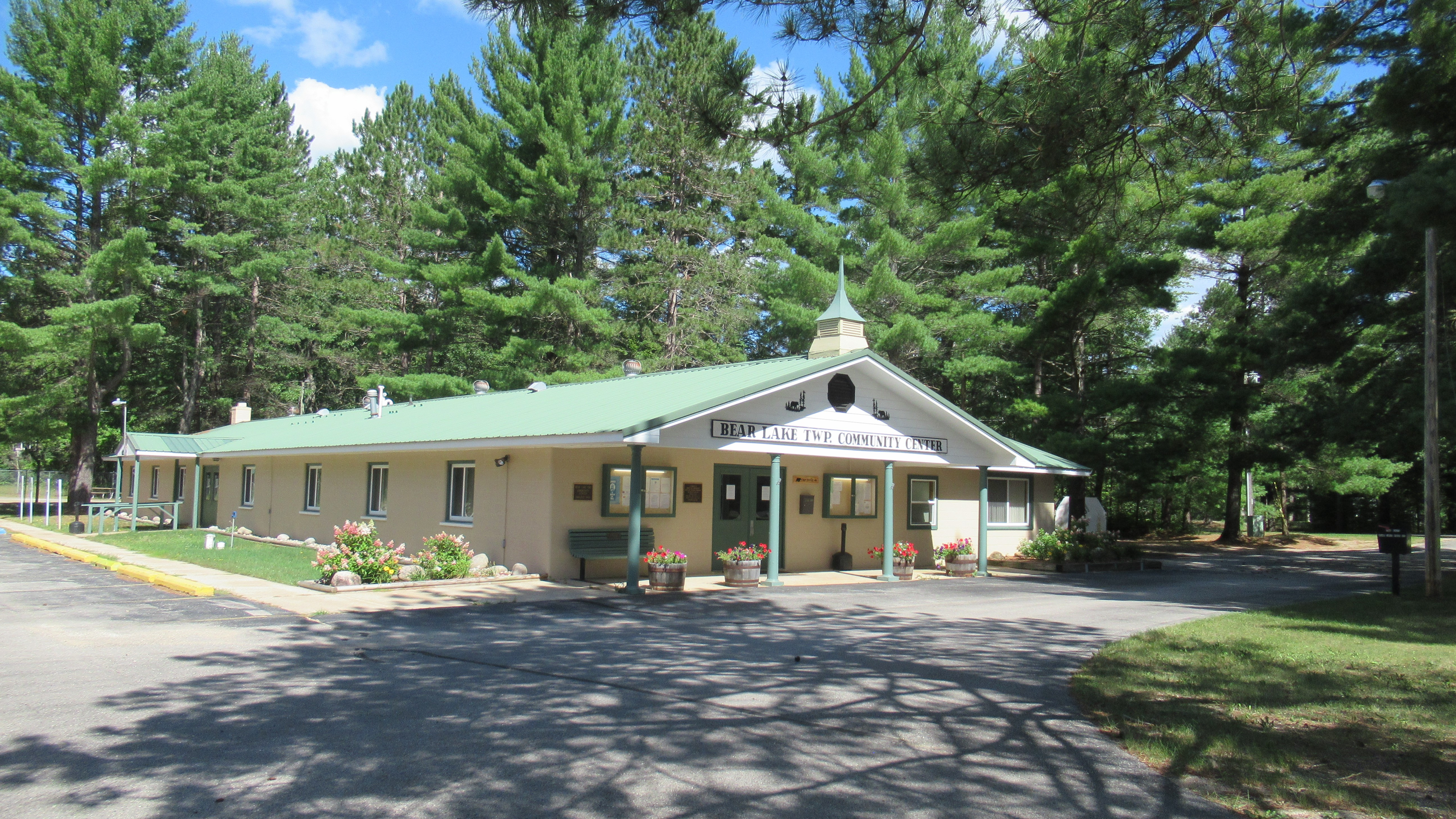
- Bear Lake Township Community Center

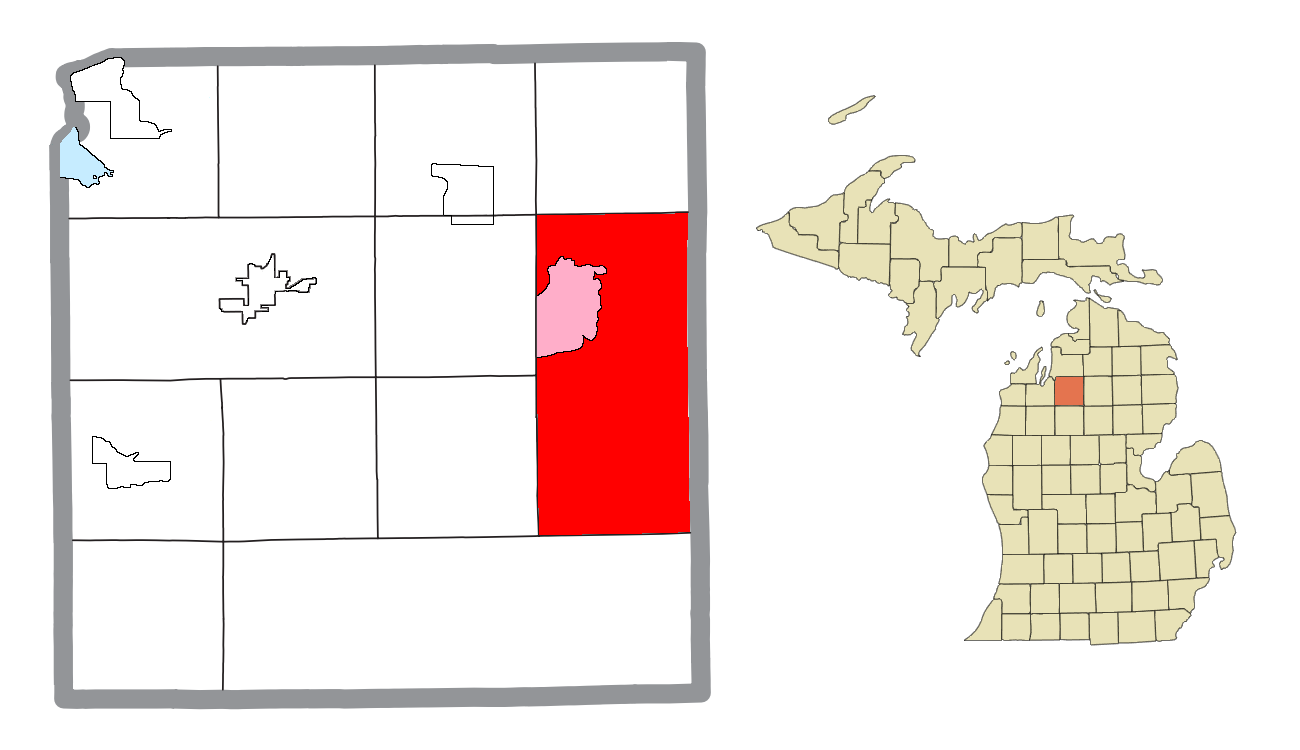
- Location within Kalkaska County (red) and the administered community of Bear Lake (pink)

- Location within the state of Michigan Bear Lake Township (the United States)
- Coordinates: 44°41′20″N 84°54′21″W
- Country: United States
- State: Michigan
- County: Kalkaska

Government
  - Supervisor: George Banker
  - Clerk: Delanna David

Area
  - Total: 72.32 sq mi (187.3 km^{2})
  - Land: 71.09 sq mi (184.1 km^{2})
  - Water: 1.23 sq mi (3.2 km^{2})
- Elevation: 1,217 ft (371 m)

Population (2020)
  - Total: 668
  - Density: 9.38/sq mi (3.62/km^{2})
- Time zone: UTC-5 (Eastern (EST))
  - Summer (DST): UTC-4 (EDT)
- ZIP code(s): 49633 (Fife Lake); 49646 (Kalkaska); 49738 (Grayling)
- Area code: 231
- FIPS code: 26-06440
- GNIS feature ID: 1625897
- Website: Official website

Bear Lake Township is a civil township of Kalkaska County in the U.S. state of Michigan. As of the 2020 census, the township population was 668.

== Geography ==
According to the United States Census Bureau, the township has a total area of 72.32 square miles (187.31 km^{2}), of which 71.09 square miles (184.12 km^{2}) is land and 1.23 square miles (3.19 km^{2}) (1.70%) is water.

The township contains several lakes, including Bear Lake, Cub Lake, Upper Black Lake, Middle Black Lake, South Black Lake, Mallard Lake, Kings Ponds, Johnson Lake, East Lakes, and Cranberry Lake. The Manistee River, Black Creek, Clear Creek, and Portage Creek also run through the township.

The township is approximately halfway between the city of Grayling to the east and the village of Kalkaska to the west. M-72 passes east–west through the center of the township. Bear Lake is an unincorporated community and census-designated place within the northwest portion of the township.

== Demographics ==
As of the census of 2000, there were 746 people, 340 households, and 227 families residing in the township. The population density was 10.4 inhabitants per square mile (4.0/km^{2}). There were 1,072 housing units at an average density of 15.0 per square mile (5.8/km^{2}). The racial makeup of the township was 97.45% White, 0.13% African American, 0.27% Native American, 0.13% Asian, 0.27% Pacific Islander, and 1.74% from two or more races. Hispanic or Latino of any race were 0.27% of the population.

There were 340 households, out of which 18.5% had children under the age of 18 living with them, 58.8% were married couples living together, 4.4% had a female householder with no husband present, and 33.2% were non-families. 25.9% of all households were made up of individuals, and 11.5% had someone living alone who was 65 years of age or older. The average household size was 2.19 and the average family size was 2.60.

In the township the population was spread out, with 17.0% under the age of 18, 5.0% from 18 to 24, 24.0% from 25 to 44, 31.8% from 45 to 64, and 22.3% who were 65 years of age or older. The median age was 48 years. For every 100 females, there were 101.1 males. For every 100 females age 18 and over, there were 101.6 males.

The median income for a household in the township was $36,875, and the median income for a family was $38,289. Males had a median income of $29,821 versus $21,339 for females. The per capita income for the township was $17,570. About 8.1% of families and 8.9% of the population were below the poverty line, including 11.9% of those under age 18 and 6.4% of those age 65 or over.
