= Bear Lake (Ontario) =

Bear Lake may refer to one of 29 lakes of that name in Ontario, Canada:

- Bear Lake, Algoma District 49.317976°N 84.783826°W
- Bear Lake, Algoma District 46.46451°N 82.40515°W
- Bear Lake, Cochrane District 49.206389°N 81.287500°W
- Bear Lake, Frontenac County 44.496507°N 76.499195°W
- Bear Lake, Frontenac County 44.561863°N 76.485485°W
- Bear Lake, Frontenac County 45.03531°N 76.97818°W
- Bear Lake, Haliburton County 45.341273°N 78.709459°W
- Bear Lake, Hastings County 44.898611°N 77.793889°W
- Bear Lake, Kenora District 49.93639°N 94.73347°W
- Bear Lake, Kenora District 49.70101°N 91.42726°W
- Bear Lake, Kenora District 49.871389°N 94.261389°W
- Bear Lake, Lennox and Addington County 44.602766°N 76.925723°W
- Bear Lake, Manitoulin District 46.01394°N 81.89985°W
- Bear Lake, District Municipality of Muskoka 44.961891°N 79.773648°W
- Bear Lake, Muskoka District 45.00099°N 79.58852°W
- Bear Lake, Nipissing District 46.331403°N 80.255955°W
- Bear Lake, Nipissing District 45.62984°N 78.77342°W
- Bear Lake, Nipissing District 46.630278°N 79.602778°W
- Bear Lake, Parry Sound District 45.533021°N 80.164645°W
- Bear Lake, Parry Sound District 45.686564°N 80.090401°W
- Bear Lake, Parry Sound District 45.44211°N 79.586481°W
- Bear Lake, Renfrew County 45.6218°N 77.64692°W
- Bear Lake, Renfrew County and Nipissing District45.518889°N 77.900556°W
- Bear Lake, Sudbury District 46.156667°N 80.399444°W
- Bear Lake, Sudbury District 47.554561°N 82.068911°W
- Bear Lake, Sudbury District 46.18922°N 81.45039°W
- Bear Lake, Sudbury District 47.32895°N 82.21401°W
- Bear Lake, Thunder Bay District 48.552578°N 85.411432°W
- Bear Lake, Timiskaming District 48.131607°N 79.631474°W
