= Bear Creek (Cuivre River tributary) =

Stream in Missouri, U.S.

Bear Creek is a stream in Montgomery and Lincoln counties of Missouri. It is a tributary of the West Fork of the Cuivre River.

The stream headwaters in Montgomery County are at 38°52′24″N 91°21′41″W and the confluence with the West Fork of the Cuivre in Lincoln County is at 39°02′14″N 91°13′39″W.

Bear Creek was named for the fact pioneers encountered bears there.

== See also ==
- List of rivers of Missouri
