= Bear Creek (Blackwater River tributary) =

Stream in Missouri, U.S.

Coordinates: 38.815568°N 93.65327°W

Bear Creek is a stream in Johnson County in the U.S. state of Missouri. It is a tributary of the Blackwater River.

Bear Creek was named for the fact the area was a hunting ground for bears by pioneer citizens.

== See also ==
- List of rivers of Missouri
