= Mill Creek (Wisconsin River tributary) =

Stream in Wisconsin, U.S.

Coordinates: 44°27′36″N 89°38′28″W

Mill Creek is a stream in the U.S. state of Wisconsin. It is a tributary to the Wisconsin River.

Mill Creek was named for the sawmills which once lined its banks. The native Chippewa-language name was Wau-pee-tee Se-be meaning "tooth river".
