= Bear Branch (Black River tributary) =

Stream in Missouri, U.S.

Bear Branch is a stream in Iron and Reynolds counties in the U.S. state of Missouri. It is a tributary of the Black River.

The stream headwaters arise in Iron County at 37°21′52″N 90°44′50″W and the stream flows southwest to its confluence in Reynolds County with the Black River at 37°19′19″N 90°45′49″W. The source area for the stream is southwest of Annapolis and the stream flows parallel to Missouri Route K to join the Black at the north end of Clearwater Lake.

Bear Branch was named for the bears along its course.

== See also ==
- List of rivers of Missouri
