= Bear Branch (Burris Fork tributary) =

Stream in Missouri, U.S.

Coordinates: 38.5419717°N 92.582134°W

Bear Branch is a stream in Moniteau County in the U.S. state of Missouri. It is a tributary of Burris Fork.

Bear Branch was named for the fact the area was a hunting ground of bears by pioneer citizens.
