= Bear Creek (Wisconsin River tributary) =

Stream in Richland and Sauk County, Wisconsin, U.S.

Coordinates: 43°11′49″N 90°15′14″W

Bear Creek is a stream in Richland and Sauk counties, in the U.S. state of Wisconsin. It is a tributary of the Wisconsin River.

Bear Creek was named from the bears seen there by early settlers. The creek lends its name to the town of Bear Creek, Sauk County, Wisconsin.

== See also ==
- List of rivers of Wisconsin
