= Davis Creek (Blackwater River tributary) =

Stream in Missouri, United States

Coordinates: 38°57′32″N 93°25′24″W

Davis Creek is a stream in Lafayette and Saline counties in the U.S. state of Missouri. It is a tributary of the Blackwater River.

Davis Creek was named after members of the Davis family of pioneer citizens.

== See also ==
- List of rivers of Missouri
