= Bear Creek (meteorite) =

Meteorite found in the United States

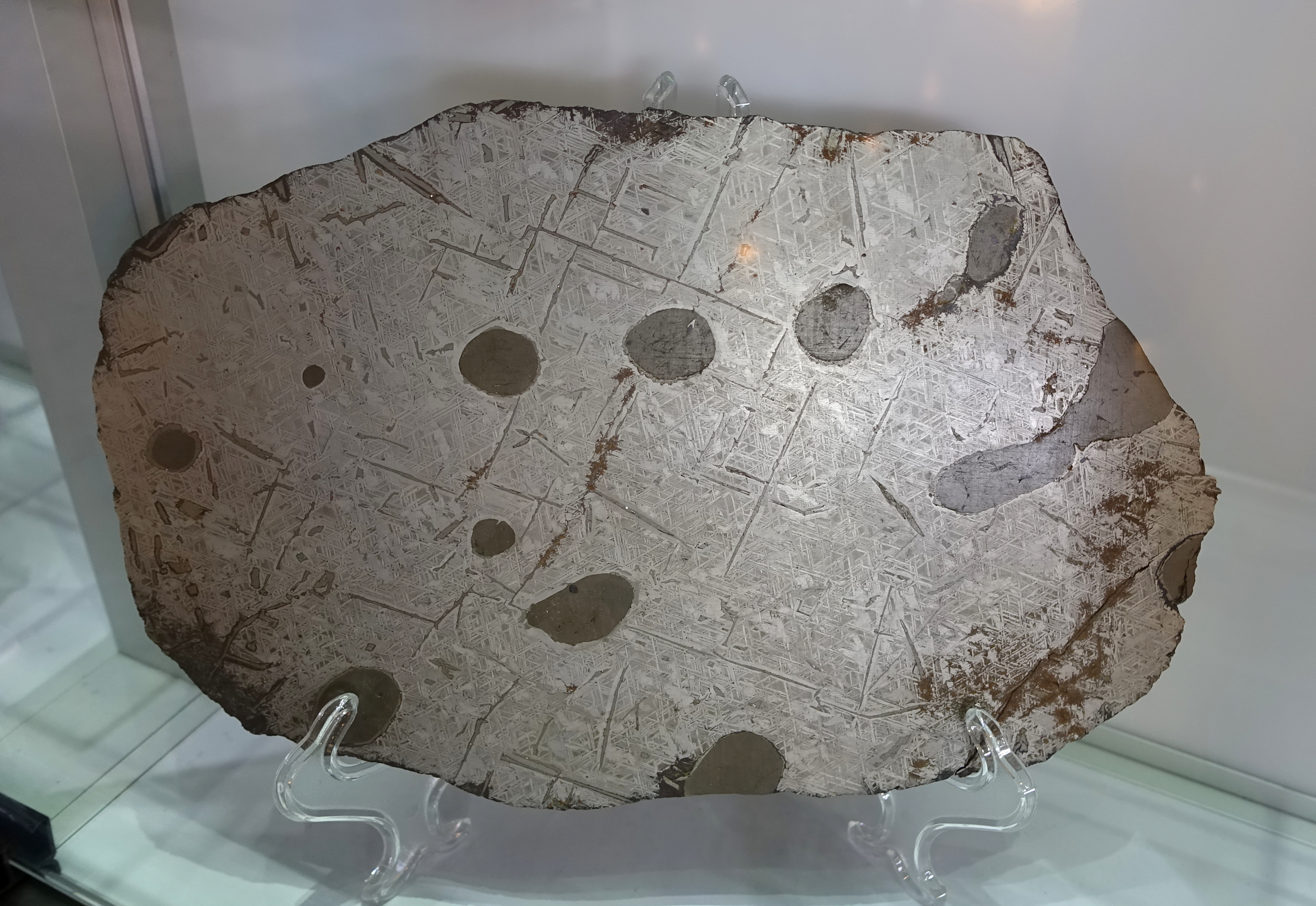
- Bear Creek meteorite exhibit at the Center for Meteorite Studies, Tempe, Arizona.
- Type: Medium octahedrite
- Class: IIIAB
- Group: Iron
- Country: United States
- Region: Jefferson County, Colorado
- Coordinates: 39°36′N 105°18′W
- Observed fall: No
- TKW: 226.79 kilograms (500.0 lb)
- Related media on Wikimedia Commons

The Bear Creek meteorite, formerly known as the Colorado meteorite, is an octahedrite meteorite that was found in 1866 in Jefferson County, Colorado, United States. It has a mass of 226.7 kg (500 lb) and average dimensions of 350 mm × 250 mm × 11 mm (13.78 in × 9.84 in × 0.43 in). The Bear Creek meteorite is a IIIAB iron meteor which is the largest class of metoerite.

== See also ==
- Glossary of meteoritics
