= Bear Creek (Des Moines River tributary) =

Stream in Iowa, U.S.

Coordinates: 41°58′37″N 93°54′08″W

Bear Creek is a stream in the U.S. state of Iowa. It is a tributary to the Des Moines River.

Bear Creek was named from a pioneer incident when hunter killed a bear near its course.
