= Bear Branch Nature Center =

Nature center in Carroll County, Maryland, US

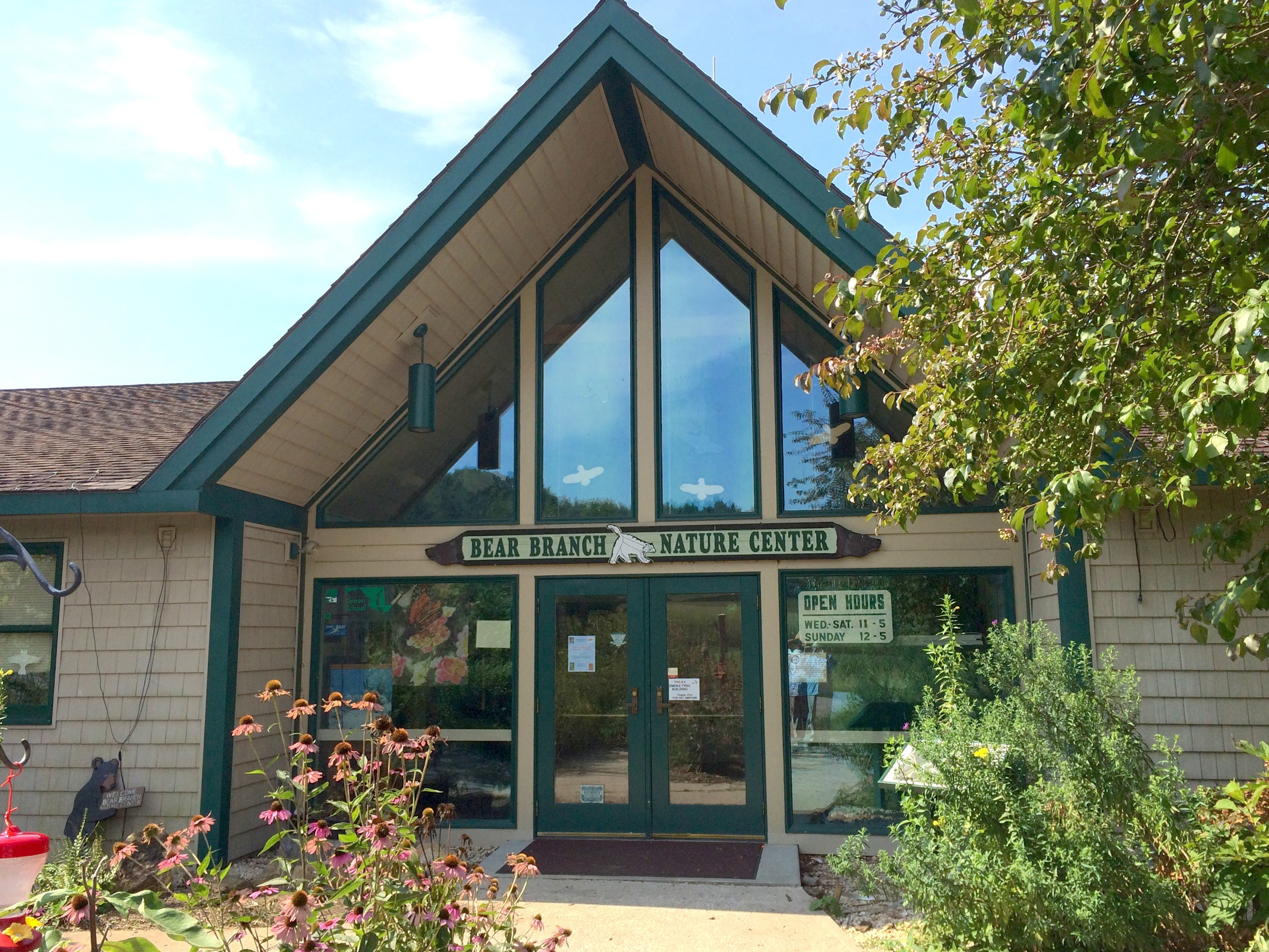
- Interactive map of Bear Branch Nature Center
- Type: Nature Center
- Location: 300 John Owings Road; Westminster, Maryland
- Coordinates: 39°38′39″N 76°59′26″W
- Area: 4,000 sq ft (370 m^{2})
- Created: 1993
- Operator: Carroll County, Maryland
- Hiking trails: 5 miles (8.0 km)
- Parking: On-site lot
- Other information: exhibits, live animals, observatory, planetarium
- Website: ccgovernment.carr.org

Bear Branch Nature Center is a nature center in Carroll County, Maryland near Westminster. It features interpretive exhibits about local plants and animals, an outdoor water feature and play area, a Discovery Room for children, live animals including an eagle, hawks, owls, snakes, salamanders, turtles, frogs, and toads, a planetarium and observatory. The center is a facility of Carroll County Recreation & Parks.

The nature center is adjacent to Hashawha Environmental Center, a residential facility that is also operated by Carroll County Recreation & Parks. Hashawha Environmental Center is home to the Carroll County Public Schools Outdoor School, a residential environmental education program open to every sixth-grade student in the county.

The two facilities are located on approximately 320 acres, with more than five miles of multi-use trails, a restored 19th-century cabin, a lake, a pond, and access to both Bear Branch and Big Pipe Creek.

== History ==
In 1972, the county purchased the land on which the Bear Branch Nature Center and Hashawha Environmental Center were built. The name "Hashawha" is a Native American word meaning "old fields."

== Hashawha Tower ==
The Hashawha Tower is a 10 m (35 ft) tall windmill donated to and located at Hashawha Environmental Center.

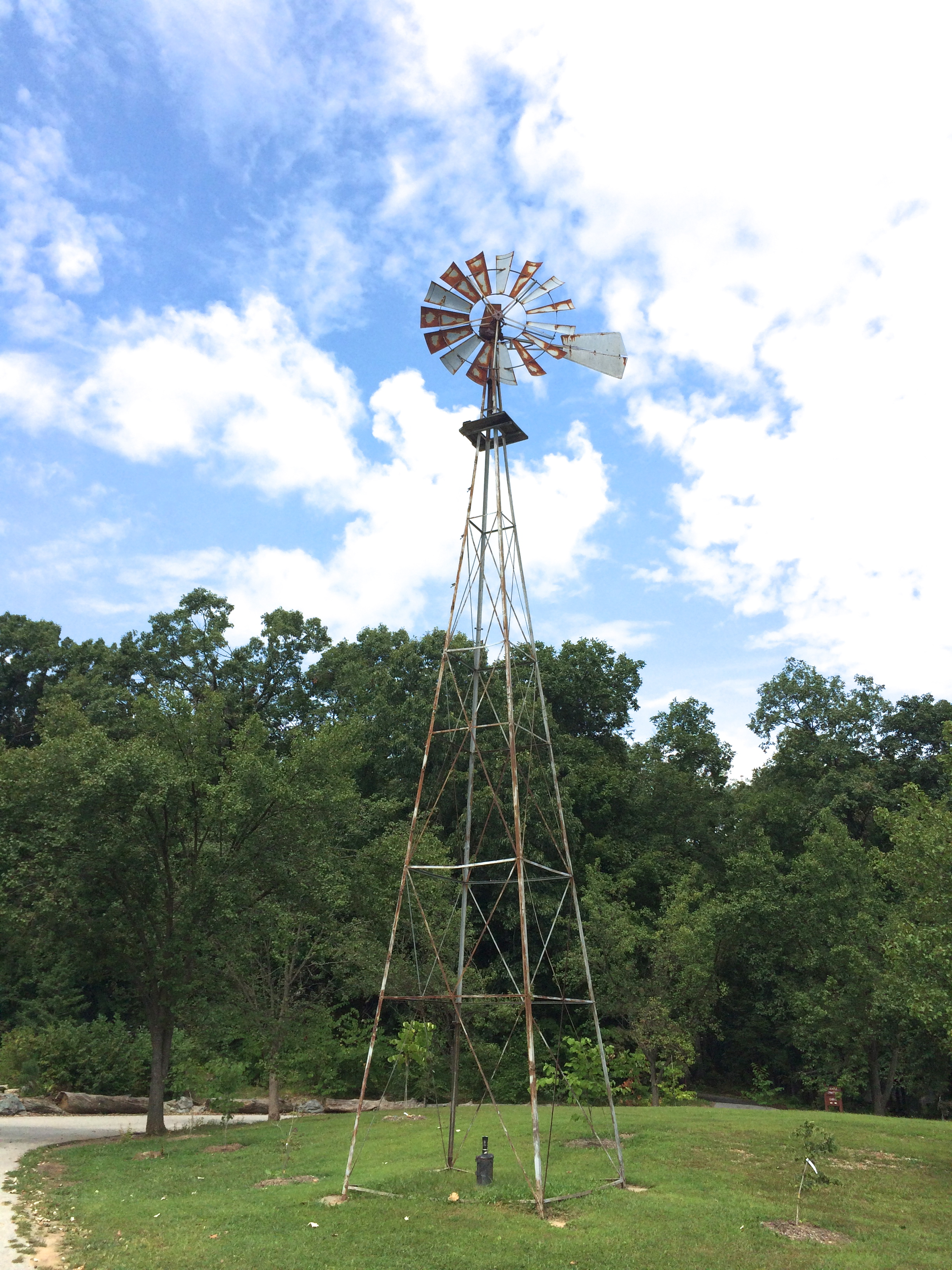
The "Hashawha Tower," a windmill at Hashawha Environmental Center, Carroll County, Maryland.

== Gallery ==
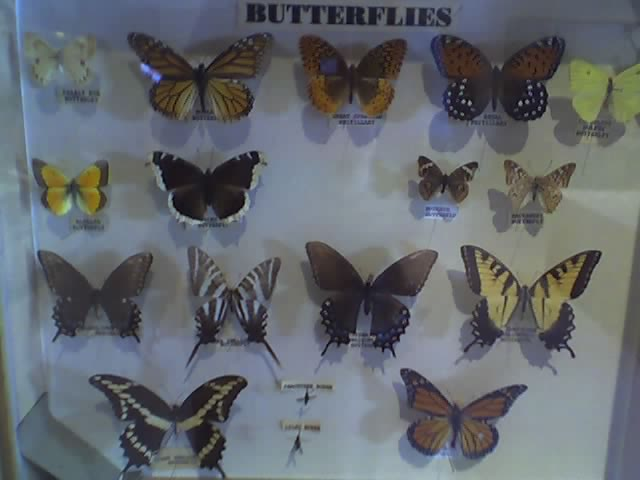
Butterflies on display in the Exhibit Hall

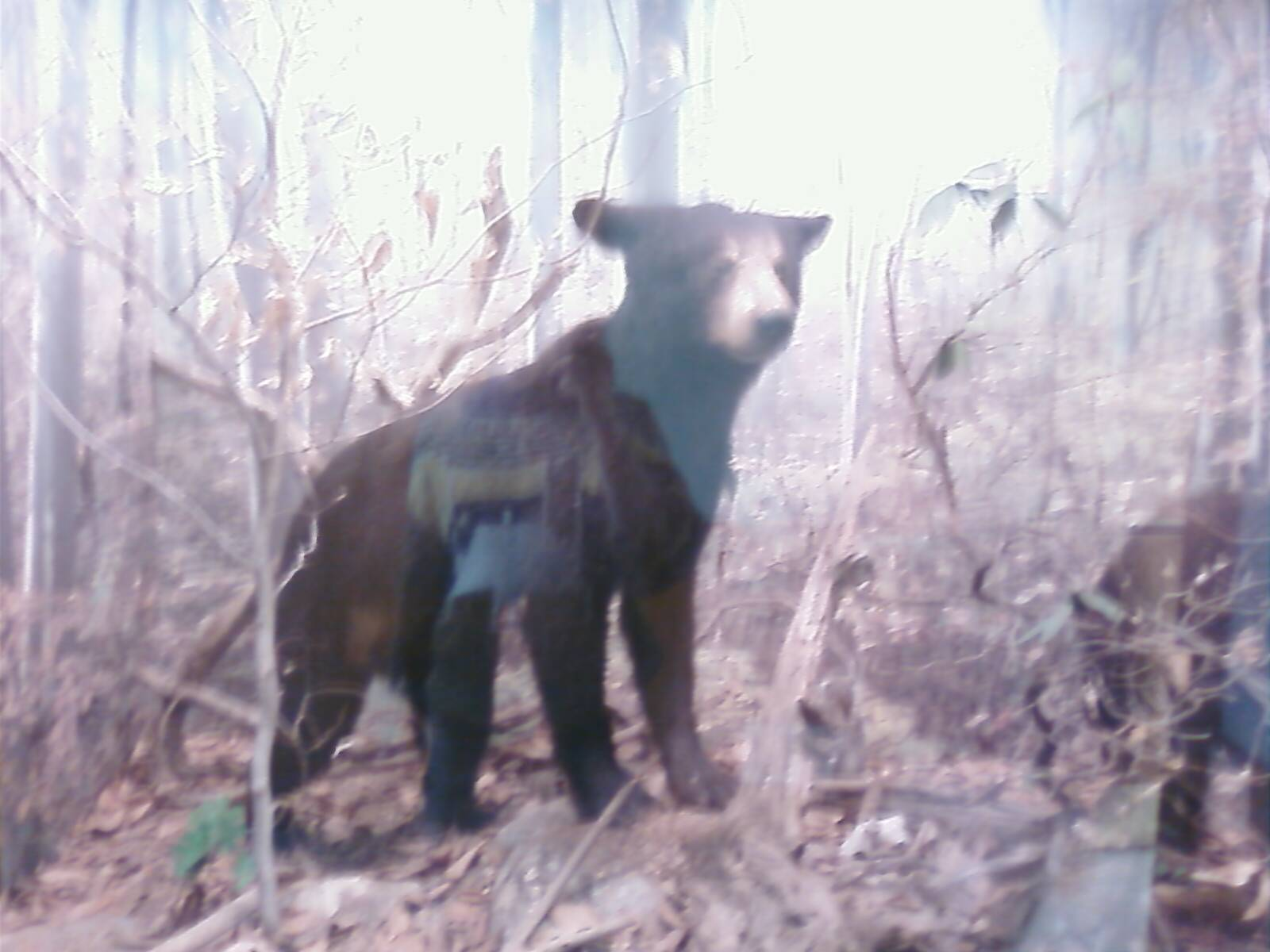
Bear exhibit

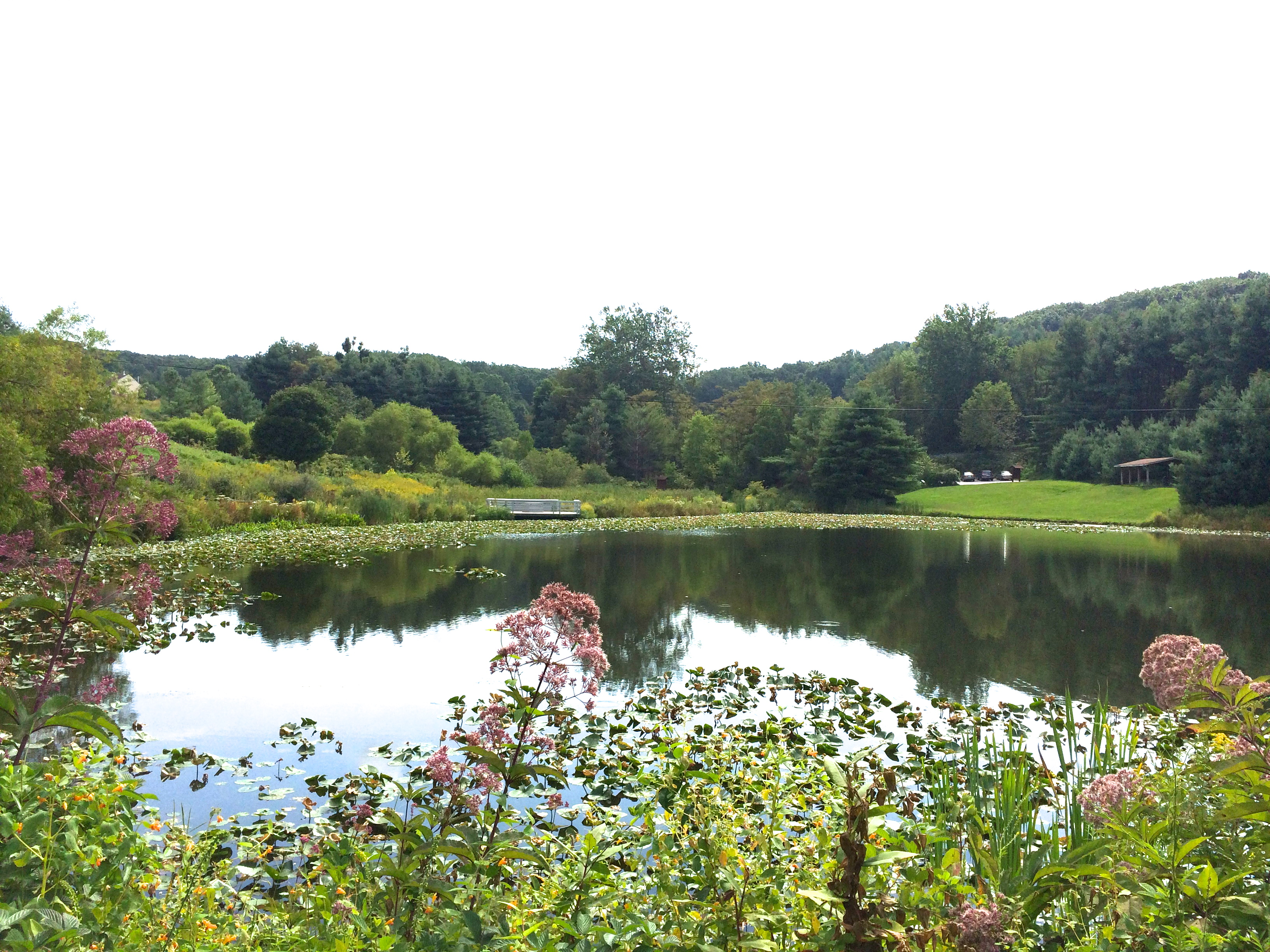
Lake Hashawha

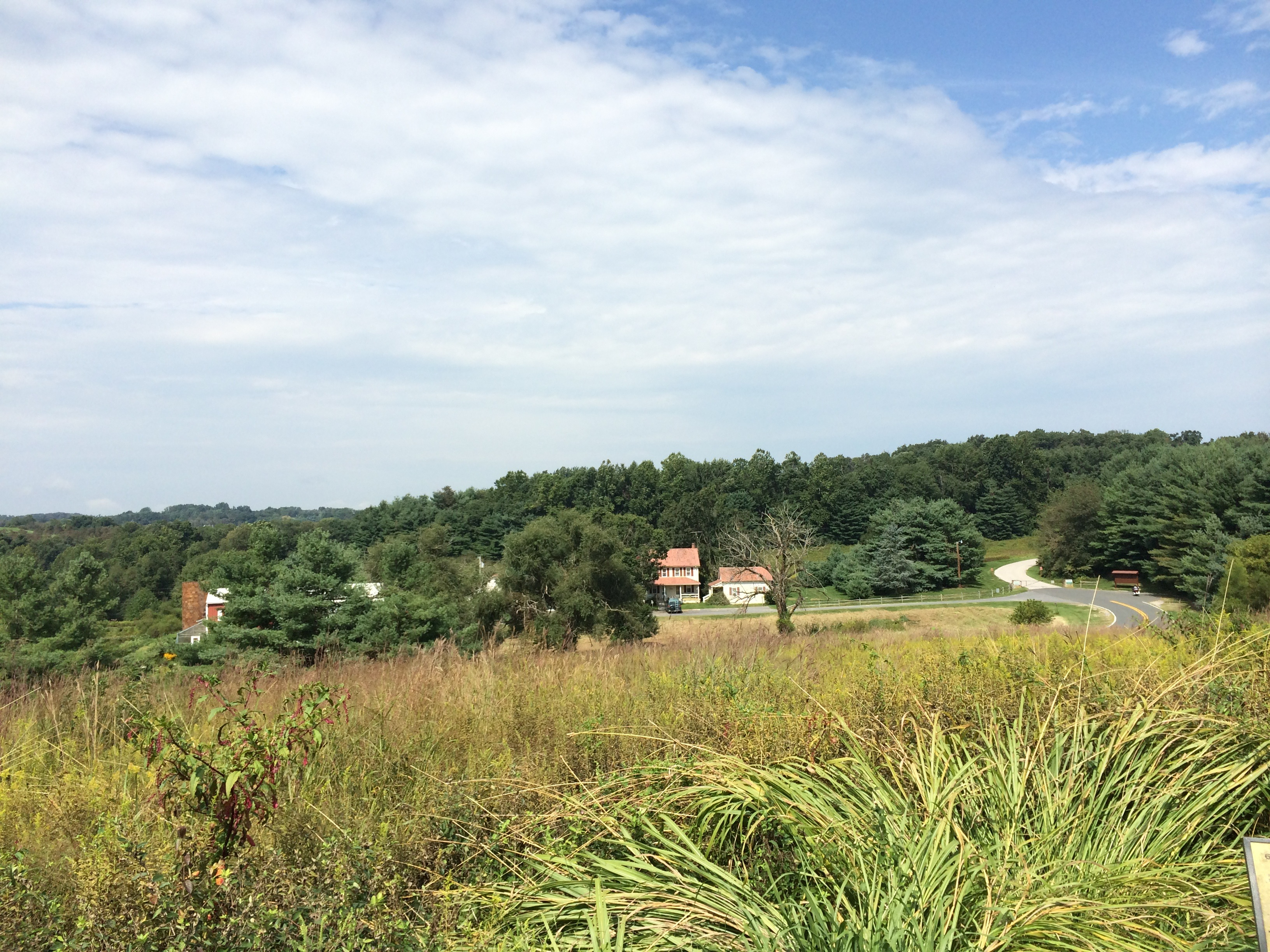
View of the caretaker's residence

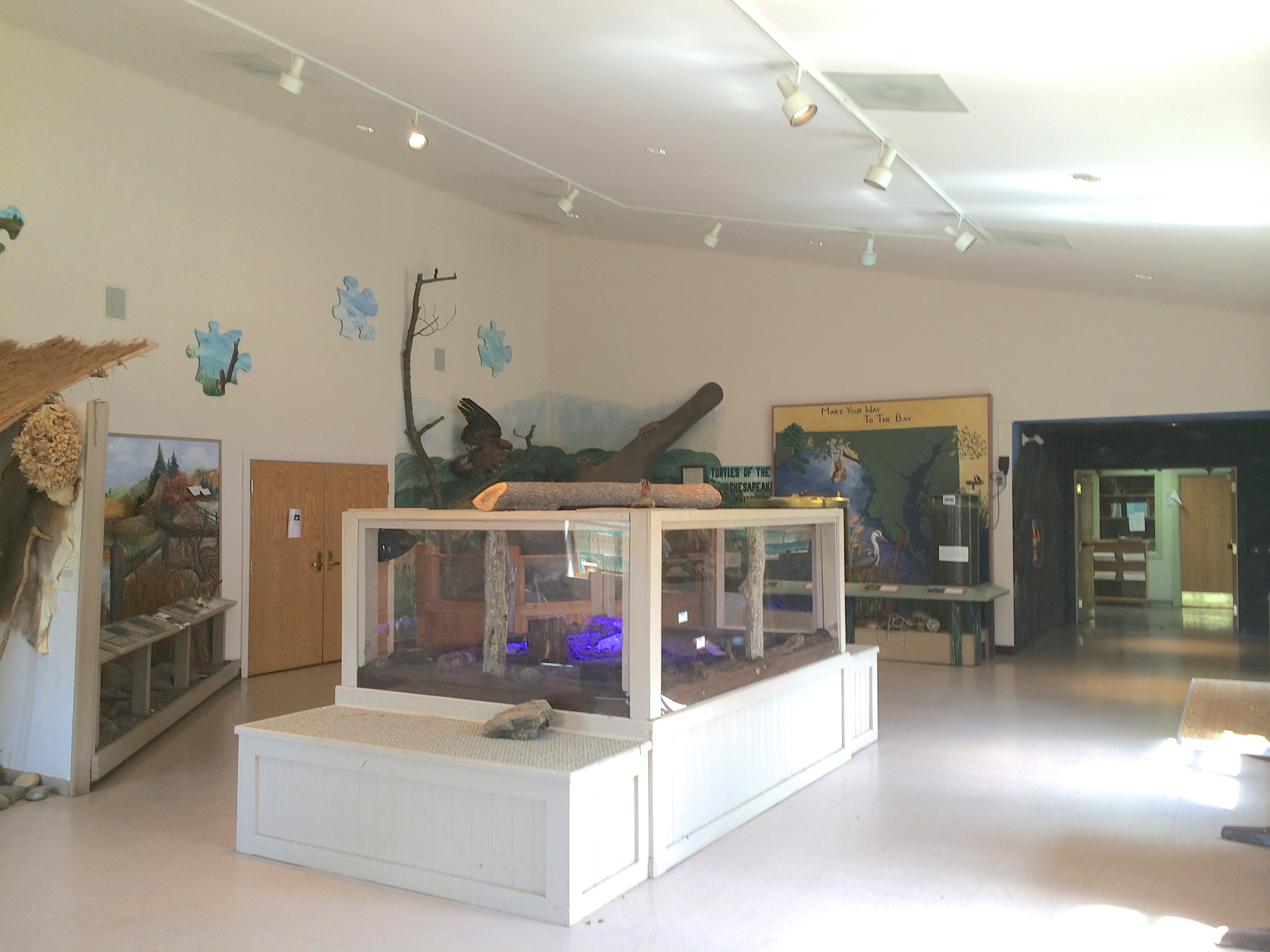
View of the Exhibit Hall

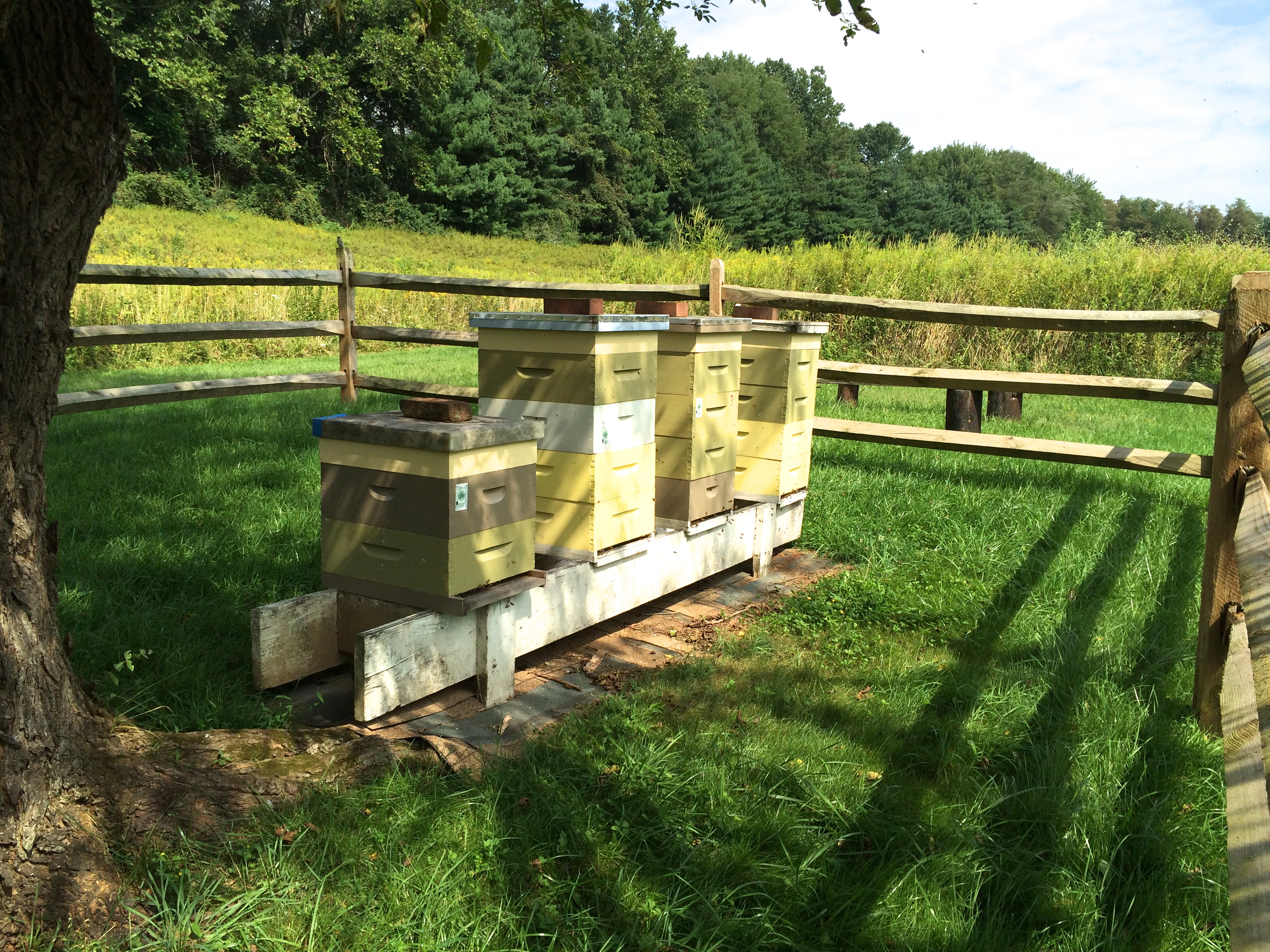
Bee hives on the property
