= Bear Branch (Spencer Creek tributary) =

Stream in Missouri, U.S.

Coordinates: 39.39004°N 91.5723793°W

Bear Branch is a stream in Ralls County in the U.S. state of Missouri. It is a tributary of Spencer Creek.

Bear Branch was so named on account of bears in the area.

== See also ==
- List of rivers of Missouri
