= Bear Creek, San Joaquin County, California =

Unincorporated community in California, United States

Bear Creek, California
- Unincorporated community
- Location within California Location within the United States
- Coordinates: 38°05′02″N 121°14′34″W
- Country: United States
- State: California
- County: San Joaquin
- Elevation: 49 ft (15 m)
- Time zone: UTC-8 (Pacific (PST))
  - Summer (DST): UTC-7 (PDT)
- Area code: 209
- GNIS feature ID: 1658014

Bear Creek is an unincorporated community in San Joaquin County, California, United States. The community is near its namesake stream Bear Creek, 3.6 miles (5.8 km) south-southeast of Lodi.
