= Bear Lake (Oregon) =

Bear Lake may refer to one of several lakes in the U.S. state of Oregon:

name	type	elevation	coordinate	USGS Map	GNIS ID
Bear Lake (Linn County, Oregon)	Lake	3,274 ft (998 m)		Idanha	1137720
Bear Lake (Union County, Oregon)	Lake	7,185 ft (2,190 m)		Krag Peak	1137721
Bear Lake (Wallowa County, Oregon)	Lake	7,900 ft (2,400 m)		North Minam Meadows	1137722
Bear Lake (Hood River County, Oregon)	Lake	3,904 ft (1,190 m)		Mount Defiance	1137723
Bear Lake (Marion County, Oregon)	Lake	5,269 ft (1,606 m)		Mount Jefferson	1137724
Bear Lake (Lane County, Oregon)	Lake	115 ft (35 m)		Florence	1153420
Too Much Bear Lake (Lane County, Oregon)	Lake	4,117 ft (1,255 m)		Diamond Peak	1151338

== See also ==
- List of lakes in Oregon

44°39′28″N 122°02′37″W 45°06′03″N 117°20′47″W 45°17′43″N 117°26′56″W 45°38′59″N 121°44′03″W 44°44′57″N 121°50′33″W 43°56′40″N 124°07′16″W 43°36′38″N 122°07′51″W
