= Bear Brook (Sands Creek tributary) =

- Location of the mouth of Bear Brook

Location
- Country: United States
- State: New York
- County: Delaware

Physical characteristics
- Source
  - coordinates: 41°58′42″N 75°17′28″W
- Mouth: Sands Creek
  - coordinates: 41°57′42″N 75°17′50″W
  - elevation: 932 ft (284 m)

Bear Brook is a river in Delaware County, New York, United States. It flows into Sands Creek northwest of Hancock.
