= Bear Creek (Loyalsock Creek tributary) =

River in Pennsylvania, United States

Coordinates: 41°23′32″N 76°48′05″W

Bear Creek (also known as "Big Bear Creek") is a 6.2-mile-long (10.0 km) tributary of Loyalsock Creek in Lycoming County, Pennsylvania, in the United States.

== See also ==
- List of rivers of Pennsylvania
