= Bear Creek, Florida =

- Census-designated place & Unincorporated community
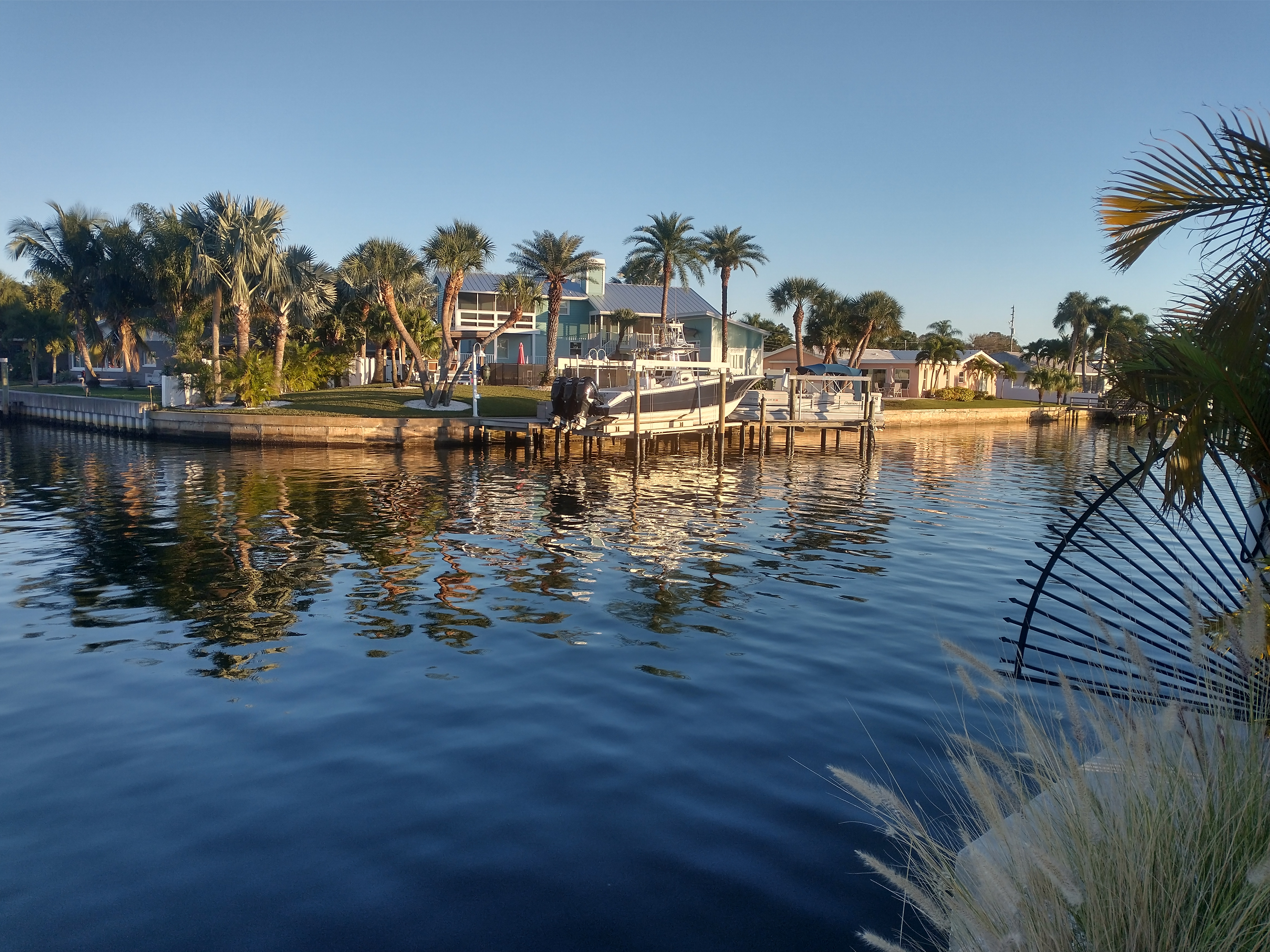
- The mouth of Bear Creek, the body of water running through Bear Creek, Florida.

- Location within Florida Location within the United States
- Coordinates: 27°45′12″N 82°43′42″W
- Country: United States
- State: Florida
- County: Pinellas

Area
  - Total: 0.54 sq mi (1.40 km^{2})
  - Land: 0.39 sq mi (1.00 km^{2})
  - Water: 0.15 sq mi (0.40 km^{2})
- Elevation: 3 ft (0.91 m)

Population (2020)
  - Total: 1,906
  - Density: 4,919.3/sq mi (1,899.37/km^{2})
- Time zone: UTC-5 (Eastern (EST))
  - Summer (DST): UTC-4 (EDT)
- ZIP code: 33707
- Area code: 813
- FIPS code: 12-04735
- GNIS feature ID: 2583328

Bear Creek is an unincorporated community and census-designated place (CDP) in Pinellas County, Florida, United States. As of the 2020 census, Bear Creek had a population of 1,906.

== Geography ==
Bear Creek is bordered by the cities of South Pasadena to the west, St. Petersburg to the north, and Gulfport to the east. Boca Ciega Bay is to the south.

According to the United States Census Bureau, the CDP has a total area of 0.42 square miles (1.1 km^{2}), of which 0.39 square miles (1.0 km^{2}) is land and 0.04 square miles (0.1 km^{2}) (5.81%) is water.

== Demographics ==
Historical population
Census	Pop.	Note	%±
2010	1,948		—
2020	1,906		−2.2%
U.S. Decennial Census

Bear Creek first appeared as a census designated place in the 2010 U.S. census.

=== Racial and ethnic composition ===
Bear Creek CDP, Florida – Racial and ethnic composition Note: the US Census treats Hispanic/Latino as an ethnic category. This table excludes Latinos from the racial categories and assigns them to a separate category. Hispanics/Latinos may be of any race.
Race / Ethnicity (NH = Non-Hispanic)	Pop 2010	Pop 2020	% 2010	% 2020
White alone (NH)	1,749	1,585	89.78%	83.16%
Black or African American alone (NH)	40	37	2.05%	1.94%
Native American or Alaska Native alone (NH)	5	0	0.26%	0.00%
Asian alone (NH)	40	31	2.05%	1.63%
Native Hawaiian or Pacific Islander alone (NH)	0	1	0.00%	0.05%
Other race alone (NH)	5	20	0.26%	1.05%
Mixed race or Multiracial (NH)	24	90	1.23%	4.72%
Hispanic or Latino (any race)	85	142	4.36%	7.45%
Total	1,948	1,906	100.00%	100.00%

=== 2020 census ===
As of the 2020 census, Bear Creek had a population of 1,906. The median age was 54.6 years. 10.5% of residents were under the age of 18 and 28.4% of residents were 65 years of age or older. For every 100 females there were 95.3 males, and for every 100 females age 18 and over there were 96.0 males age 18 and over.

100.0% of residents lived in urban areas, while 0.0% lived in rural areas.

There were 963 households in Bear Creek, of which 13.6% had children under the age of 18 living in them. Of all households, 38.2% were married-couple households, 22.9% were households with a male householder and no spouse or partner present, and 29.2% were households with a female householder and no spouse or partner present. About 36.3% of all households were made up of individuals and 17.1% had someone living alone who was 65 years of age or older.

There were 1,210 housing units, of which 20.4% were vacant. The homeowner vacancy rate was 2.3% and the rental vacancy rate was 17.6%.

Racial composition as of the 2020 census
Race	Number	Percent
White	1,612	84.6%
Black or African American	43	2.3%
American Indian and Alaska Native	0	0.0%
Asian	31	1.6%
Native Hawaiian and Other Pacific Islander	1	0.1%
Some other race	41	2.2%
Two or more races	178	9.3%
