= Bear Creek (North Fork Salt River tributary) =

Stream in Missouri, U.S.

Coordinates: 39.8305929°N 92.2301817°W

Bear Creek is a stream in the U.S. state of Missouri. It is a tributary of the North Fork Salt River.

Bear Creek was named after a pioneer incident in which a bear was killed near its course.

== See also ==
- List of rivers of Missouri
