= Bear Creek (Middle Fork Grand River tributary) =

Stream in Missouri, U.S.

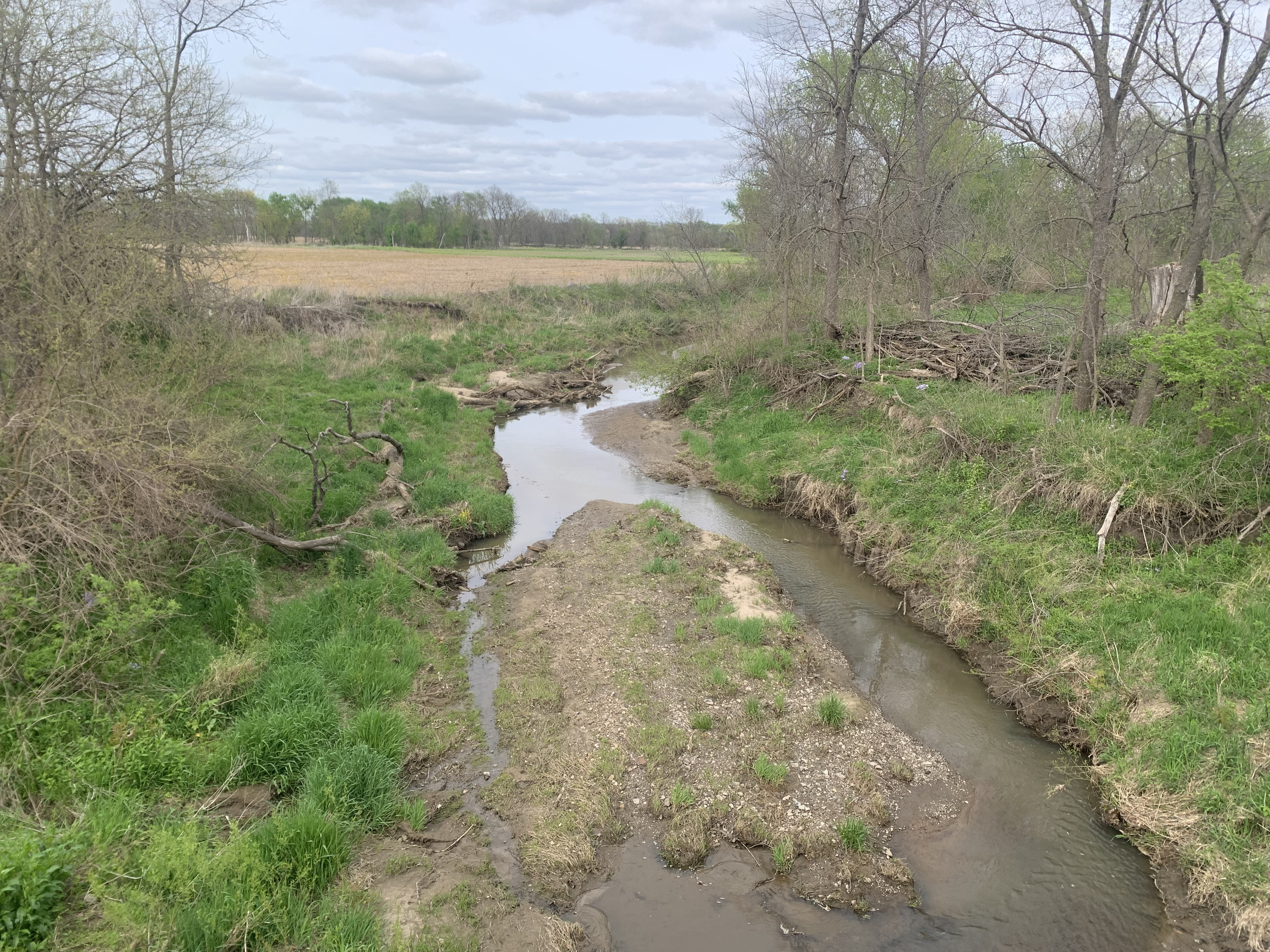
Bear Creek on Route YY bridge north of Gentry, Missouri

Bear Creek is a stream in Gentry and Worth counties in the U.S. state of Missouri. It is a tributary of the Middle Fork Grand River.

The stream headwaters arise in Worth County at 40°28′31″N 94°29′25″W and an elevation of approximately 1080 feet. The stream flows south-southeast passing west of Worth into Gentry County to its confluence with the Middle Fork at 40°21′16″N 94°25′29″W at an elevation of 873 feet. The confluence is approximately one mile north of Gentry.

Bear Creek received its name from a pioneer incident in which a bear was killed near its course.

== See also ==
- List of rivers of Missouri
