= Fretboard Journal =

American music magazine

- Categories: Music
- Frequency: Quarterly
- Founder: Michael Simmons and Jason Verlinde
- First issue: November 2005; 20 years ago
- Company: Occasional Publishing
- Country: United States
- Based in: Seattle
- Language: English
- Website: www.fretboardjournal.com
- ISSN: 1558-0326

The Fretboard Journal is a keepsake magazine for guitar, mandolin, and stringed instrument players. In the same vein of other "coffee table magazines" such as The Surfer's Journal, the Golfer's Journal and the Rodder's Journal, it boasts high-end production values, lengthy interviews and exclusive photography in each issue. Each issue is filled with photos of rare instruments, well-known musicians, and even the workshops of instrument builders. The magazine is also distributed digitally.

The Fretboard Journal was founded by Michael Simmons, a veteran of musical instrument retail sales, and Jason Verlinde, a longtime music journalist. It is published out of Seattle, Washington. Years before, they collaborated on the Ukulele Occasional magazine, a small zine devoted to the four string instrument.

The first issue of the Fretboard Journal was unveiled in November 2005. Stories included an interview with mandolinist David Grisman, an interview with Charlie Louvin by Neko Case, and a profile of Santa Cruz Guitar Company. The second issue featured Case on the cover discussing tenor guitars, an article about [[C. F. Martin & Company}Martin Guitars]]', history and an interview with mandolinist Andy Statman. Issues now come out every three months.

In 2006, the magazine was the only publication listed in the Washington Post's annual Best of 2006: Music section. It was also profiled in the July 2009 issue of Seattle magazine. In 2022, they published their 50th edition.

The magazine is known for its long-form journalism and in-depth interviews, often several thousand words long, covering a wide array of musician subjects and styles. It also often frequently asks well known musicians to interview their musical heroes. In addition to Case interviewing Louvin, the magazine has had Ben Harper interview David Lindley for the Fall 2008 issue; Bill Frisell interview Jim Hall for the Winter 2008 issue and Thurston Moore of Sonic Youth interview Michael Chapman for the Winter 2009 issue.

In collaboration with the Old Town School Of Folk Music in Chicago, the magazine hosts an annual Fretboard Summit event featuring luthiers, artists, and journalists. The Summit is held at the Lincoln Square campus of the Old Town School of Folk Music. Prominent performers include Julian Lage, Bill Frisell, and Tommy Emmanuel

More recently, the magazine has expanded to producing high-definition videos of many of its subjects, including Jackson Browne, David Crosby and many other artists and builders. They also have a weekly podcast featuring many of the magazine's subjects and artists.

In 2012, the magazine celebrated its seventh anniversary with a party for its subscribers and contributors in Seattle's Fremont neighborhood. Performers at the party included Bill Frisell, Reignwolf, Eric Skye and many others. The magazine posted photos from the event on its website.
