= Bear Lake (Michigan) =

Lake in Kalkaska County, Michigan

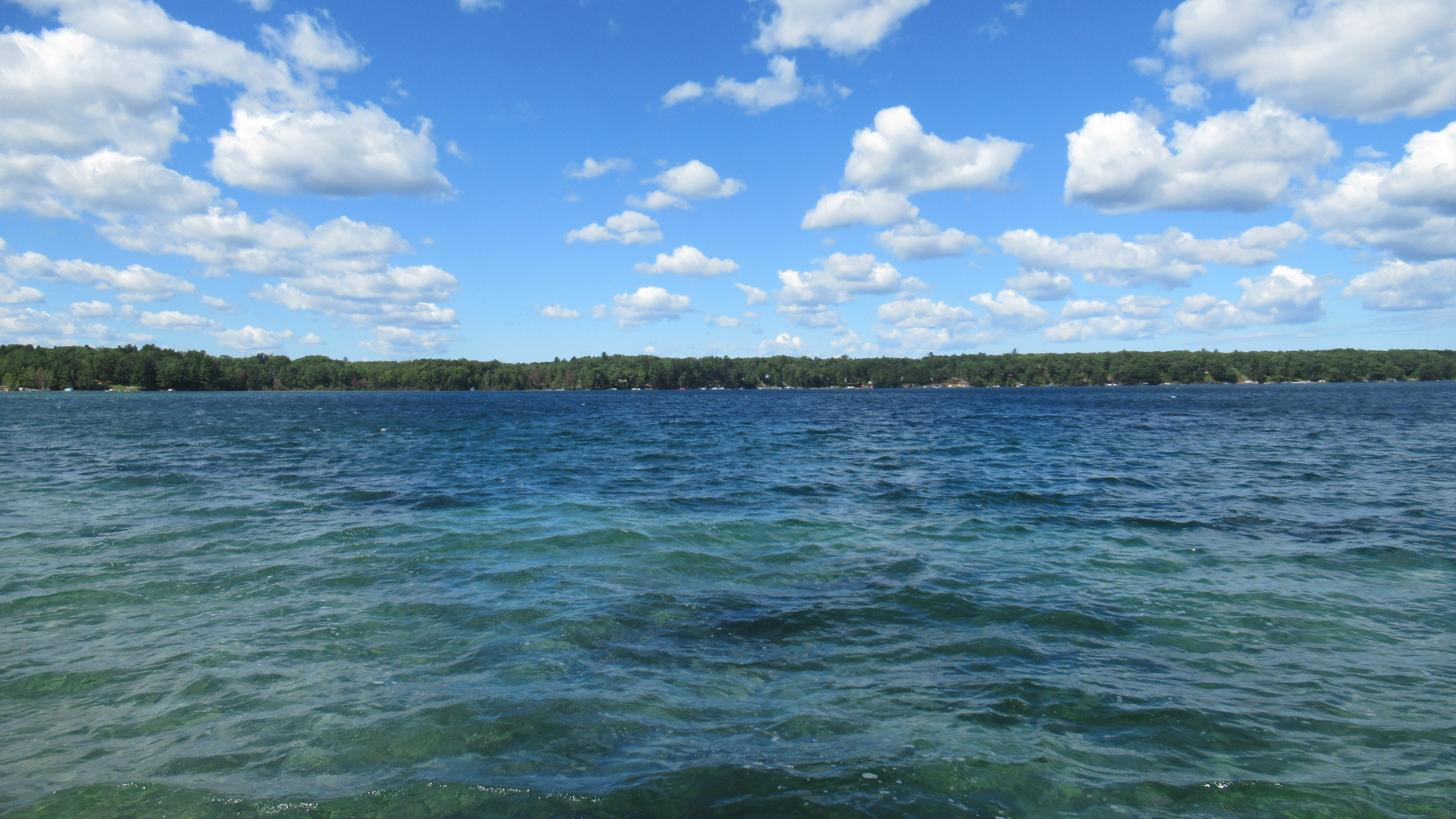
- View from the boating access point

- Location within Michigan Location within the United States
- Location: Bear Lake Township, Michigan, U.S.
- Coordinates: 44°43′42″N 84°56′38″W
- Type: Lake
- Basin countries: United States
- Surface area: 316 acres (128 ha)
- Max. depth: 60 ft (18 m)
- Surface elevation: 1,181 feet (360 m)

A home on Bear Lake with requisite "Tiki Bar" on the shoreline

Bear Lake is a small, freshwater lake in Kalkaska County, Michigan, United States. The lake has enhanced clarity due to springs that feed into it. Numerous "Tiki Bars" dot the shoreline, placed there by the surrounding homeowners. The lake has a public sandy beach.

A slalom waterskier on Bear Lake

== See also ==
- List of lakes in Michigan
