= Bear Branch (Bear Creek tributary) =

Stream in Missouri, U.S.

Coordinates: 39°55′52″N 93°03′07″W

Bear Branch is a stream in Linn and Sullivan counties in the U.S. state of Missouri. It is a tributary of Bear Creek.

Bear Branch was named for the bears near its course.

== See also ==
- List of rivers of Missouri
