= Bear Creek (Contra Costa County) =

Creek in Contra Costa County, California

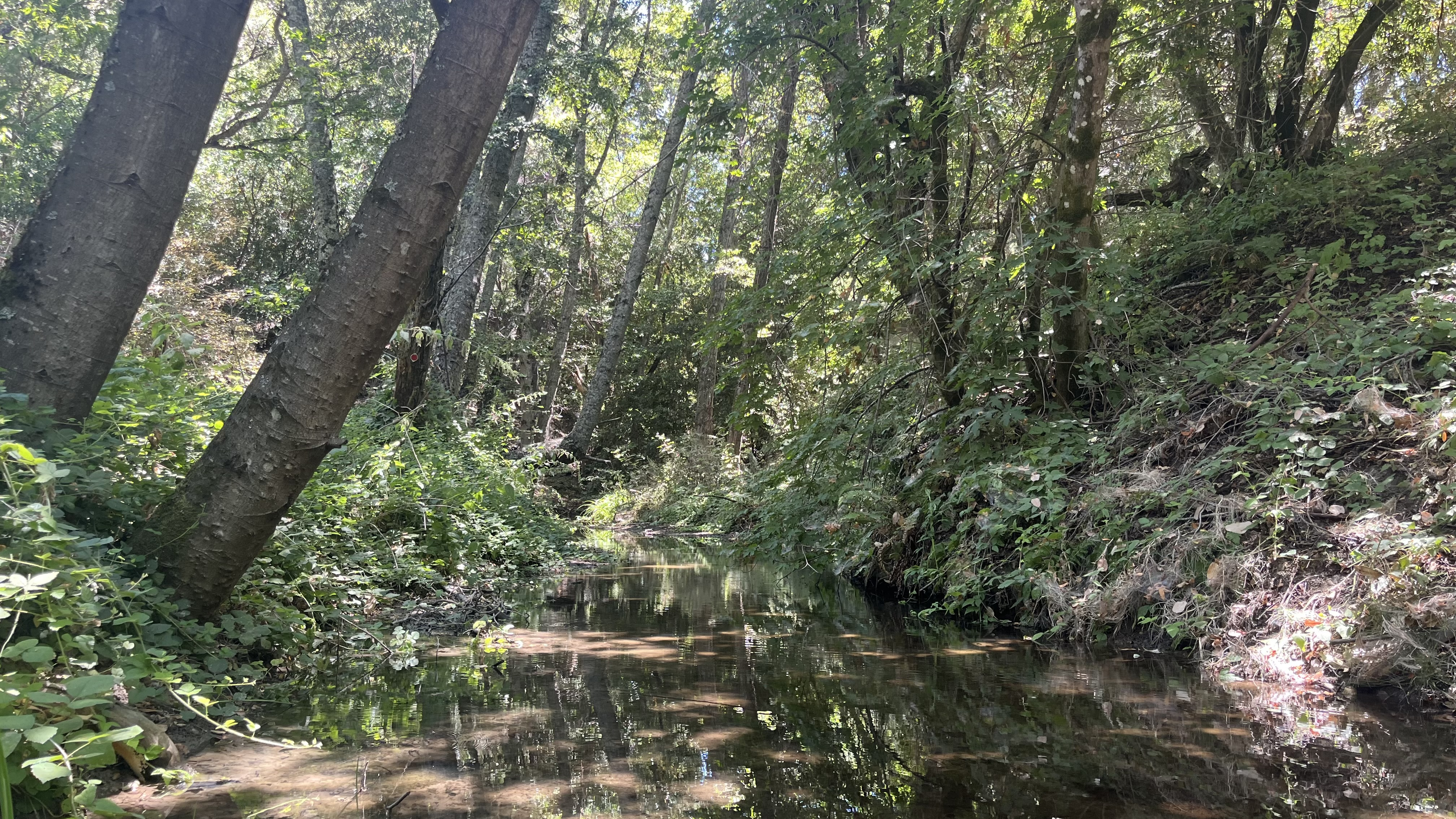
- A photo of Bear Creek not far from the Briones Reservoir. Its banks are well-shaded by a variety of oaks, bay trees and alders. (July 31st, 2024)

Location
- Country: United States
- State: California
- County: Contra Costa

Physical characteristics
- Source
  - location: Briones Regional Park, California
  - coordinates: 37°55′48.00″N 122°07′37.00″W
- Mouth
  - location: San Pablo Reservoir, California
  - coordinates: 37°55′22.73″N 122°10′17.88″W
- Length: ~1 mile

Basin features
- Tributaries
  - left: Russel Creek
  - right: Rose Creek, Cascade Creek

Bear Creek is an approximately 1 mile long creek in Contra Costa County, California. It is the largest tributary to San Pablo Creek. Its name comes from a 1,000 pound California grizzly bear killed on the stream by Ramon Briones in 1897.

== Course ==
Bear Creek begins as a number of intermittent streams within Briones Regional Park. Named tributaries to Bear Creek include: Rose Creek, Russel Creek and Cascade Creek, named for a small waterfall formed by an outcrop of Briones Sandstone.

Bear Creek flows generally west to its mouth at the Briones Reservoir near Orinda, California.

It flows for a short distance more below Briones Reservoir to its confluence with San Pablo Creek at San Pablo Reservoir.

== Geography ==
All of Bear Creek's present course is contained within Briones Regional Park, near Briones Valley, California.

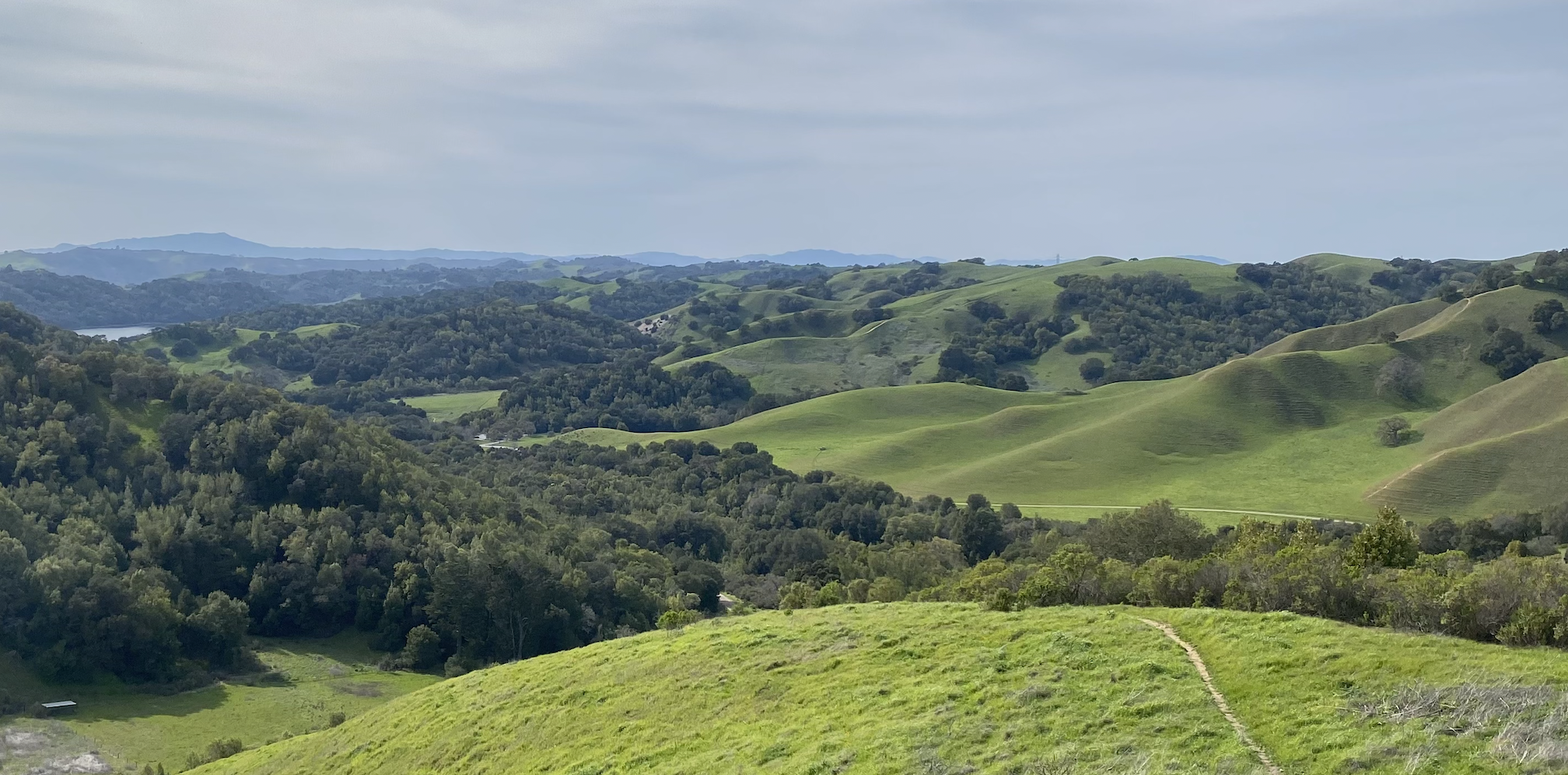
A view looking west down the Bear Creek watershed in Briones Regional Park, showing the coast mixed evergreen forest and grassland typical of the Bear Creek valley. Mount Tamalpais is visible in the distance. (March 24, 2021)

Much of the upper watershed is accessible through hiking and biking trails administered by the East Bay Regional Park District and the East Bay Municipal Utility District (EBMUD). Briones Regional Park is particularly popular with cyclists and local hikers. There are two staging areas located on Bear Creek within Briones Regional park.

Bear Creek was dammed in 1964 to create the Briones Reservoir, which is operated by EBMUD. The reservoir is filled with water imported from the Mokelumne Aqueduct, as Bear Creek and other local streams do not provide sufficient natural flow (~5% of reservoir volume). It is part of a regional water importation and storage complex to service the water needs of the East Bay, a region home to over 2.8 million residents. A large portion of the lower Bear Creek watershed and its tributaries were submerged as a result of this construction.

== Ecology ==
Nearly the entirety of the Bear Creek watershed is undeveloped and within open space or conservation boundaries, making it a rare and sensitive stream in the San Francisco Bay Area. The watershed is covered in coast mixed evergreen forest with dominant trees being Coast Live Oak (Quercus agrifolia), California Bay (Umbellularia Californica) and Valley Oak (Quercus lobata), with some occurrences of Blue oak (Quercus douglasii).

Animals like Black-tailed deer, Coyotes, Cottontail rabbits, Red-shouldered hawk and a wide variety of others rely on Bear Creek for water and undisturbed habitat. Screech owls and Barn owls are particularly common and take advantage of the large numbers of lizards and small rodents in the area.

=== Steelhead Trout Population ===
Bear Creek likely supported a population of Steelhead or Rainbow trout (Onchorhynchus mykiss irideus) before alterations to its watershed and the construction of the Briones Reservoir. Trout have been known to ascend Bear Creek from Briones Reservoir to a point about half of a mile upstream, where a natural sandstone waterfall blocks access to the upper watershed.

Fishing in Bear Creek is strictly prohibited on account of the watershed's protected status under EBMUD management and the Central Valley Steelhead Distinct population segment's placement on the endangered species list.
