= Bear Creek Provincial Park =

Provincial park in British Columbia, Canada

- IUCN category II (national park)
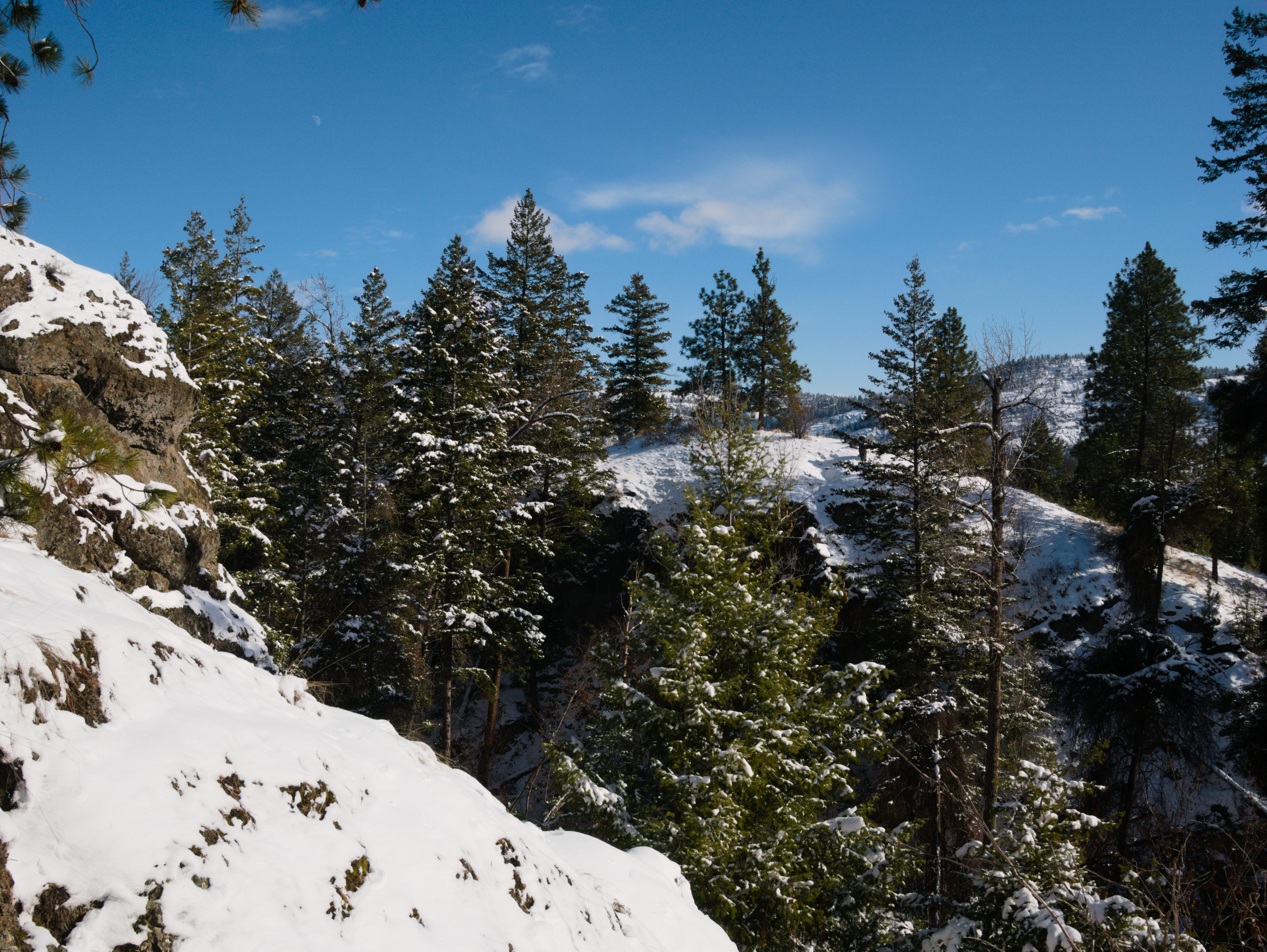
- A winter moon rising over the Okanagan Highland in Bear Creek Provincial Park

- Location within British Columbia Location within Regional District of Central Okanagan
- Interactive map of Bear Creek Provincial Park
- Location: Central Okanagan, British Columbia, Canada
- Nearest city: West Kelowna
- Coordinates: 49°55′51″N 119°31′18″W
- Area: 178 ha (440 acres)
- Established: 1988
- Visitors: 242,697 (in 2017-18)
- Governing body: BC Parks

Bear Creek Provincial Park is a provincial park in British Columbia, Canada. It is situated on the west side of the Okanagan Lake and is northwest of the city of Kelowna. It was established on April 19, 1981, and was expanded to its current size of 178 hectares (1.78 km^{2}; 440 acres) on May 12, 1988.

== Facilities ==
The park features a beach that is over 400 meters long and hiking trails that loop around the creek and surrounding canyon. The area is also used extensively for camping.

The park has approximately five kilometres of marked hiking trails that loop through the canyon, and alongside the Bear Creek, which offer views of a multitude of different plants, and the Okanagan Lake. Lakeside camping, and picnic areas are also available. There are also 145 campsites available on this land during peak season which are available to all!

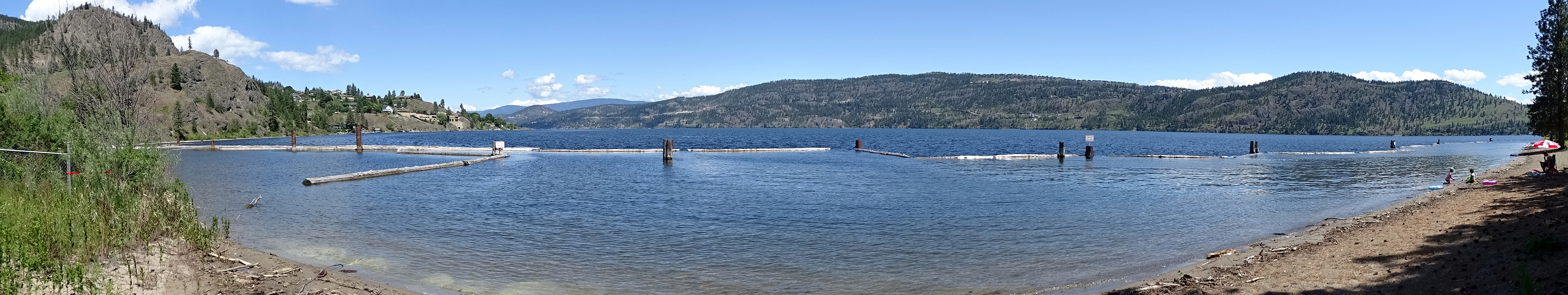
Okanagan Lake at Bear Creek Provincial Park
