= Bear Creek, Sauk County, Wisconsin =

Bear Creek, Wisconsin
- Town
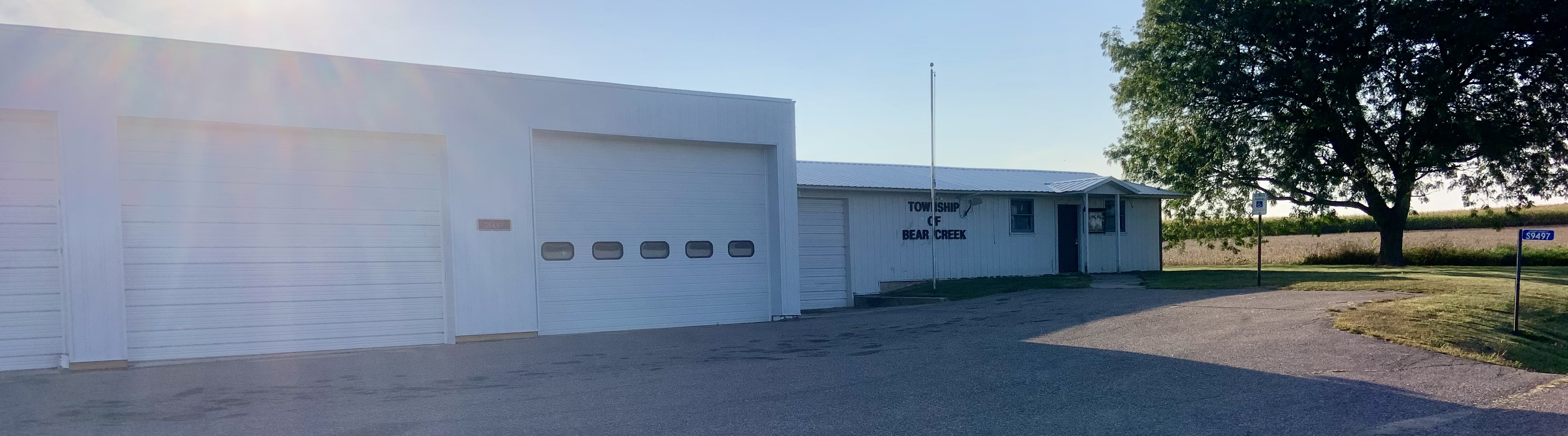
- Town hall

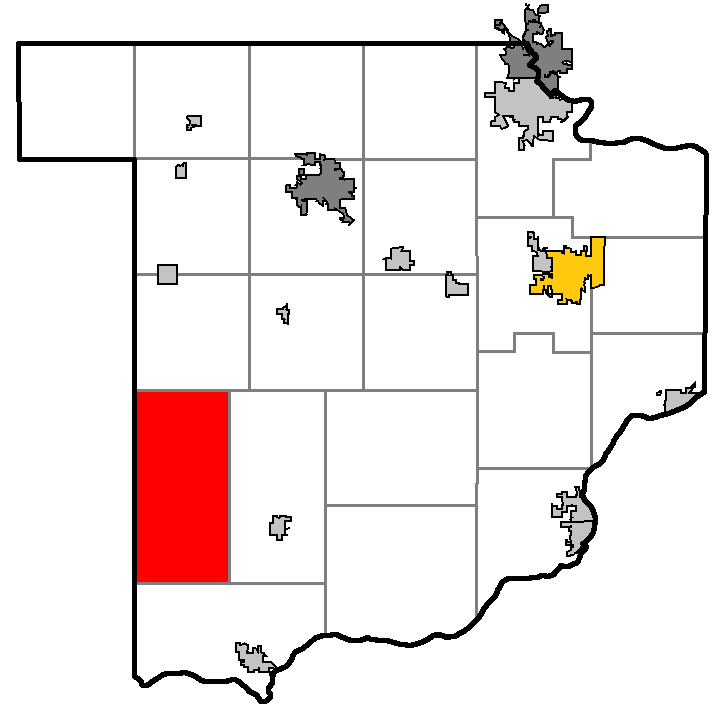
- Location of Bear Creek, Sauk County, Wisconsin

- Location of Sauk County, Wisconsin
- Coordinates: 43°19′48″N 90°9′16″W
- Country: United States
- State: Wisconsin
- County: Sauk

Area
  - Total: 49.7 sq mi (128.7 km^{2})
  - Land: 49.7 sq mi (128.7 km^{2})
  - Water: 0 sq mi (0.0 km^{2})
- Elevation: 863 ft (263 m)

Population (2020)
  - Total: 641
  - Density: 12.9/sq mi (4.98/km^{2})
- Time zone: UTC-6 (Central (CST))
  - Summer (DST): UTC-5 (CDT)
- Area code: 608
- FIPS code: 55-05600
- GNIS feature ID: 1582770
- Website: https://bearcreektown.wixsite.com/sauk

Bear Creek is a town in Sauk County, Wisconsin, United States. In September 1858, the town of Bear Creek was created out of the town of Franklin. The town consists of 50 sections and is bounded on the north by the town of Washington, on the south by the town of Spring Green, on the east by the town of Franklin, and on the west by Richland County. The population was 641 at the 2020 census. The town took its name from Bear Creek. The unincorporated community of Loreto is located in the town.

== Geography ==
According to the United States Census Bureau, the town has a total area of 49.7 square miles (128.7 km^{2}), all land.

== Demographics ==
As of the census of 2000, there were 497 people, 176 households, and 140 families residing in the town. The population density was 10.0 people per square mile (3.9/km^{2}). There were 211 housing units at an average density of 4.2 per square mile (1.6/km^{2}). The racial makeup of the town was 99.60% White, 0.40% from other races. Hispanic or Latino of any race were 0.80% of the population.

There were 176 households, out of which 38.1% had children under the age of 18 living with them, 67.6% were married couples living together, 6.8% had a female householder with no husband present, and 19.9% were non-families. 15.3% of all households were made up of individuals, and 4.5% had someone living alone who was 65 years of age or older. The average household size was 2.82 and the average family size was 3.18.

In the town, the population was spread out, with 27.4% under the age of 18, 6.4% from 18 to 24, 30.0% from 25 to 44, 24.1% from 45 to 64, and 12.1% who were 65 years of age or older. The median age was 38 years. For every 100 females, there were 114.2 males. For every 100 females age 18 and over, there were 107.5 males.

The median income for a household in the town was $41,250, and the median income for a family was $48,750. Males had a median income of $30,000 versus $25,250 for females. The per capita income for the town was $19,212. About 4.2% of families and 3.7% of the population were below the poverty line, including 4.3% of those under age 18 and 12.1% of those age 65 or over.
