= Bear Creek (Mokelumne River tributary) =

Physical characteristics
- Source
  - coordinates: 38.198252°N 120.8391037°W
- Mouth
  - coordinates: 38.0432547°N 121.3860604°W

Bear Creek is a stream in San Joaquin and Calaveras counties, in the U.S. state of California. It is a tributary of the Mokelumne River.

Bear Creek was named from sightings of the grizzly bear by early settlers.

== See also ==
- List of rivers of California
