= Bear Creek, Waupaca County, Wisconsin =

Bear Creek, Wisconsin
- Town
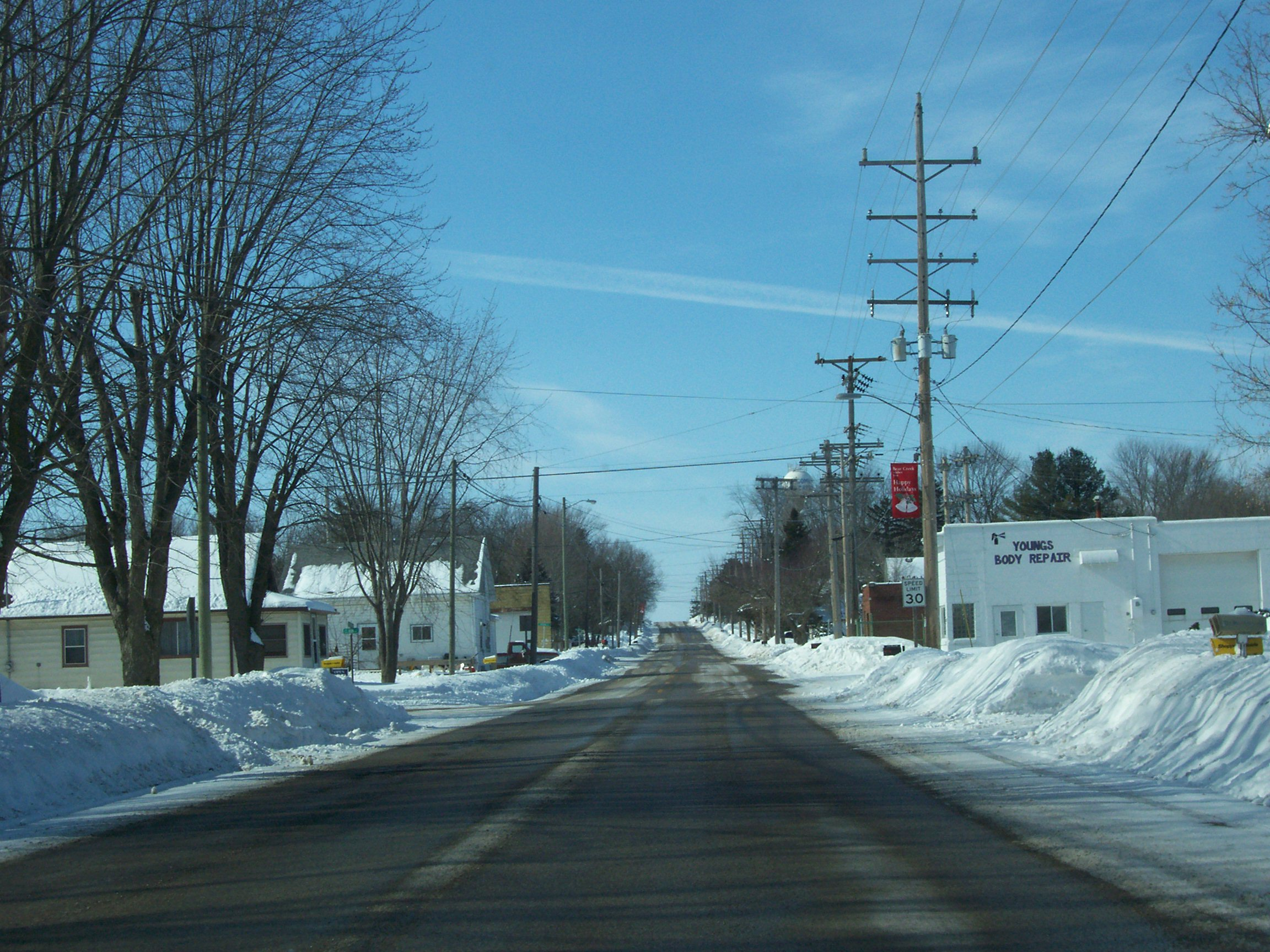
- Looking west at the unincorporated community of Bear Creek

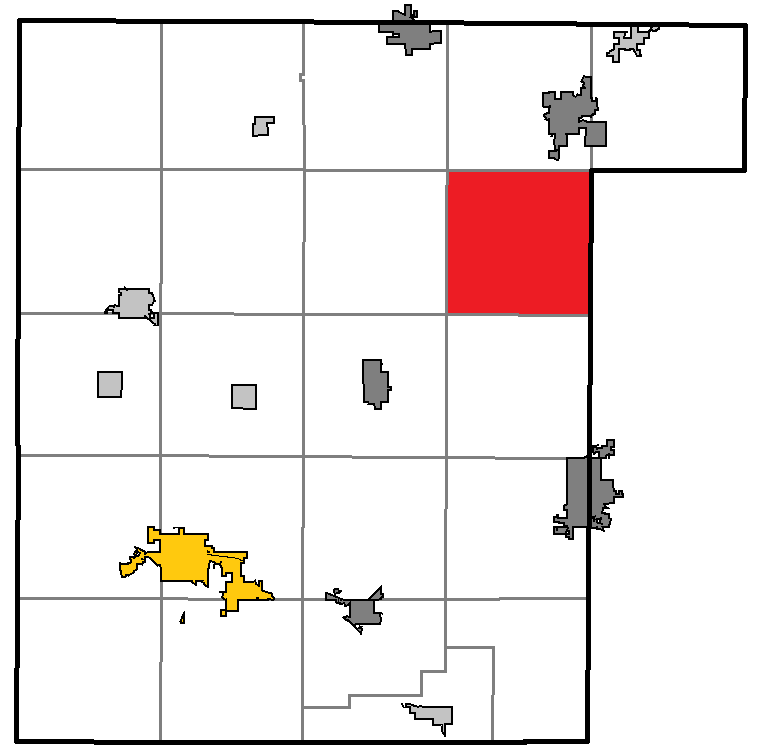
- Location of Bear Creek, within Waupaca County
- Coordinates: 44°32′25″N 88°47′49″W
- Country: United States
- State: Wisconsin
- County: Waupaca

Area
  - Total: 36.6 sq mi (94.9 km^{2})
  - Land: 36.6 sq mi (94.9 km^{2})
  - Water: 0 sq mi (0.0 km^{2})
- Elevation: 869 ft (265 m)

Population (2020)
  - Total: 748
  - Density: 20.4/sq mi (7.88/km^{2})
- Time zone: UTC-6 (Central (CST))
  - Summer (DST): UTC-5 (CDT)
- FIPS code: 55-05625
- GNIS feature ID: 1582771
- Website: https://townofbearcreek.org/

Bear Creek is a town in Waupaca County, Wisconsin, United States. The population was 748 at the 2020 census. The unincorporated communities of Bear Creek Corners and Nicholson are located in the town. The village of Bear Creek is located immediately east of the town, across the county line in Outagamie County.

== Geography ==
According to the United States Census Bureau, the town has a total area of 36.7 square miles (94.9 km^{2}), all land.

== Demographics ==
As of the census of 2000, there were 838 people, 279 households, and 234 families residing in the town. The population density was 22.9 people per square mile (8.8/km^{2}). There were 291 housing units at an average density of 7.9 per square mile (3.1/km^{2}). The racial makeup of the town was 99.52% White, 0.12% Native American, 0.12% Asian, and 0.24% from two or more races. Hispanic or Latino of any race were 0.12% of the population.

There were 279 households, out of which 38.0% had children under the age of 18 living with them, 75.6% were married couples living together, 3.9% had a female householder with no husband present, and 15.8% were non-families. 11.1% of all households were made up of individuals, and 6.5% had someone living alone who was 65 years of age or older. The average household size was 3.00 and the average family size was 3.20.

In the town, the population was spread out, with 29.1% under the age of 18, 8.2% from 18 to 24, 30.3% from 25 to 44, 19.5% from 45 to 64, and 12.9% who were 65 years of age or older. The median age was 35 years. For every 100 females, there were 109.5 males. For every 100 females age 18 and over, there were 112.1 males.

The median income for a household in the town was $45,227, and the median income for a family was $48,056. Males had a median income of $32,917 versus $21,836 for females. The per capita income for the town was $16,663. About 5.6% of families and 8.2% of the population were below the poverty line, including 6.6% of those under age 18 and 6.4% of those age 65 or over.
