= Climate of Door County, Wisconsin =

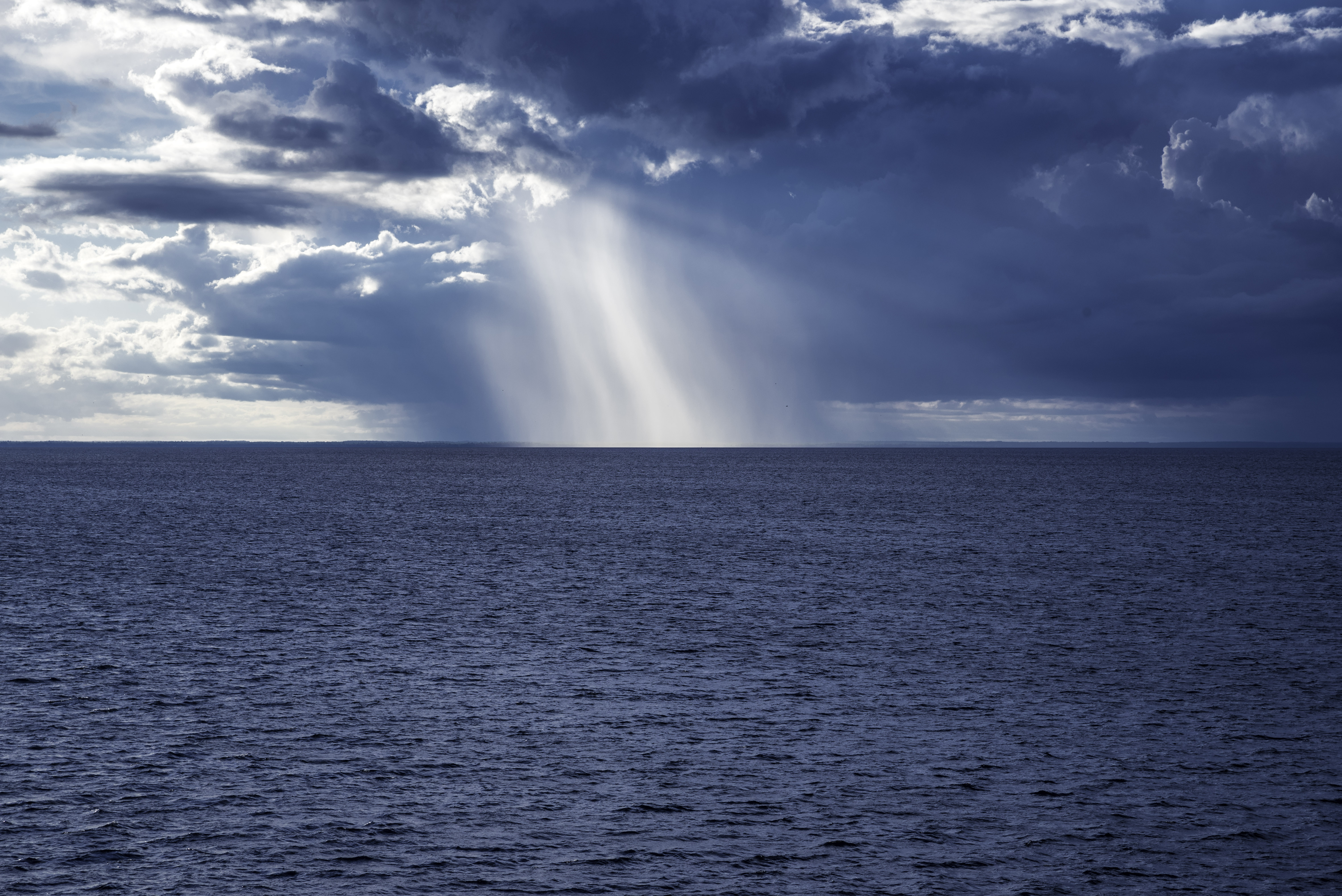
Rainfall over Lake Michigan, as seen from Newport State Park in July, 2016.

The climate of Door County, Wisconsin is tempered by Green Bay and Lake Michigan. There are fewer extremely cold days and fewer hot days than in areas of Wisconsin directly to the west. Lake waters delay the coming of spring as well as extend mild temperatures in the fall. Annual precipitation is slightly lower than elsewhere in northern Wisconsin. The county features a humid continental climate (classified as Dfb in Köppen) with warm summers and cold snowy winters.

== Charts ==
=== Peninsular Agricultural Resource Station ===
Climate data for Peninsular Agricultural Research Station north of Sturgeon Bay, 1981-2010 normals, extremes 1905-present
| Month | Jan | Feb | Mar | Apr | May | Jun | Jul | Aug | Sep | Oct | Nov | Dec | Year |
|---|---|---|---|---|---|---|---|---|---|---|---|---|---|
| Record high °F (°C) | 55 (13) | 58 (14) | 76 (24) | 85 (29) | 91 (33) | 100 (38) | 105 (41) | 102 (39) | 96 (36) | 86 (30) | 74 (23) | 60 (16) | 105 (41) |
| Mean maximum °F (°C) | 41.7 (5.4) | 44.8 (7.1) | 59.1 (15.1) | 72.6 (22.6) | 81.1 (27.3) | 87.5 (30.8) | 89.7 (32.1) | 89.0 (31.7) | 83.7 (28.7) | 73.3 (22.9) | 58.6 (14.8) | 44.9 (7.2) | 91.7 (33.2) |
| Mean daily maximum °F (°C) | 25.7 (−3.5) | 29.0 (−1.7) | 38.6 (3.7) | 51.7 (10.9) | 63.6 (17.6) | 73.5 (23.1) | 78.7 (25.9) | 77.4 (25.2) | 69.5 (20.8) | 56.1 (13.4) | 42.7 (5.9) | 30.3 (−0.9) | 53.1 (11.7) |
| Daily mean °F (°C) | 18.0 (−7.8) | 20.7 (−6.3) | 30.3 (−0.9) | 42.4 (5.8) | 53.1 (11.7) | 63.2 (17.3) | 68.7 (20.4) | 67.8 (19.9) | 60.0 (15.6) | 47.7 (8.7) | 35.9 (2.2) | 23.6 (−4.7) | 44.3 (6.8) |
| Mean daily minimum °F (°C) | 10.2 (−12.1) | 12.4 (−10.9) | 22.0 (−5.6) | 33.1 (0.6) | 42.6 (5.9) | 52.8 (11.6) | 58.6 (14.8) | 58.3 (14.6) | 50.6 (10.3) | 39.4 (4.1) | 29.0 (−1.7) | 17.0 (−8.3) | 35.5 (1.9) |
| Mean minimum °F (°C) | −8.9 (−22.7) | −6.5 (−21.4) | 2.9 (−16.2) | 20.2 (−6.6) | 30.5 (−0.8) | 39.9 (4.4) | 46.4 (8.0) | 46.0 (7.8) | 35.9 (2.2) | 27.5 (−2.5) | 15.3 (−9.3) | −1.3 (−18.5) | −13.0 (−25.0) |
| Record low °F (°C) | −29 (−34) | −29 (−34) | −23 (−31) | 2 (−17) | 20 (−7) | 29 (−2) | 36 (2) | 32 (0) | 26 (−3) | 12 (−11) | −6 (−21) | −22 (−30) | −29 (−34) |
| Average precipitation inches (mm) | 1.65 (42) | 1.25 (32) | 1.94 (49) | 2.75 (70) | 3.14 (80) | 3.64 (92) | 3.38 (86) | 3.47 (88) | 3.36 (85) | 3.05 (77) | 2.49 (63) | 1.82 (46) | 31.94 (811) |
| Average snowfall inches (cm) | 14.6 (37) | 10.6 (27) | 7.3 (19) | 2.4 (6.1) | 0.0 (0.0) | 0.0 (0.0) | 0.0 (0.0) | 0.0 (0.0) | 0.0 (0.0) | 0.1 (0.25) | 2.6 (6.6) | 13.1 (33) | 50.7 (129) |
| Average precipitation days (≥ 0.01 in) | 10.9 | 8.2 | 8.8 | 10.1 | 11.4 | 10.6 | 11.0 | 10.2 | 10.7 | 11.4 | 10.0 | 10.5 | 123.8 |
| Average snowy days (≥ 0.1 in) | 7.2 | 5.3 | 3.7 | 1.3 | 0.0 | 0.0 | 0.0 | 0.0 | 0.0 | 0.1 | 1.8 | 6.0 | 25.4 |
Source: NOAA

=== Washington Island ===
Climate data for Washington Island, Wisconsin (1991–2020 normals, extremes 1944–present)
| Month | Jan | Feb | Mar | Apr | May | Jun | Jul | Aug | Sep | Oct | Nov | Dec | Year |
|---|---|---|---|---|---|---|---|---|---|---|---|---|---|
| Record high °F (°C) | 49 (9) | 57 (14) | 71 (22) | 77 (25) | 87 (31) | 92 (33) | 94 (34) | 97 (36) | 94 (34) | 84 (29) | 71 (22) | 58 (14) | 97 (36) |
| Mean daily maximum °F (°C) | 25.7 (−3.5) | 27.5 (−2.5) | 36.2 (2.3) | 47.4 (8.6) | 59.2 (15.1) | 69.5 (20.8) | 75.6 (24.2) | 75.3 (24.1) | 67.7 (19.8) | 54.9 (12.7) | 42.4 (5.8) | 31.9 (−0.1) | 51.1 (10.6) |
| Daily mean °F (°C) | 18.2 (−7.7) | 19.1 (−7.2) | 27.9 (−2.3) | 38.6 (3.7) | 49.6 (9.8) | 59.9 (15.5) | 66.3 (19.1) | 66.2 (19.0) | 59.3 (15.2) | 47.2 (8.4) | 35.6 (2.0) | 25.6 (−3.6) | 42.8 (6.0) |
| Mean daily minimum °F (°C) | 10.8 (−11.8) | 10.7 (−11.8) | 19.6 (−6.9) | 29.8 (−1.2) | 40.0 (4.4) | 50.4 (10.2) | 56.9 (13.8) | 57.2 (14.0) | 50.8 (10.4) | 39.6 (4.2) | 28.8 (−1.8) | 19.3 (−7.1) | 34.5 (1.4) |
| Record low °F (°C) | −27 (−33) | −26 (−32) | −26 (−32) | 5 (−15) | 20 (−7) | 24 (−4) | 35 (2) | 32 (0) | 26 (−3) | 18 (−8) | 1 (−17) | −21 (−29) | −27 (−33) |
| Average precipitation inches (mm) | 1.58 (40) | 1.14 (29) | 1.73 (44) | 2.88 (73) | 2.97 (75) | 3.08 (78) | 2.84 (72) | 3.02 (77) | 3.22 (82) | 3.60 (91) | 2.34 (59) | 1.78 (45) | 30.18 (767) |
| Average snowfall inches (cm) | 15.0 (38) | 13.0 (33) | 9.5 (24) | 5.7 (14) | 0.0 (0.0) | 0.0 (0.0) | 0.0 (0.0) | 0.0 (0.0) | 0.0 (0.0) | 0.2 (0.51) | 3.4 (8.6) | 12.0 (30) | 58.8 (149) |
| Average precipitation days (≥ 0.01 in) | 10.0 | 7.7 | 7.8 | 9.6 | 11.4 | 10.3 | 9.7 | 9.3 | 9.8 | 11.7 | 9.3 | 9.7 | 116.3 |
| Average snowy days (≥ 0.1 in) | 8.7 | 6.9 | 4.9 | 2.4 | 0.1 | 0.0 | 0.0 | 0.0 | 0.0 | 0.2 | 2.6 | 6.5 | 32.3 |
Source: NOAA

== Lake breeze ==
On hot summer days, cool lake breezes start in around noon and grow more intense by mid-afternoon. This effect can be noticed at the shoreline and around a mile or so inland. Although lake breezes are capable of penetrating considerably further inland, they are able to heat up quickly after passing onto land. After as little as a mile of travel inland, they may be nearly as warm as the air they push away. When a lake breeze encounters an inward curving shoreline, such as at Sister Bay, the breeze becomes more intense. The curve of the shore guides the breezes from opposing sides of the bay and makes them converge upon each other at the middle.

== Records and weather events ==
The most one-day rainfall at the Peninsular Agricultural Research Station was 4.57 inches (116 mm), recorded on August 25, 1910. Lightning damaged multiple areas over a period of ten hours. The electric generator for Sturgeon Bay was shut down as a precaution to preserve the equipment. One man died in his burning barn while trying to save his horses. A train on the Ahnapee and Western Railroad failed to pass through after culverts were found washed out between Forestville and Maplewood.

The warmest maximum temperature at the Peninsular Agricultural Research Station was 105 °F (41 °C) on July 9, 1936. Street thermometers in Sturgeon Bay in the shade reached 108 °F (42 °C), and storm clouds appeared in the west but did not give rain. It was part of a week-long hot and dry spell. County residents, along with hundreds of tourists and seasonal dwellers took time out to find a spot cool enough for comfort. The hot and dry weather damaged the already-poor cherry crop, with typical yields expected at 5 or 6 percent of normal. One processing plant remained shut down for the season, and another opted to open at a limited scale.

Records from Sturgeon Bay in the months prior to the 1871 Peshtigo fire indicate the area suffered from prolonged and abnormal dry conditions beginning in June.

During a period of drought, the northwest corner of Chambers Island burned in a forest and bush fire on July 10, 1963. Nearly 40 acres were burned, which was thought to be caused by the careless use of a campfire. It took seven hours to put out, using green boughs to beat the fire, back pack tanks, and a water pump based in the bay. The county had only 4.24 inches of rain during April, May, and June, compared to the normal figure of 8.90 inches. Only 0.18 inches had fallen at the Agricultural Research Station since the beginning of July, although some parts of the county had received more rain.

The coldest minimum temperature at the Peninsular Agricultural Research Station was −29 °F (−34 °C), which was recorded on five occasions: February 10, 1912, February 10, 1944, February 12, 197, February 9, 1933, and January 17, 1982. Out of the five occasions, February 9, 1933, had the coldest maximum temperature at −5 °F (−21 °C), which was reached following the low of −29 °F (−34 °C) at 7:00 AM. The coldest maximum temperature at the station was −20 °F (−29 °C) on January 16, 1982.

On May 6–7th, 1960, the Peninsular Agricultural Research Station recorded 2.35 inches (60 mm) of rain over 48 hours. 1.85 inches (47 mm) was recorded at the station in Kewaunee. On May 7, the earthen portion of Forestville Dam failed due to the rain. Over a few minutes starting at approximately 7:30 AM, a 35–foot hole opened on the east side of the dam, and within an hour a 15–foot hole opened on the west side. South of the dam, County Trunk J was closed from 9:00 AM until late afternoon due to water pouring over the county trunk. Most of the millpond was drained, and some of the muck was exposed in the center. Flooding from heavy rains also closed Highway 57. Following this, the highway was built up. Heavy rains during May 1979 flooded a town road north of Highway 57, but not the highway itself. The Ahnapee River also flooded in September 1975 and nearly caused another dam failure. Floods on the Ahnapee are expected to reoccur approximately every 30 years.

On January 7, 1967, Washington Island received 17 inches (430 mm) of snow, setting the county record for the greatest one-day snowfall. 17 inches (430 mm) of snow again fell on April 14, 2018, this time at the Peninsular Agricultural Research Station.

On September 22, 1971, a blizzard forced about 620 Southern Door School District students to stay overnight in their school buildings. Some parents were able get their children home in the evening, many using snowmobiles. Busses sent the students home after breakfast the next day.

Ice accumulation during the winter of 2014 was the highest ever recorded on Lake Michigan.

Hail over two inches in diameter has been reported four times in the county. On July 28, 1912, hail the size of a man's two fists was reported near Ellison Bay. On June 27, 1978, a hailstorm hit an area from Sister Bay to Ellison Bay. Tennis-ball sized hail was reported. On September 26, 1998, 2.75 inch hail was reported in Baileys Harbor. On August 9, 2001, 3 inch hail was reported one mile south of Sturgeon Bay.

On June 4, 1955, two were killed by lightning while in a fishing boat about 100 feet from the shore in Sturgeon Bay.

=== Tornadoes ===
Four tornadoes touched down between 1844 and 1880, and thirteen from 1950 to 1989, but there were no fatalities in any of them. Two crossed the Door-Kewaunee county line. From 1989 to 2019, there were 3 additional tornadoes, including the F3 "Door County tornado" which hit Egg Harbor in 1998. Additionally there were at least 11 waterspouts between 1950 and 2019.

| Date of Tornado | Time | F-Scale | Length | Width (yards) |
|---|---|---|---|---|
| July 1, 1956 | 12:05 PM CST | F2 | 10.6 miles | 50 yards |
| August 16, 1959 | ? PM CST | ? | ? | ? |
| August 2, 1960 | 8:00 PM CST | ? | ? | ? |
| August 2, 1960 | 8:00 PM CST | ? | ? | ? |
| July 25, 1966 | 6:20 PM CST | F0 | 2 miles | 17 yards |
| April 22, 1970 | 9:10 PM CST | F2 | 2.3 miles | 500 yards |
| April 22, 1970 | 9:30 PM CST | F2 | 4.3 miles | 500 yards |
| August 10, 1971 | ? AM CDT | ? | ? | ? |
| July 12, 1973 | 7:30 AM CST | F1 | 0 miles | 100 yards |
| July 1, 1974 | 7:30 AM CST | F1 | 0 miles | 100 yards |
| September 3, 1975 | 6:00 AM CST | ? | ? | ? |
| July 30, 1976 | 5:00 PM CST | ? | ? | about 3 yards |
| June 8, 1985 | 8:00 PM CST | F2 | 5 miles | 150 yards |
| August 23, 1998 | 5:30 PM CST | F3 | 5.1 miles | 1,300 yards |
| July 13, 2000 | 2:55 PM CST | F0 | 0.1 miles | 50 yards |
| June 18, 2006 | 4:43 PM CST | F0 | N/A | N/A |

== Weather monitoring ==
Weather in the county is reported by WXN69 (FM 162.425), the NOAA weather radio station in Sister Bay. Green Bay and Lake Michigan ice thickness reports and forecasts are produced by NOAA.

Weather monitors in the county report terrestrial and marine weather conditions:

| Location | Name and hyperlink | Operator | Service |
|---|---|---|---|
| Weather radar for Door County | Weather Radar for Door County | National Weather Service | |
| Lake Michigan and Green Bay | Surface Water Temperature | Seagull (part of IOOS) | marine |
| Sturgeon Bay, Door County Cherryland Airport | Door County Cherryland Airport (KSUE) | National Weather Service Central Region | terrestrial |
| Clay Banks | GHCND:USC00472851 Daily Summaries; NOWData products such as climate normals | National Weather Service Central Region | terrestrial |
| Sevestapol, Peninsular Agricultural Research Station | GHCND:USC00478267 Daily Summaries; NOWData products such as climate normals | National Weather Service Central Region | terrestrial |
| Baileys Harbor | GHCND:US1WIDR0011 Daily Summaries | National Weather Service Central Region | terrestrial |
| Ephraim | GHCND:USC00472626 Daily Summaries; NOWData products such as climate normals | National Weather Service Central Region | terrestrial |
| Sister Bay | GHCND:US1WIDR0006 Daily Summaries | National Weather Service Central Region | terrestrial |
| Ellison Bay | GHCND:US1WIDR0005 Daily Summaries | National Weather Service Central Region | terrestrial |
| Washington Island | GHCND:USC00478905 Daily Summaries; NOWData products such as climate normals | National Weather Service Central Region | terrestrial |
| Northport Pier | Station NPDW3 | National Weather Service Central Region | marine |
| Sister Bay Yacht Works | Station SYWW3 | National Weather Service Central Region | marine |
| Sturgeon Bay, Coast Guard Station | Station 0Y2W3 | National Weather Service Central Region | marine |
| Chambers Island | Station CBRW3 | National Weather Service Central Region | marine |
| South Green Bay Buoy (in county waters) | Station 45014 - GB17 | University of Wisconsin–Milwaukee | marine |
| Nasewaupee | Nasewaupee / S. Door County station | Michigan State University | terrestrial |
| Town of Sturgeon Bay | Sturgeon Bay / Southern Door station | Michigan State University | terrestrial |
| Sevastapol | Sturgeon Bay station | Michigan State University | terrestrial |
| Jacksonport | West Jacksonport station | Michigan State University | terrestrial |
| Egg Harbor | Egg Harbor station | Michigan State University | terrestrial |
| Liberty Grove | Sister Bay / Liberty Grove station | Michigan State University | terrestrial |
| Brussels | Brussels, Chaudoir's Dock County Park | Door County Parks Department | webcam |
| Gills Rock | Gills Rock | private | webcam |
| Ephraim | Pine Grove Resort, Ephraim | private | webcam |
| Ephraim, dock | Ephraim Yacht Club | private | webcam |
| Fish Creek | Fish Creek Harbor | private | webcam |
| Cana Island | Cana Island | Door County Parks Department | webcam |
| Egg Harbor | Egg Harbor Lodge | private | webcam |
| Sturgeon Bay Marina | Sturgeon Bay Marina | private | webcam |
| Bay View Bridge | Bay View Bridge | private | webcam |
| Sturgeon Bay Bridge | Sturgeon Bay Bridge | private | webcam |
| Northport and Washington Island | Northport and Washington Island webcam | private | webcam |

== See also ==
- Pollution in Door County, Wisconsin § Air
- Rock Island State Park (Wisconsin) § Climate
- Washington Island (Wisconsin) § Climate
- Porte des Morts § Climate
- Newport State Park § Climate
- Sturgeon Bay, Wisconsin § Climate
- Forestville, Wisconsin § Climate

=== Climate of nearby locations ===
To the south

- Manitowoc, Wisconsin § Climate
- Climate of Milwaukee
- Climate of Chicago

To the southwest

- Green Bay, Wisconsin § Climate
- Madison, Wisconsin § Climate

To the west

- Menominee, Michigan § Climate
- Wausau, Wisconsin § Climate
- Climate of Minneapolis–Saint Paul

To the north

- Escanaba, Michigan § Climate
- Manistique, Michigan § Climate

To the northeast

- Beaver Island (Lake Michigan) § Climate

To the east

- Frankfort, Michigan § Climate
- Traverse City, Michigan § Climate

To the southeast

- Manistee, Michigan § Climate

Broader areas

- Geography of Wisconsin § Climate
- Upper Peninsula of Michigan § Climate
- Wisconsin tornado events (list by date)
- Lake Michigan § Hydrology
