= Frankfort Land Company House =

Historic house in Michigan, United States

- U.S. National Register of Historic Places
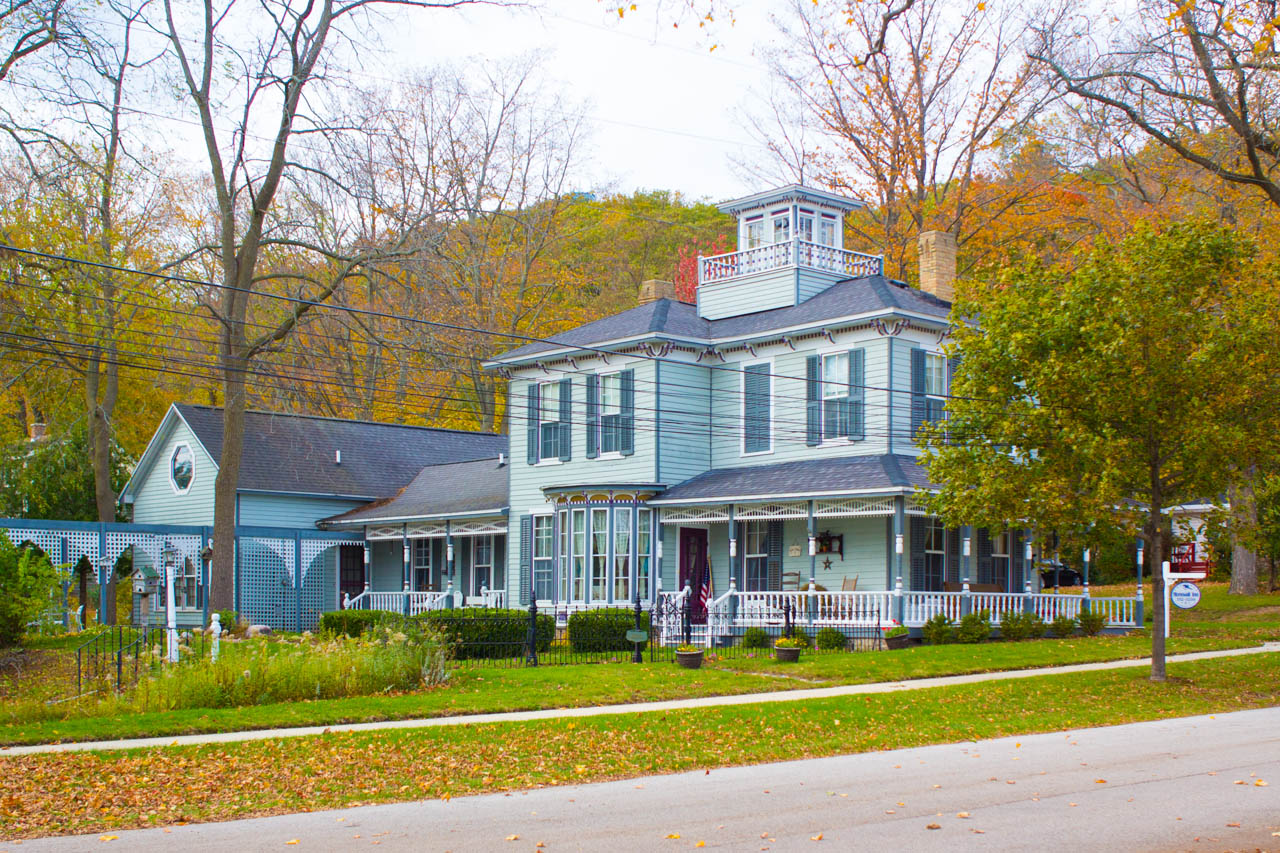

- Location within Michigan Location within the United States
- Interactive map
- Location: 428 Leelanau St., Frankfort, Michigan, United States
- Coordinates: 44°38′4″N 86°14′16″W
- Area: less than one acre
- Built: 1867
- Architectural style: Italianate
- NRHP reference No.: 95000452
- Added to NRHP: April 14, 1995

The Frankfort Land Company House, also known as the John Bockoven House, is a single family house located at 428 Leelanau Street in Frankfort, Michigan, United States. It was listed on the National Register of Historic Places in 1995. It currently operates as the Stonewall Inn B & B.

== History ==
The Frankfort Land Company began the development of the town of Frankfort in 1859. In the 1860s (likely 1867, but perhaps as early as 1860), they constructed this house to provide a residence for company officials living on site. However, the existence of the house—the first stylish building constructed in the town—also advertised the confidence the Land Company had in the potential and economic vitality of Frankfort.

At some point in the 1870s, the house was sold to Hugh and Emily Marsh. They lived there until 1881, when Stephan Grubbs purchased it. He sold the house in 1885 to Elvira Bates, who moved in with Anna Alice Little, the daughter of a good friend. Anna married Henry Hills in 1885, and continued living in the house with her family and Elvira Bates. In 1888, Elvira deeded the house to Anna. Elvira died in 1900, and the Hills family moved to Grand Rapids in 1905. They rented the house for ten years.

In 1915, the house was purchased by John J. and Caroline Bockoven of Grand Rapids as a summer retreat. Their son, John C. Bockoven, soon married and started a family, and continued to use the house, primarily in the summer. The family used the house until John C. Bockoven died; after which usage tapered off, ceasing entirely in about 1973. The house lay vacant until 1987, when John C. Bockoven Jr sold it at auction to a local antiques dealer, Ed Wichert. Edwin Wichert and his wife Mary Louise first sold most of the antiques remaining inside and bought out their limited partners so they could move in themselves. Starting with raising the foundation and taking apart the root cellar and horse's buggy garage, the Wicherts began restoring the house in 1993, leaving the style intact, but creating a liveable space for the proprietors separate from guests and building a carriage house around back. A variance was required to surround the courtyard with wrought-iron fencing and in 1996 a seal from the Department of Interior was placed outside the front entrance. The Bed & Breakfast was named for the original business that developed the Betsy Bay area, selling parcels to pioneers who wanted to homestead, while quietly offering midwife services to the families of sixty-nine babies delivered in the front parlor. The Wichert family opened it as the "Frankfort Land Co. Bed & Breakfast Inn." The Frankfort Land Company house had dropped off the map of US Census after the 1970s. The Wichert family sold the house in 2001, the new owners then changed the name to the "Stonewall Inn B & B."

== Description ==
The Frankfort Land Company House is one of the best surviving examples of Italianate architecture in Benzie County. It is a two-story, T-shaped, hip roof structure with a single-story gable roof wing. Atop the main section is a square, hip roof belvedere. Decorative brackets are tucked under the eaves. The windows are long and narrow four-over-four double-hung type, framed with the original functional shutters. There is a bay window on one side.
