= Navigation Structures at Frankfort Harbor =

Navigation structures in Michigan, United States

- U.S. National Register of Historic Places
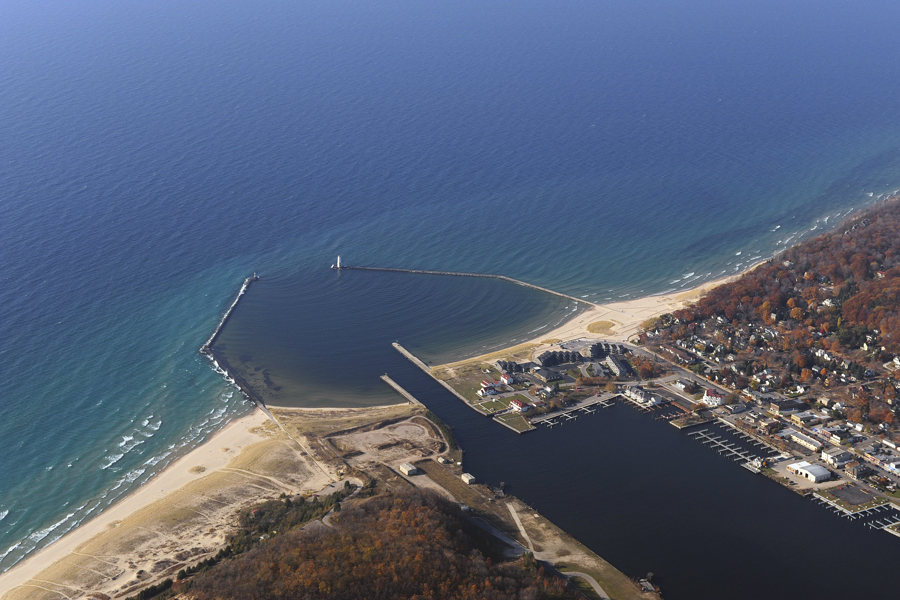

- Location within Michigan Location within the United States
- Interactive map
- Location: 2nd St., Frankfort, Michigan
- Coordinates: 44°37′49″N 86°14′52″W
- Area: 2.4 acres (0.97 ha)
- Built: 1867
- Architect: Brigadier General T.J. Cram, Whitwood and Hubell
- Architectural style: Utilitarian
- NRHP reference No.: 97000973
- Added to NRHP: September 12, 1997

The Navigation Structures at Frankfort Harbor are a collection of breakwaters, piers, and other structures in Lake Michigan located at the foot of Second Street in Frankfort, Michigan. They were listed on the National Register of Historic Places in 1997.

== History ==
In 1854, running from a violent storm, Buffalo captain George Tifft ran his schooner over a sandbar and into the protection of Lake Betsie. After the storm, while digging back out, Tifft took the opportunity to explore the area and realized it was an ideal location for a harbor. Soon after Tifft brought word of his discovery back home, a number of people began purchasing property around the lake. In 1859, private interests constructed two short piers and dredged out a channel between them, connecting Betsie Lake to Lake Michigan.

The harbor quickly became a popular refuge, and in 1867, Congress directed the Army Corps of Engineers to begin improvements on the harbor. A new channel was cut, and by 1873 two new wooden piers had been constructed and a beacon installed at the pierhead. As the harbor became more utilized, the piers were extended in 1884 and again in 1896, and a new lighthouse (the Frankfort Light, also on the National Register of Historic Places) was installed on the north pier in 1912.

In 1928, construction began on a pair of concrete breakwaters at the harbor entrance. Construction was complete by 1932. With the earlier piers now rendered obsolete, plans were made to shorten them, and the 1912 lighthouse was removed from the north pier and relocated at the head of the north breakwater. In 1934 the remaining stub piers were capped with concrete. Piecemeal repairs were done on sections of the piers in the 1950s and 60s.

== Description ==
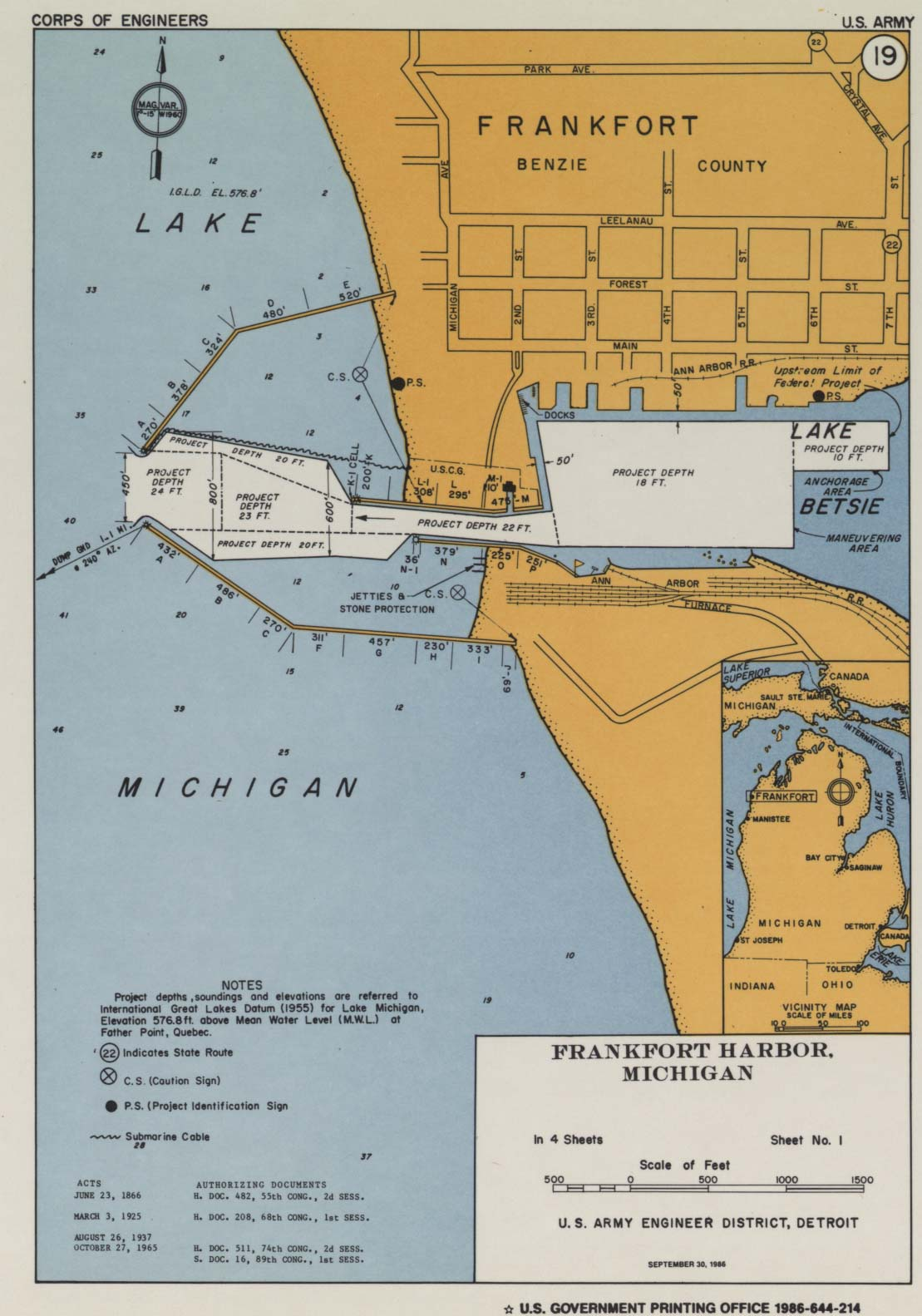
Frankfort MI harbor map

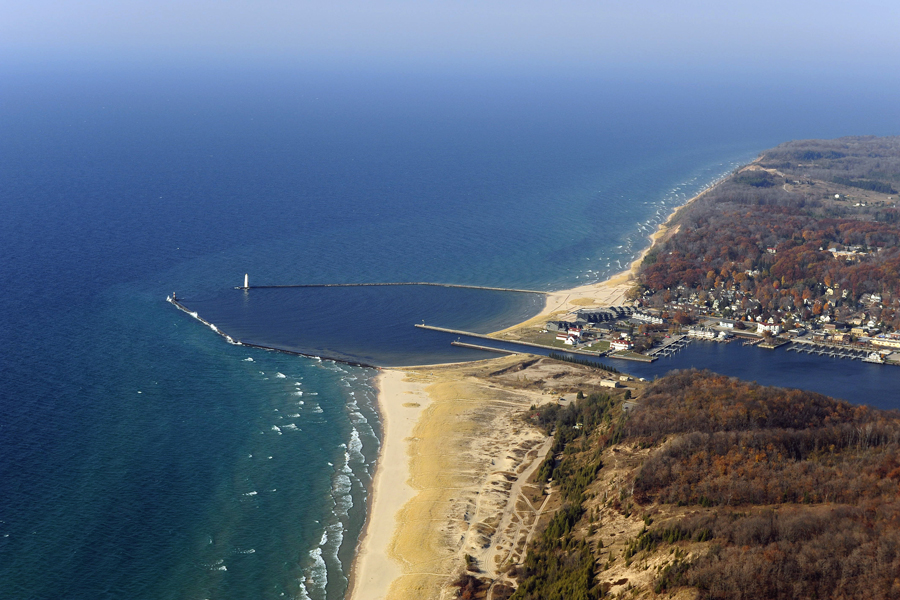
Aerial view

The exterior basin of the Frankfort Harbor is formed by two breakwaters, 450 feet (140 m) apart at the outer ends. The main section of the north breakwater is 972 feet (296 m) long, with a shore connector of 1,000 feet (300 m). The main section of the south breakwater is 1,188 feet (362 m) long, with a shore connector of 1,400 feet (430 m). Two stub piers line the entrance to the harbor within the breakwaters.

The piers are stone-filled timber cribs, 20 feet (6.1 m) wide, with the exception of the shoreward portion of the south pier, which is constructed of wooden pilings filled with sand. The original piers were wrapped in sheet piling in the 1950s-60s, and the entire structure capped in concrete; the piers now range from 27 feet (8.2 m) to 33 feet (10 m) wide. The lakeward sections of the breakwaters are stone-filled concrete, with riprap piled against the outside. The shoreward sections are wood pilings filled with stone and capped with concrete. The breakwaters range from 14 feet (4.3 m) to 17 feet (5.2 m) wide.

The Frankfort North Breakwater Light is located on the head of the north breakwater. It is a square steel pyramidal tower standing 44 feet (13 m) atop a 25 feet (7.6 m) tall square steel base.
