= Climate of Milwaukee =

Milwaukee has a humid continental climate (Köppen climate classification Dfa), with four distinct seasons and wide variations in temperature and precipitation in short periods of time. The city's climate is also strongly influenced by nearby Lake Michigan, which creates two varying climates within the Milwaukee area. The urban heat island effect also plays a role in the city's climate, insulating it from winter cold, but keeping it cooler in spring and summer.

== Monthly normals and record temperatures ==
Climate data for Milwaukee (Mitchell International Airport), 1991–2020 normals, (Note: Mean monthly maxima and minima (i.e. the expected highest and lowest temperature readings at any point during the year or given month) calculated based on data at said location from 1991 to 2020.) extremes 1871–present (Note: Records kept January 1871 to February 1941 at the Weather Bureau Office and at General Mitchell Int'l since March 1941. For more information, see Threadex)
| Month | Jan | Feb | Mar | Apr | May | Jun | Jul | Aug | Sep | Oct | Nov | Dec | Year |
|---|---|---|---|---|---|---|---|---|---|---|---|---|---|
| Record high °F (°C) | 63 (17) | 74 (23) | 84 (29) | 91 (33) | 95 (35) | 104 (40) | 105 (41) | 103 (39) | 99 (37) | 89 (32) | 77 (25) | 68 (20) | 105 (41) |
| Mean maximum °F (°C) | 50.5 (10.3) | 52.8 (11.6) | 67.1 (19.5) | 79.5 (26.4) | 85.8 (29.9) | 92.0 (33.3) | 93.4 (34.1) | 91.7 (33.2) | 88.1 (31.2) | 79.9 (26.6) | 65.5 (18.6) | 53.4 (11.9) | 95.0 (35.0) |
| Mean daily maximum °F (°C) | 30.9 (−0.6) | 34.2 (1.2) | 44.2 (6.8) | 54.7 (12.6) | 66.5 (19.2) | 76.8 (24.9) | 81.9 (27.7) | 80.3 (26.8) | 73.5 (23.1) | 61.3 (16.3) | 47.8 (8.8) | 36.1 (2.3) | 57.3 (14.1) |
| Daily mean °F (°C) | 24.0 (−4.4) | 27.1 (−2.7) | 36.4 (2.4) | 46.3 (7.9) | 57.1 (13.9) | 67.6 (19.8) | 73.3 (22.9) | 72.3 (22.4) | 65.0 (18.3) | 53.0 (11.7) | 40.4 (4.7) | 29.5 (−1.4) | 49.3 (9.6) |
| Mean daily minimum °F (°C) | 17.2 (−8.2) | 20.0 (−6.7) | 28.7 (−1.8) | 37.8 (3.2) | 47.8 (8.8) | 58.4 (14.7) | 64.7 (18.2) | 64.2 (17.9) | 56.4 (13.6) | 44.7 (7.1) | 33.1 (0.6) | 23.0 (−5.0) | 41.3 (5.2) |
| Mean minimum °F (°C) | −4.5 (−20.3) | 1.0 (−17.2) | 10.6 (−11.9) | 25.6 (−3.6) | 36.3 (2.4) | 45.7 (7.6) | 54.7 (12.6) | 55.0 (12.8) | 42.3 (5.7) | 30.6 (−0.8) | 17.9 (−7.8) | 3.2 (−16.0) | −7.9 (−22.2) |
| Record low °F (°C) | −26 (−32) | −26 (−32) | −10 (−23) | 12 (−11) | 21 (−6) | 33 (1) | 40 (4) | 42 (6) | 28 (−2) | 15 (−9) | −14 (−26) | −22 (−30) | −26 (−32) |
| Average precipitation inches (mm) | 1.79 (45) | 1.69 (43) | 2.20 (56) | 3.86 (98) | 3.54 (90) | 4.38 (111) | 3.40 (86) | 3.65 (93) | 3.16 (80) | 2.78 (71) | 2.24 (57) | 1.88 (48) | 34.57 (878) |
| Average snowfall inches (cm) | 14.9 (38) | 11.8 (30) | 6.7 (17) | 2.1 (5.3) | 0.0 (0.0) | 0.0 (0.0) | 0.0 (0.0) | 0.0 (0.0) | 0.0 (0.0) | 0.3 (0.76) | 2.5 (6.4) | 10.4 (26) | 48.7 (124) |
| Average extreme snow depth inches (cm) | 8.6 (22) | 7.1 (18) | 5.3 (13) | 0.9 (2.3) | 0.0 (0.0) | 0.0 (0.0) | 0.0 (0.0) | 0.0 (0.0) | 0.0 (0.0) | 0.1 (0.25) | 1.1 (2.8) | 5.6 (14) | 12.5 (32) |
| Average precipitation days (≥ 0.01 in) | 11.4 | 10.0 | 10.7 | 12.2 | 11.7 | 11.1 | 9.5 | 9.5 | 8.6 | 10.3 | 10.2 | 10.3 | 125.5 |
| Average snowy days (≥ 0.1 in) | 10.0 | 8.1 | 5.0 | 1.8 | 0.0 | 0.0 | 0.0 | 0.0 | 0.0 | 0.3 | 2.6 | 7.3 | 35.1 |
| Average relative humidity (%) | 72.3 | 71.9 | 71.4 | 68.5 | 68.5 | 69.7 | 71.5 | 74.9 | 75.4 | 72.5 | 74.5 | 75.9 | 72.3 |
| Average dew point °F (°C) | 11.7 (−11.3) | 15.4 (−9.2) | 24.6 (−4.1) | 33.6 (0.9) | 43.7 (6.5) | 54.3 (12.4) | 60.6 (15.9) | 60.4 (15.8) | 53.4 (11.9) | 41.4 (5.2) | 30.4 (−0.9) | 18.3 (−7.6) | 37.3 (3.0) |
| Mean monthly sunshine hours | 140.2 | 151.5 | 185.4 | 213.5 | 275.5 | 304.5 | 321.1 | 281.2 | 215.1 | 178.0 | 112.8 | 104.8 | 2,483.6 |
| Percentage possible sunshine | 48 | 51 | 50 | 53 | 61 | 66 | 69 | 65 | 57 | 52 | 38 | 37 | 56 |
| Average ultraviolet index | 1 | 2 | 4 | 5 | 7 | 8 | 8 | 8 | 6 | 3 | 2 | 1 | 5 |
Source 1: NOAA (relative humidity, dew point, and sun 1961–1990)
Source 2: Weather Atlas

Climate data for Milwaukee
| Month | Jan | Feb | Mar | Apr | May | Jun | Jul | Aug | Sep | Oct | Nov | Dec | Year |
|---|---|---|---|---|---|---|---|---|---|---|---|---|---|
| Average sea temperature °F (°C) | 37.5 (3.0) | 36.0 (2.2) | 36.2 (2.4) | 38.2 (3.4) | 40.8 (4.9) | 53.3 (11.8) | 67.9 (19.9) | 71.9 (22.2) | 66.9 (19.4) | 54.9 (12.8) | 46.9 (8.3) | 40.1 (4.5) | 49.2 (9.6) |
Source: Weather Atlas

== Temperatures ==
Milwaukee has a continental climate with wide variations in temperatures over short periods, especially in spring and autumn. The warmest month is July, when the average high temperature is 81 °F (27 °C), and the overnight low is 63 °F (17 °C). The coldest month is January, when the average high temperature is only 28 °F (-2 °C). Low temperatures in January average 16°F (-8°C).

Monthly average temperatures in Milwaukee, Wisconsin
| Month | Jan | Feb | Mar | Apr | May | Jun | Jul | Aug | Sep | Oct | Nov | Dec |
|---|---|---|---|---|---|---|---|---|---|---|---|---|
| High (°F) | 28 | 33 | 43 | 54 | 66 | 76 | 81 | 79 | 72 | 60 | 46 | 33 |
| °C | -2 | 1 | 6 | 12 | 19 | 25 | 27 | 26 | 22 | 15 | 8 | 1 |
| Low (°F) | 13 | 18 | 27 | 36 | 46 | 56 | 63 | 62 | 54 | 43 | 31 | 19 |
| °C | -11 | -8 | -3 | 2 | 8 | 13 | 17 | 17 | 12 | 6 | -1 | -7 |

The highest temperature ever recorded in Milwaukee is 105 °F (41 °C) on July 24, 1935 and the coldest temperature is -26 °F (-32 °C), on both January 17, 1982 and February 4, 1996. The former occasion is referred to as "Cold Sunday", because of the extreme cold felt in many locations in the United States on that day.

Record High and Low Temperatures by month at Milwaukee, Wisconsin
| Month | Jan | Feb | Mar | Apr | May | Jun | Jul | Aug | Sep | Oct | Nov | Dec |
|---|---|---|---|---|---|---|---|---|---|---|---|---|
| Record High (°F) | 63 | 71 | 84 | 91 | 95 | 104 | 105 | 103 | 99 | 89 | 77 | 68 |
| °C | 17 | 20 | 28 | 33 | 34 | 40 | 41 | 39 | 37 | 32 | 25 | 20 |
| Record Low (°F) | -26 | -26 | -10 | 12 | 21 | 33 | 40 | 41 | 28 | 15 | -14 | -20 |
| °C | -32 | -32 | -23 | -11 | -6 | 1 | 4 | 5 | -2 | -8 | -20 | -29 |

== Precipitation ==
Milwaukee has varied precipitation throughout the year, in both type and amount. Although rain can fall all year round, it is rare during winter months. Snow falls from late November until early March, although snow can fall as early as late September or as late as the end of May. During the transition into and out of winter, various mixed forms of precipitation can occur, such as sleet, ice, and freezing rain. Ice storms are uncommon. These types of precipitation tend to occur mainly in November and March.

An average year in Milwaukee sees 34.81 inches (884.2 mm) of precipitation, with a yearly average snowfall of 52.4 inches (133 cm). The city receives more snowfall than cities even slightly inland because of lake-effect snow produced by Lake Michigan. As Milwaukee lies on the western shore of Lake Michigan, east winds, although not the prevailing wind direction in the Midwest, occur when panhandle hook systems move northeast bringing heavier snowfall on the Milwaukee side of the lake. Milwaukee receives far less snow than cities on the eastern shore of the lake, which receive extra snowfall when more common west or north-west winds blow.

The wettest month of the year is August, with an average 4.03 inches (102 mm) of precipitation, mainly as rainfall. Long-duration rains are uncommon in summer, usually occurring only in April or October. Thunderstorms are the main precipitation events from May until September, and Milwaukee experiences an extended tornado season that lasts from late March until early June, however, severe weather and tornadoes are more frequent inland to the west. The driest month is February, when only 1.65 inches (41.9 mm) of precipitation falls, almost entirely as light, low moisture content snow resulting from the Alberta clipper type system when cold, dry air masses dominate.

Monthly average precipitation in Milwaukee, Wisconsin
| Month | Jan | Feb | Mar | Apr | May | Jun | Jul | Aug | Sep | Oct | Nov | Dec |
|---|---|---|---|---|---|---|---|---|---|---|---|---|
| Inches | 1.86 | 1.65 | 2.59 | 3.78 | 3.06 | 3.56 | 3.58 | 4.03 | 3.30 | 2.49 | 2.70 | 2.22 |
| Millimeters | 47.0 | 41.9 | 65.8 | 96.0 | 77.7 | 90.4 | 90.9 | 102.0 | 83.8 | 63.2 | 68.6 | 56.4 |
| Snowfall (in) | 13.9 | 9.3 | 8.3 | 1.9 | 0.1 | 0 | 0 | 0 | 0 | 0.2 | 3.0 | 10.6 |

== See also ==
- Geography of Wisconsin § Climate
- Climate of Door County, Wisconsin
- Green Bay, Wisconsin § Climate
- Manitowoc, Wisconsin § Climate
- Madison, Wisconsin § Climate
- Climate of Chicago
- Lake Michigan § Hydrology
