= Point Betsie Light =

Lighthouse in Michigan, United States

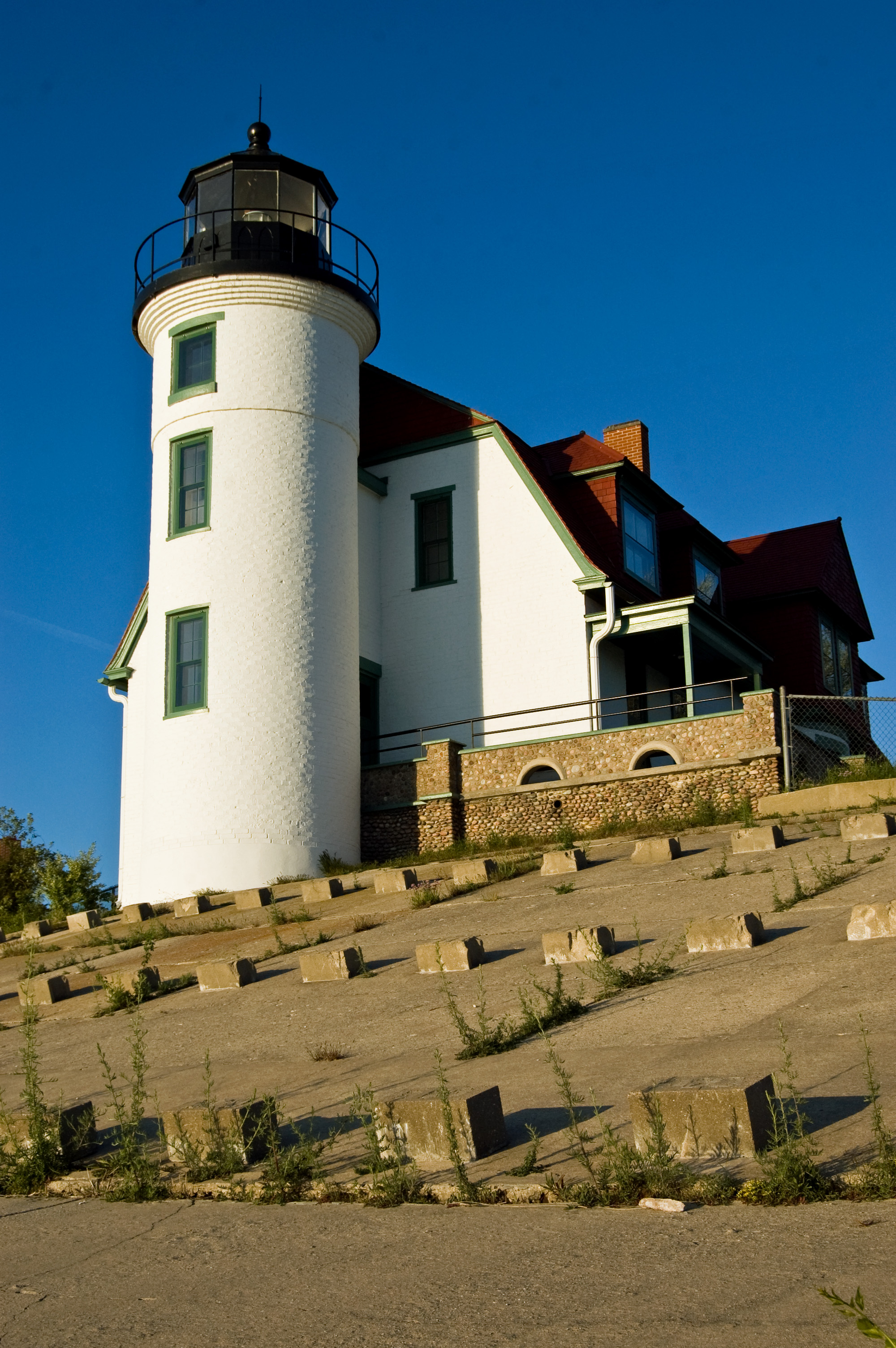
- Location: North of Frankfort, Michigan
- Coordinates: 44.6913°N 86.2552°W

Tower
- Constructed: 1858
- Foundation: Concrete
- Construction: Cream City brick
- Automated: April 1983
- Height: 37 feet (11 m)
- Shape: Cylindrical
- Markings: White tower/Red roof
- Heritage: National Register of Historic Places listed place

Light
- First lit: 1859
- Focal height: 52 feet (16 m)
- Lens: 4th order Fresnel Lens (original), VRB-25 (1996-2022), VLB-44 (current)
- Range: 26 kilometres (16 mi)
- Characteristic: Fl W 10s
- Point Betsie Light Station
- U.S. National Register of Historic Places
- Michigan State Historic Site
- Location: Point Betsie, Frankfort, Michigan
- Area: 2 acres (0.81 ha)
- Built: 1858
- MPS: U.S. Coast Guard Lighthouses and Light Stations on the Great Lakes TR
- NRHP reference No.: 84001375
- Added to NRHP: July 19, 1984

Point Betsie Light is located on the northeast shore of Lake Michigan — at the southern entrance to the Manitou Passage — north of Frankfort in Benzie County in Northern Michigan. Construction began in 1854, but it was not completed until 1858, and began service in the shipping season of 1859. The lighthouse cost $5,000 to build. In 1875, a life saving station was built for $3,000.

== History ==
The light was equipped with a Fourth Order Fresnel lens /freɪˈnɛl/ with bullseye, visible for 23.9 nautical miles; 44.3 kilometres (27.5 mi), because of the high placement of the tower (focal plane of 52.5 feet (16.0 m)) and the efficacy of the lens design. The Fresnel Lens was removed in 1996, and was stored for years at Sleeping Bear Dunes National Lakeshore. It has since been returned to the original site and sits, non-operational, inside the lighthouse where visitors can see its glass combination of engineering and artistry at close proximity.

The cylindrical tower is 39 feet (12 m) tall, but sits on a dune. It is attached to the Lighthouse keepers house, which was upgraded to an attractive gambrel roof design.

This was one of the earliest Life Saving Stations, and was run under the auspices of the U.S. Life-Saving Service. In 1910 the United States Lighthouse Board was reconstituted as the U.S. Lighthouse Service. In 1939 these agencies were merged under the control of the U.S. Coast Guard.

Prior to being automated in 1983, the 'wickies' operated the light for 106 years. This was the last staffed lighthouse on Lake Michigan and the last Michigan lighthouse to lose its keeper. The light is now a Vega VRB-25 system. The new optic would be visible for a range of 13 to 19 nautical miles; 24 to 35 kilometres (15 to 22 mi), depending on the bulb used.

In addition to the lighthouse, the site presently includes a fog signal building and an oil house. Most remnants of the former lifesaving station site have disappeared, including the original boathouse. Some of the former housing units were converted through the years into private cottages and still sit amongst the dunes nearby. Most notable amongst these are the former horse barn which is incorporated into a seasonal cottage to the north of the site, and the sizable 1920s lifesaving personnel dormitory house to the south. A newly constructed building housing a gift shop, public bathrooms and an area for display of related artifacts opened in 2014.

Fog signals have received much attention at Point Betsie. In the autumn of 1912, the fog signal building was rebuilt. The 10-inch (250 mm) locomotive whistles were replaced by 10 inch chime whistles. Meanwhile, the lamp was upgraded to an incandescent oil vapor system, with an intensity of 55,000 candlepower. In 1921, upon being connected to the electrical power grid, aa 110-volt electric bulb was installed, and the fog signal upgraded to twin Type "G" diaphones, driven by electric air compressors. The diaphone doubled the audible radius, and had the added benefit that it could be brought on line immediately, without waiting for steam engines to build pressure. The following April the fog signal's characteristic was changed to a group of two blasts every 30 seconds. Dismantled and sold as junk to the local residents in the 1970s, who hauled it away, all original fog horn apparatus has long since disappeared and is no longer on site.

The light is located on Point Betsie, Michigan, which in turn is part of a recognized terrestrial marine near shore ecosystem, dominated by a coastal dune with unique flora and fauna, including Pitcher's Thistle, Lake Huron Locust, and fascicled broomrape.

== Current status ==
The station was transferred to Benzie County under the terms of the National Historic Lighthouse Preservation Act in 2004 and, with the extensive leadership and volunteer power provided by The "Friends of Point Betsie Lighthouse" extensive restoration and renovation continues to this day. For example, the lightstation has been repainted to its original color scheme, which has not been seen since the 1940s. The site is open for tours on a seasonal basis.

Point Betsie is said to be one of America's most photographed lighthouses, and the most-visited attraction in Benzie County. Because of its picturesque form and location, it is often the subject of photographs and drawings. Even needlepoint illustrations have been rendered.

It is listed on the National Register of Historic Places, Reference #84001375.

== See also ==
- Lighthouses in the United States

== Gallery ==
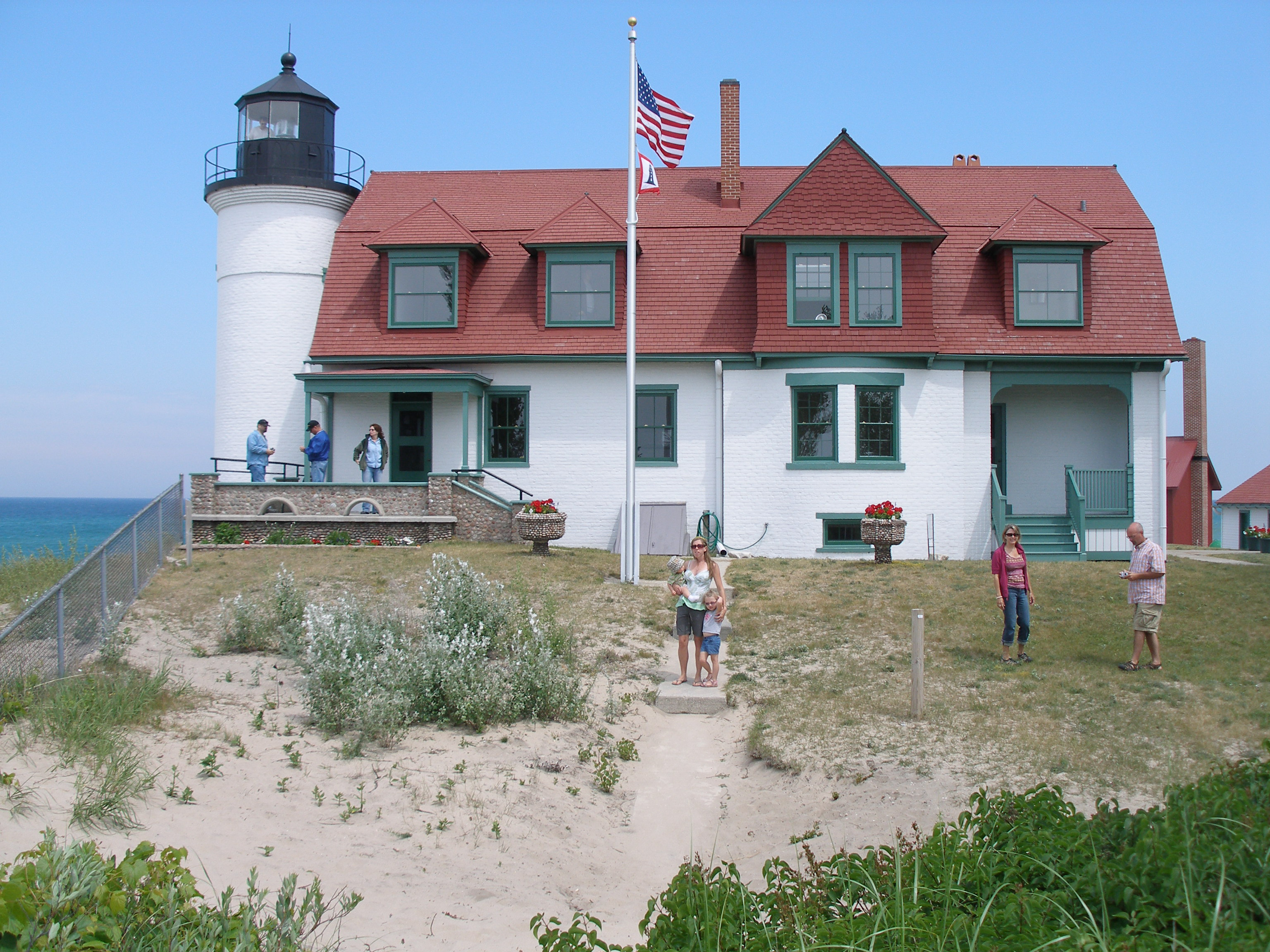
A side view of the lighthouse

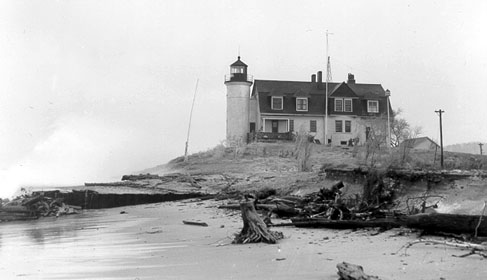
Vintage image of the station

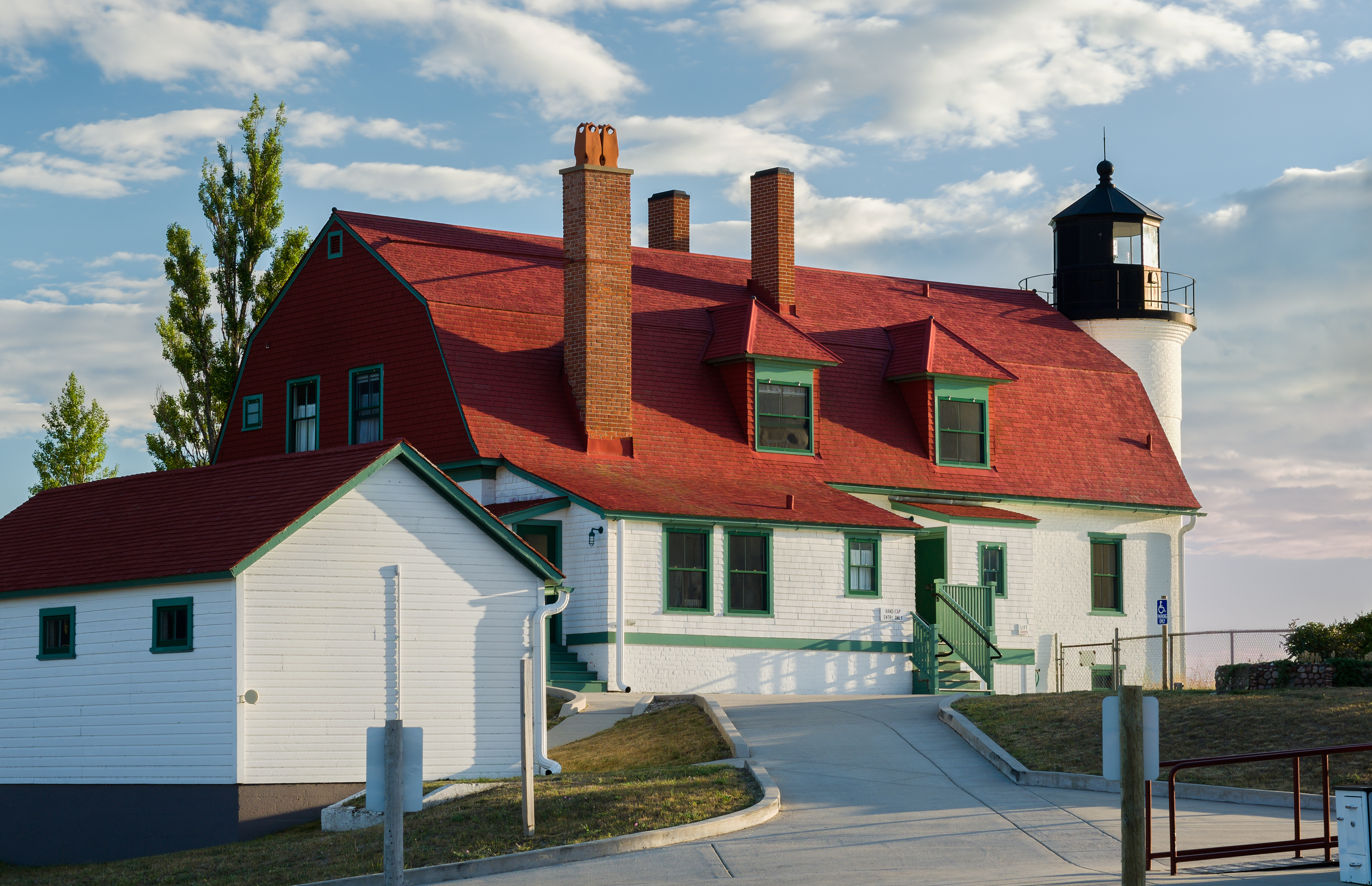
North side view of the lighthouse

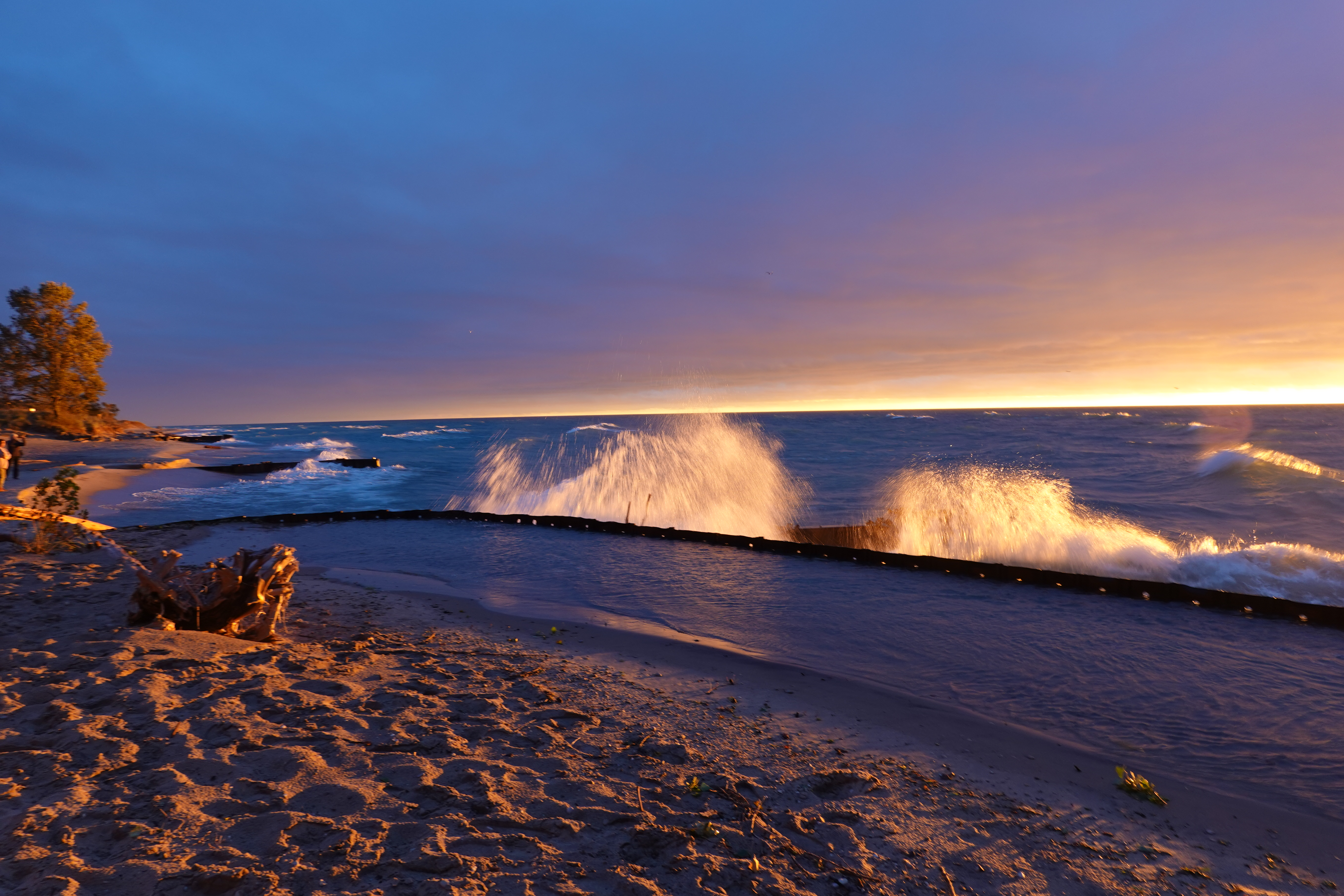
Crashing surf at sunset near the lighthouse, 23 September 2021

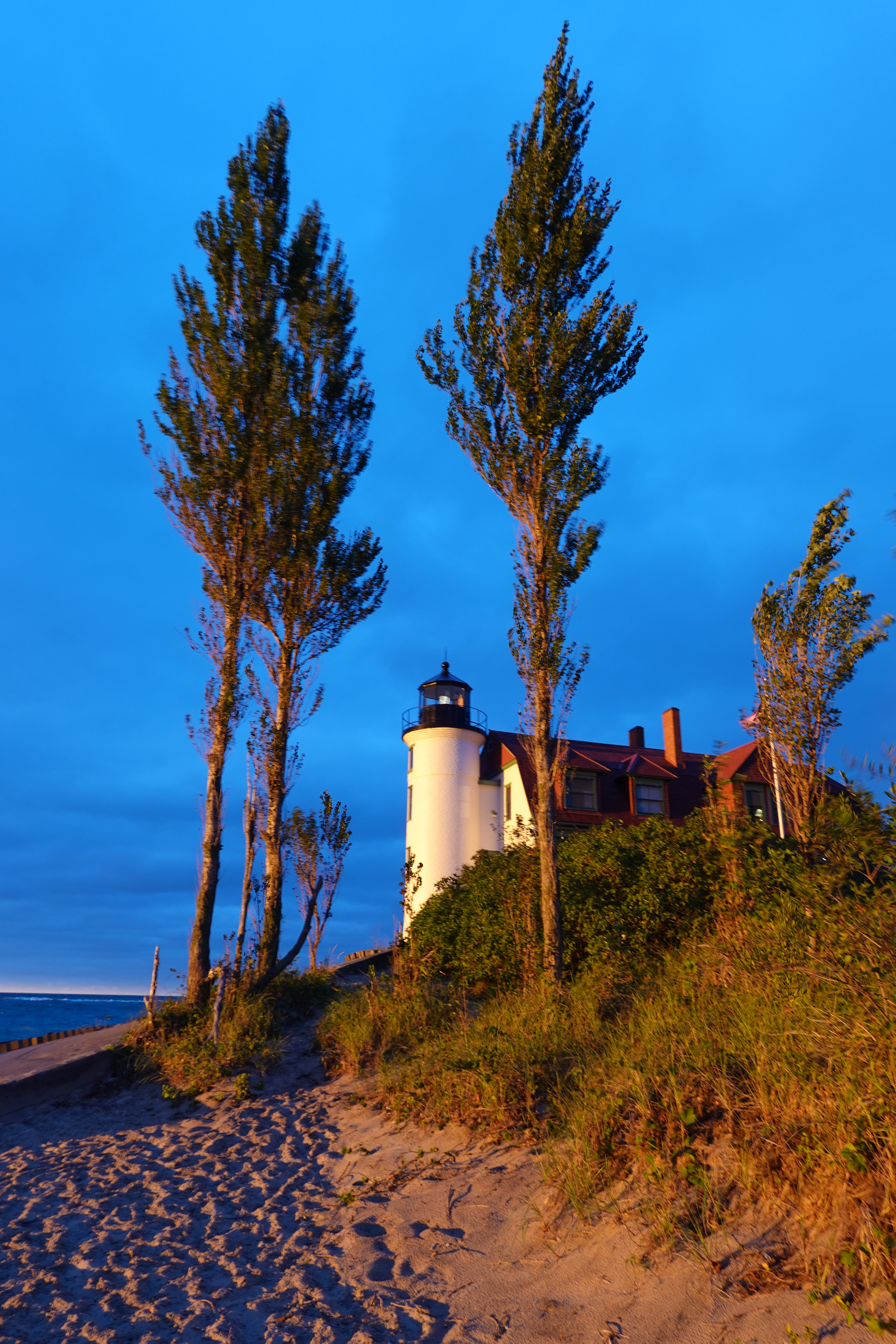
Point Betsie Lighthouse at sunset, 23 September 2021
