= March 2012 North American heat wave =

Weather event in North America

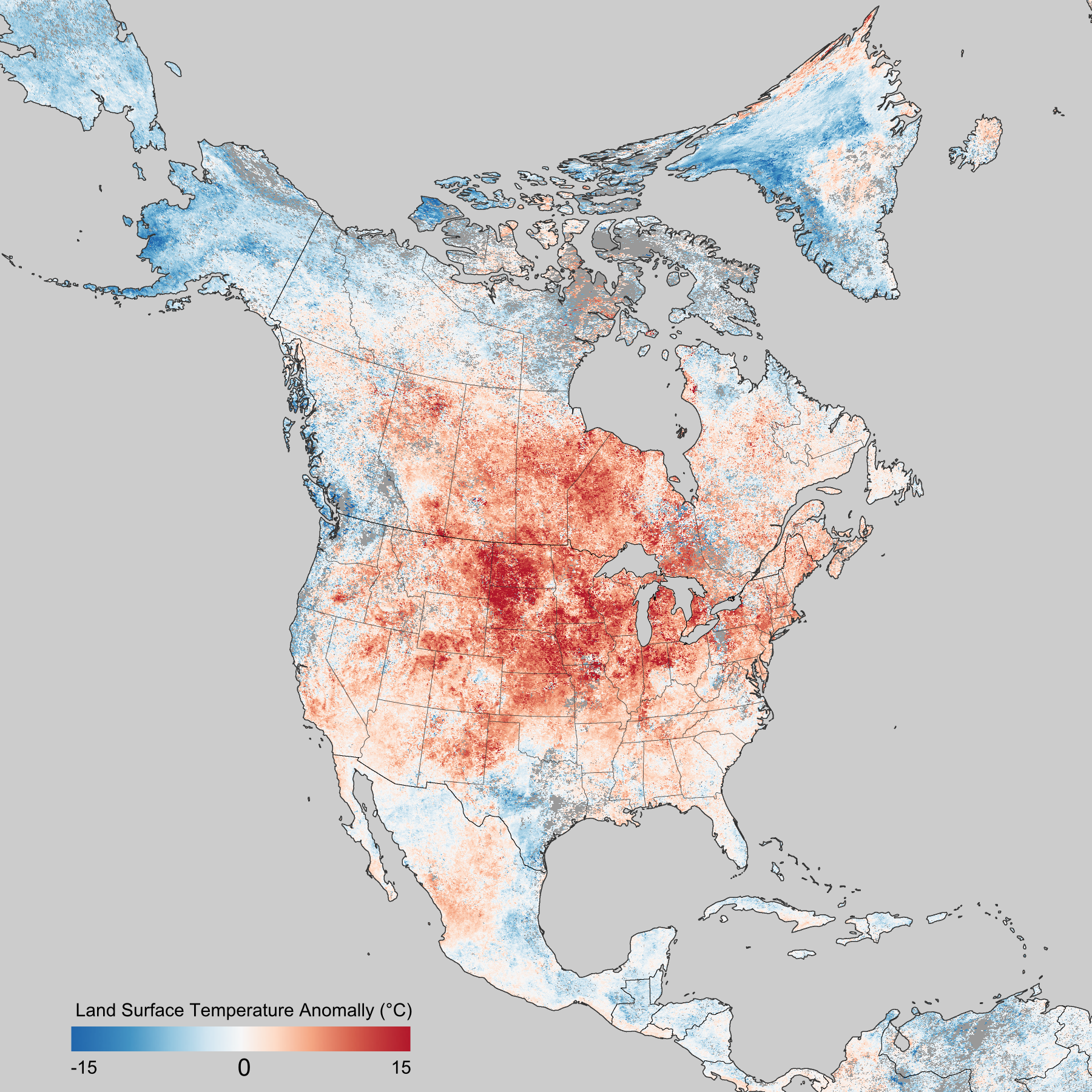
Land surface temperatures of March 8–15, 2012. Land surface temperatures are distinct from the air temperatures that meteorological stations typically measure.

In March 2012, one of the greatest heat waves was observed in many regions of North America. Very warm air pushed northward west of the Great Lakes region, and subsequently spread eastward. The intense poleward air mass movement was propelled by an unusually intense low level southerly jet that stretched from Louisiana to western Wisconsin. Once this warm surge inundated the area, a remarkably prolonged period of record setting temperatures ensued.

NOAA's National Climate Data Center reported that over 7,000 daily record high temperatures were tied or broken from 1 March through 27 March. In some places the temperature exceeded 86 °F (30 °C). For instance, in Grand Rapids, Michigan, the highest temperature recorded was 87 °F (31 °C) on March 21; in Chicago a high of 87 °F was also recorded on that same day. Records were broken in unusual ways. Chicago, for example, saw temperatures above 80 °F (27 °C) every day between March 14–18, breaking records on all five days. Chicago would go on to record eight days at or above 80 °F during the month, with many suburban areas recording an additional day in the 80s on March 19 (that day, the city only tied its record high of 78 °F (26 °C)). In context, the National Weather Service's Chicago branch noted that Chicago typically averages only one day in the 80's in April. And only once in 140 years of weather observations has April produced as many 80 °F days as this March.

Temperature records across much of southern Canada also were shattered. Some of the most impressive readings came from Nova Scotia on March 22, when the mercury climbed to 30.0 °C (86 °F) at a climate station in Lake Major, making it the highest March temperature recorded in Nova Scotia, and the third highest March temperature recorded in Canada. That same day, the temperature hit 29.2 °C (84.6 °F) at Western Head, Nova Scotia. The heat reached as far east as Cape Breton Island, with the temperature climbing to 24.0 °C (75.2 °F) at Sydney, Nova Scotia, on March 22, a place historically surrounded by ice-jammed waters, frigid winds, and snow in March. The week of March 18 also set record temperatures in Manitoba and much of Ontario as well as into the Maritime Provinces. Non-severe thunderstorms were reported on the evening hours of March 21, through to the early morning hours March 22 into northern Ontario.

In addition, NCEP/NCAR Reanalysis data show that the atmospheric pattern was so persistent that much of the Midwest and Northeast, and up into Ontario, had temperature departures over periods of several days to a week or more of magnitudes which would be unusual even for a single day. Averaged over the seven-day period from March 16 to March 22 inclusive, nearly the entire area of the Midwest and Northeast U.S. and most of Ontario and Quebec had temperatures 18 °F (10 °C) or more above the 1981-2010 average. Even more dramatically, most of Iowa and Minnesota, all of Wisconsin and Michigan, and most of southeastern Ontario had seven-day mean temperatures more than 27 °F (15 °C) above the climatological average for the same period.

An 84 °F (29 °C) high at Madison, Wisconsin in early March was 43 °F (24 °C) above average and followed an overnight low of 60 °F (16 °C), 35 °F (19 °C) above normal the daily high being more than seven standard deviations above the mean. The absolute temperature and departure statistically would be equivalent to a mid-July high at that station in excess of 125 °F (52 °C); the highest temperature recorded there was 107 °F (42 °C) at least once during the heat waves of the middle 1930s.

The warm weather was also responsible for several early-season tornado touchdowns, such as the EF3 that struck Dexter, Michigan, near Ann Arbor.

== Causes ==
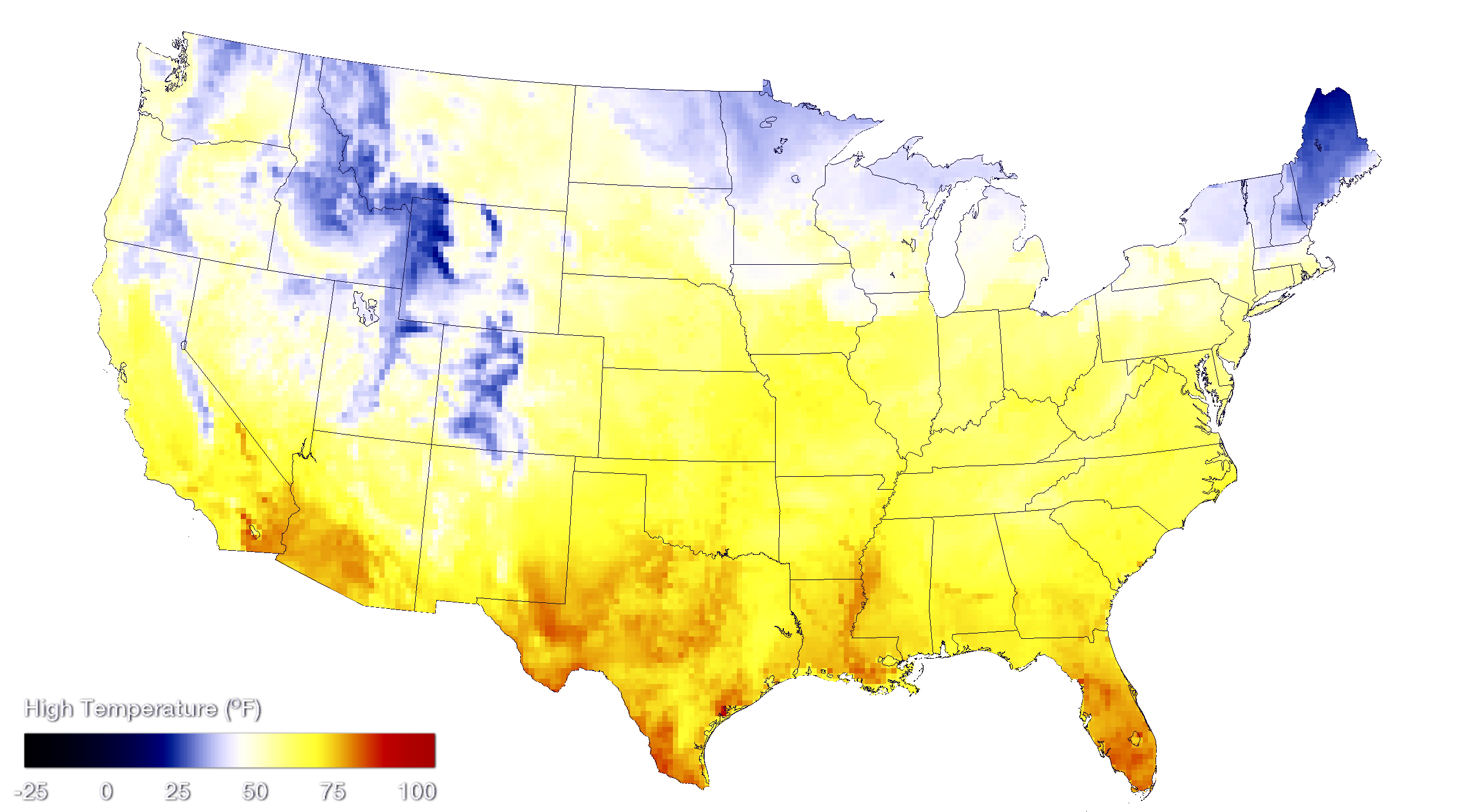
The contiguous US saw above normal temperatures in the winter of 2011-12, with numerous northern states surpassing 50°F on January 31st.

A contributing factor to the unprecedented warmth was a warmer than average winter with below-average snowfall across the CONUS, meaning less thermal energy was required to heat the atmosphere.

The primary, immediate cause of the heat wave was a buckled jet stream caused by an abnormally strong high pressure ridge atop the Eastern United States and an unusually strong and slow-moving low pressure trough across the West, which brought with it below-average temperatures and snow. The tight pressure gradient allowed for an intense southerly jet to form, which transported warm, humid air from the Gulf of Mexico northward, with the moisture having an insulating effect during the night. The ridge also deflected storm systems northward away from the Eastern U.S. and kept skies clear, allowing further daytime radiative heating to occur.

In addition, the North Atlantic oscillation was in a strongly positive phase during the heat wave, which often foreshadows above average temperatures in the Eastern U.S. The Madden-Julian oscillation also entered a phase correlated with warm temperatures in the U.S. East.

== Continued warmth ==
On June 25, Denver, Colorado, tied its all-time high with a temperature of 105 °F (41 °C). On the same day, at least two readings of 113 °F (45 °C) were recorded in Kansas. The heat was so strong that Alamosa, Colorado, broke its daily record for six consecutive days. In Galveston, Texas, the earliest 100 °F (38 °C) day ever was recorded, on June 25.

In northern Canada, Fort Good Hope, Northwest Territories had five consecutive days of 30 °C (86 °F) or higher, from June 21 to June 25, possibly the longest heat wave in Canada at that moment.

On June 26, Hill City, Kansas, was the warmest point in the United States, with the thermometer climbing to 115 °F (46 °C).

Thousands of records were being broken again on June 28. Fort Wayne, Indiana, tied its all-time record high with 106 °F (41 °C) while Indianapolis broke its monthly record, at 104 °F (40 °C). More monthly records that day included St. Louis, at 108 °F (42 °C) and Little Rock, Arkansas, at 107 °F (42 °C).

The scorching heat continued on June 29, when Washington, D.C., and Atlanta, Georgia, recorded their highest June temperatures ever, at 104 °F (40 °C). Charlotte and Raleigh, North Carolina, each tied their all-time records, at 104 °F (40 °C) and 105 °F (41 °C) respectively.

The continued heat following the lack of snow the previous winter was a contributor to the record-shattering 2012 North American drought.
