= Frankfort Light =

Lighthouse in Michigan, United States

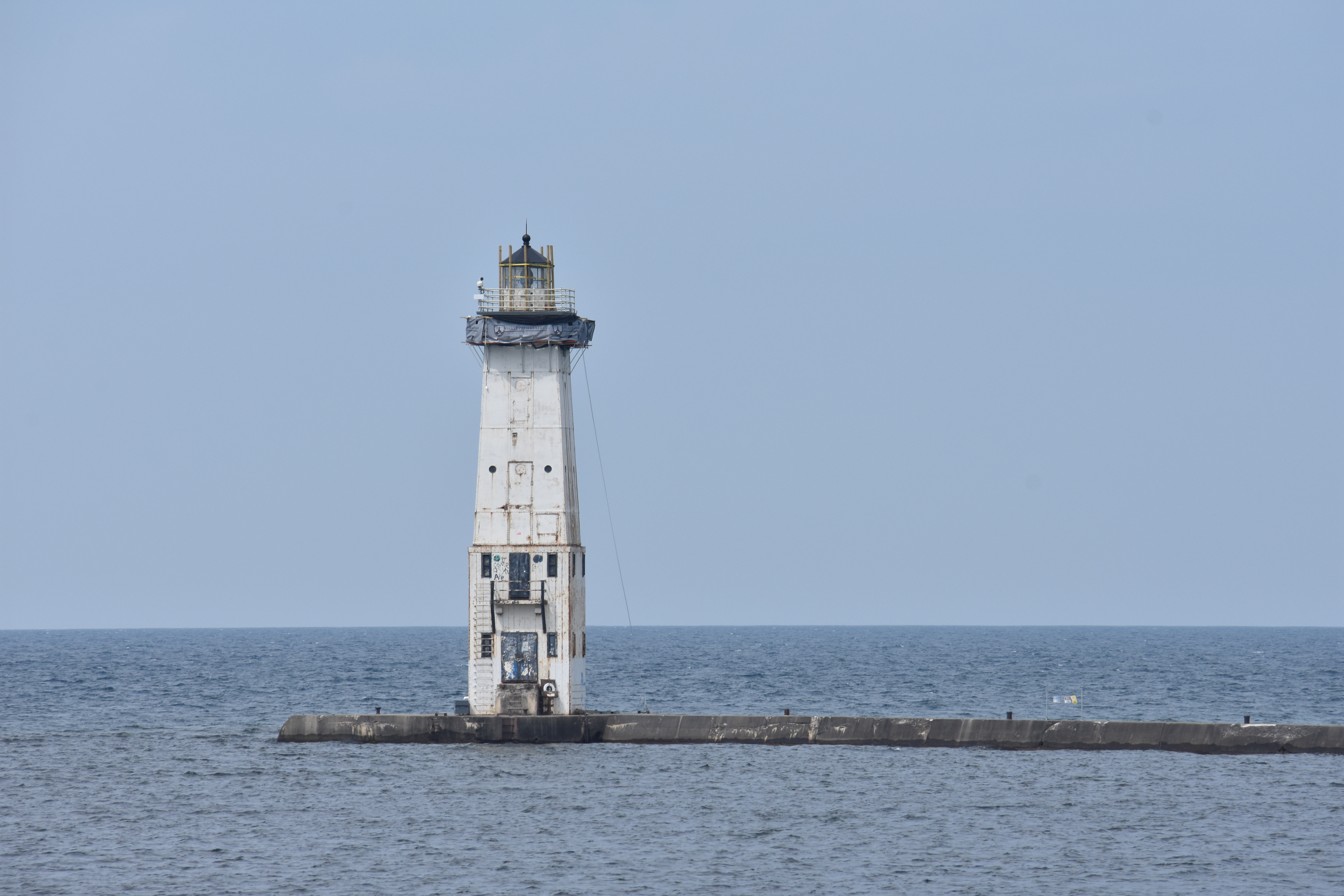
- Frankfort North Breakwater Lighthouse
- Location: Frankfort, Michigan
- Coordinates: 44.6306°N 86.2522°W

Tower
- Foundation: Two-story metal over breakwater
- Construction: Steel clad frame
- Height: 67 feet (20 m)
- Shape: Pyramidal tower
- Markings: White with Black markings, Parapet and Lantern
- Heritage: National Register of Historic Places listed place

Light
- First lit: 1873
- Focal height: 72 feet (22 m)
- Lens: 5th order Fresnel lens (original), 4th order Fresnel lens (current)
- Range: 16 nautical miles (30 km; 18 mi)
- Characteristic: F W
- Frankfort North Breakwater Light
- U.S. National Register of Historic Places
- Nearest city: Frankfort, Michigan
- Area: less than one acre
- Architect: Bureau of Lighthouses, 9th District
- MPS: Light Stations of the United States MPS
- NRHP reference No.: 05000983
- Added to NRHP: September 6, 2005

The Frankfort Light is a lighthouse located on the north breakwater in the harbor in Frankfort, Michigan. The current light was constructed in 1912 and placed on the National Register of Historic Places in 2005.

== History ==
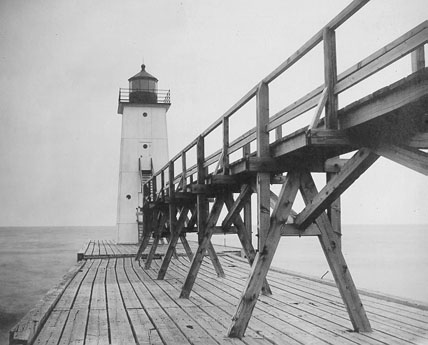
U.S. Coast Guard Archive Photo of original light

The harbor at Frankfort was first dredged in 1859. A series of improvements were begun in 1867, with piers completed in 1873. The original Frankfort North Breakwater lighthouse, an enclosed timber-framed pyramid beacon, was built in 1873 at the end of this long wooden pier with an elevated catwalk which led to the shore; the light was first lit on October 15, 1873. A fog signal was added in 1893.

In 1912, a new square steel pyramidal tower was constructed on the North Pier. The light was electrified in 1919. In the 1920s, construction began on a pair of concrete breakwaters at the harbor entrance. Construction was complete by the early 1930s. With the earlier piers now rendered obsolete, plans were made to shorten them. In 1932, the 1912 lighthouse was removed from the north pier and relocated at the head of the north breakwater. The original pyramid style lighthouse was increased in size by placing it on top of a new two-story addition.

In 2010, the US Coast Guard excessed the lighthouse, and in 2011 ownership was transferred to the city of Frankfort.

== Description ==
The current breakwater light in Frankfort is located at the head of the north breakwater. It is a square steel pyramidal tower; the original 1912 lighthouse stands 44 feet (13 m) tall. The light is placed atop a 25-foot (7.6 m) tall square steel base. The cast iron lantern room, surrounded by a gallery, originally contained a fifth order Fresnel lens that was upgraded to a fourth order Fresnel lens. Other structures associated with the light include a radio beacon and a United States Coast Guard station.
