= Frankfort, Michigan =

- City
- City of Frankfort
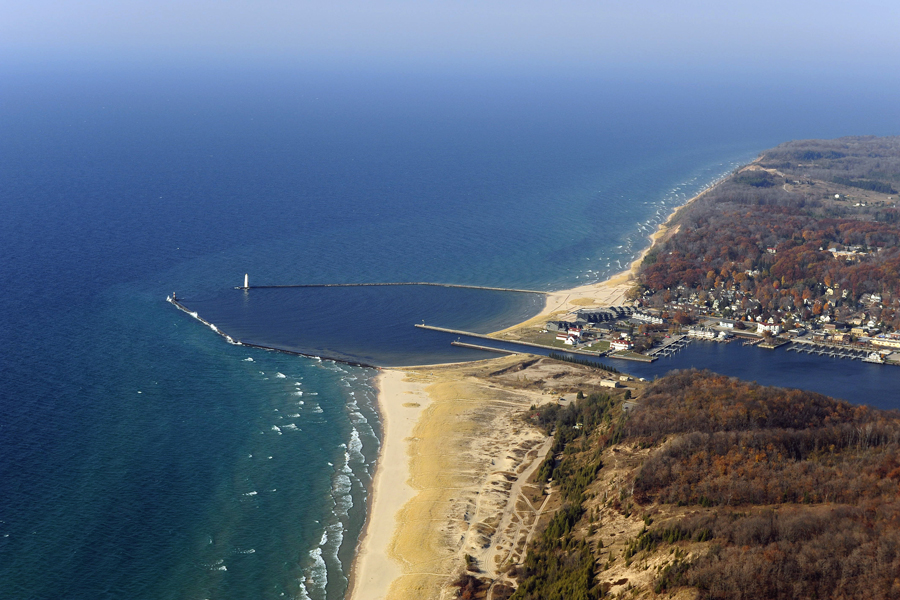
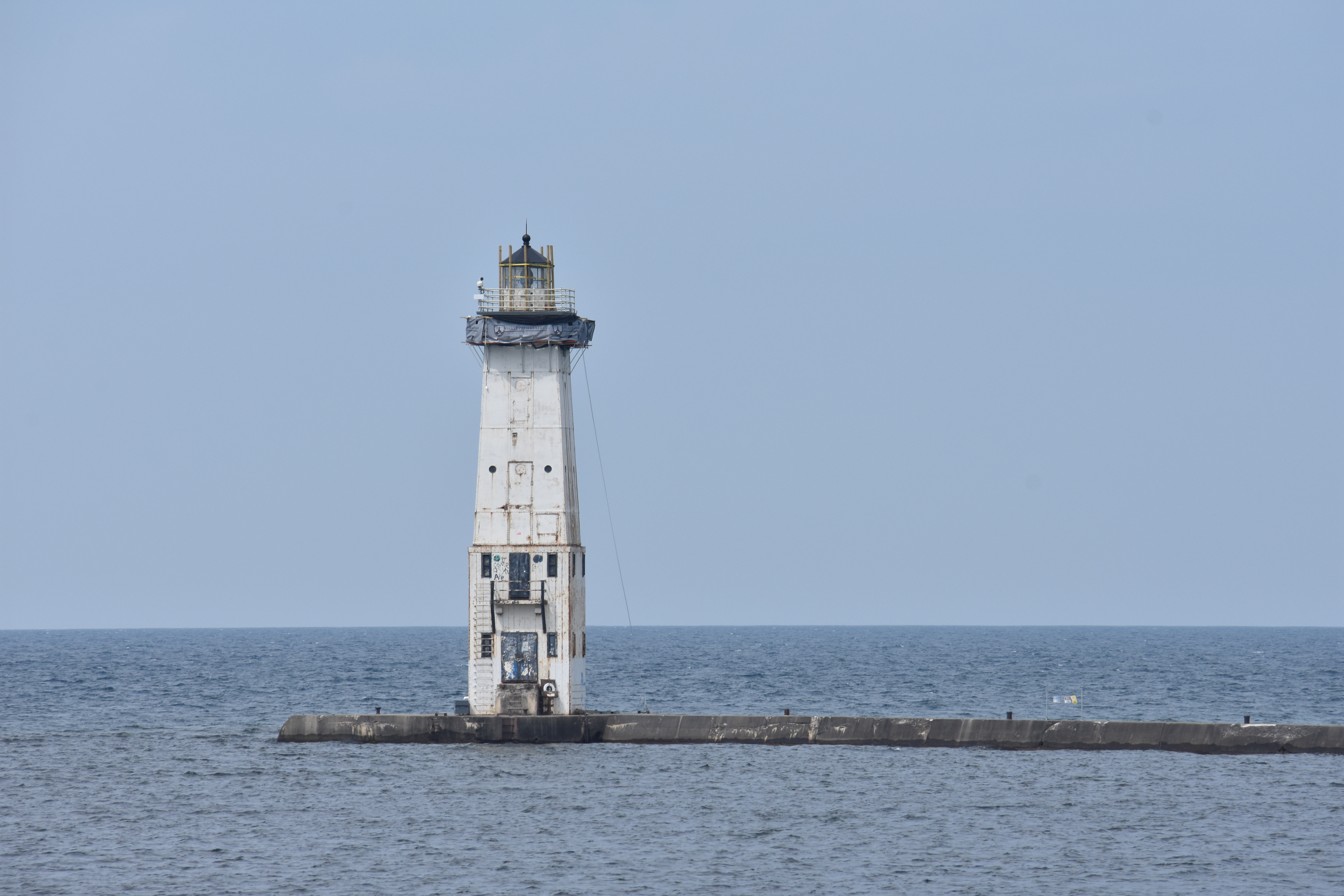
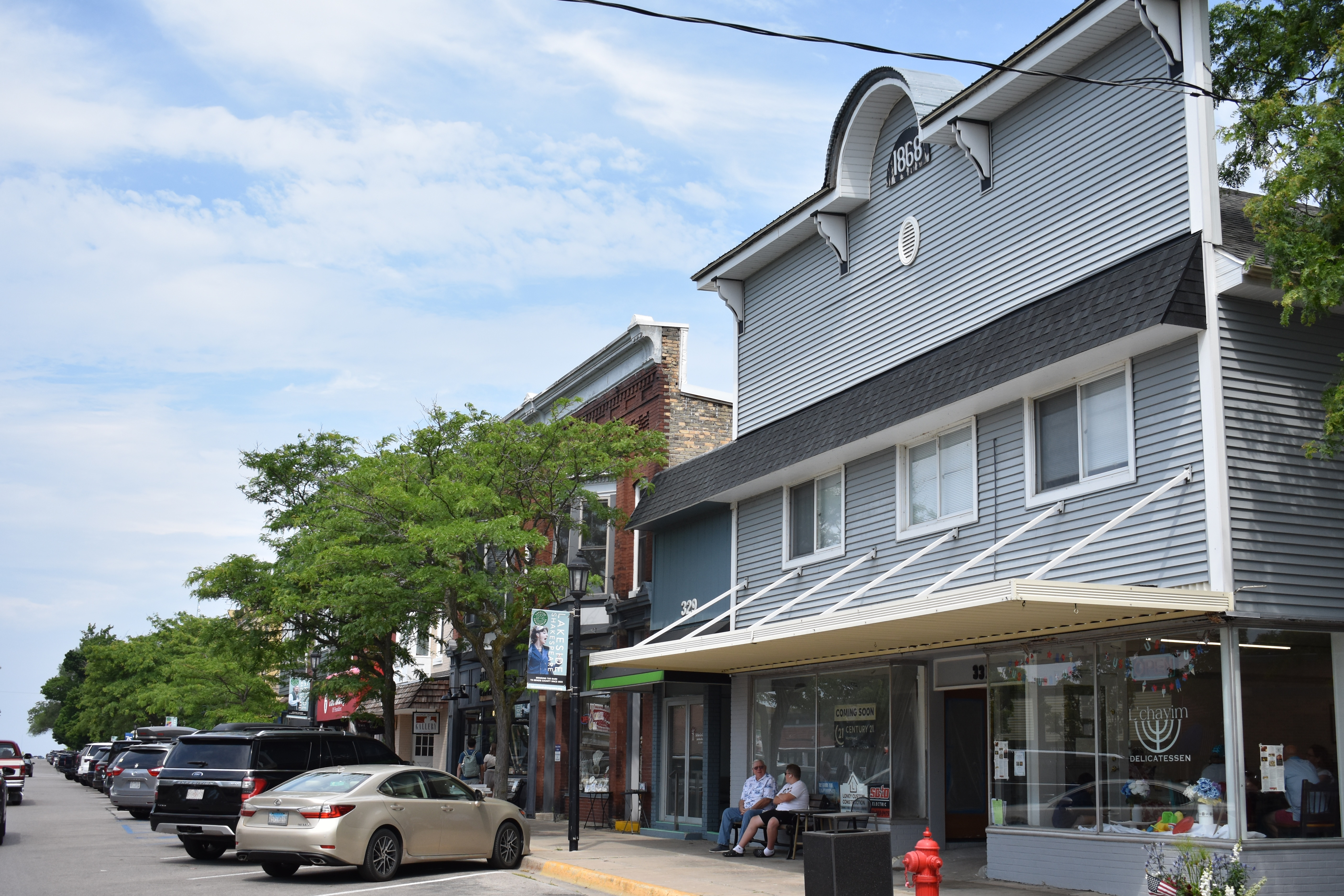
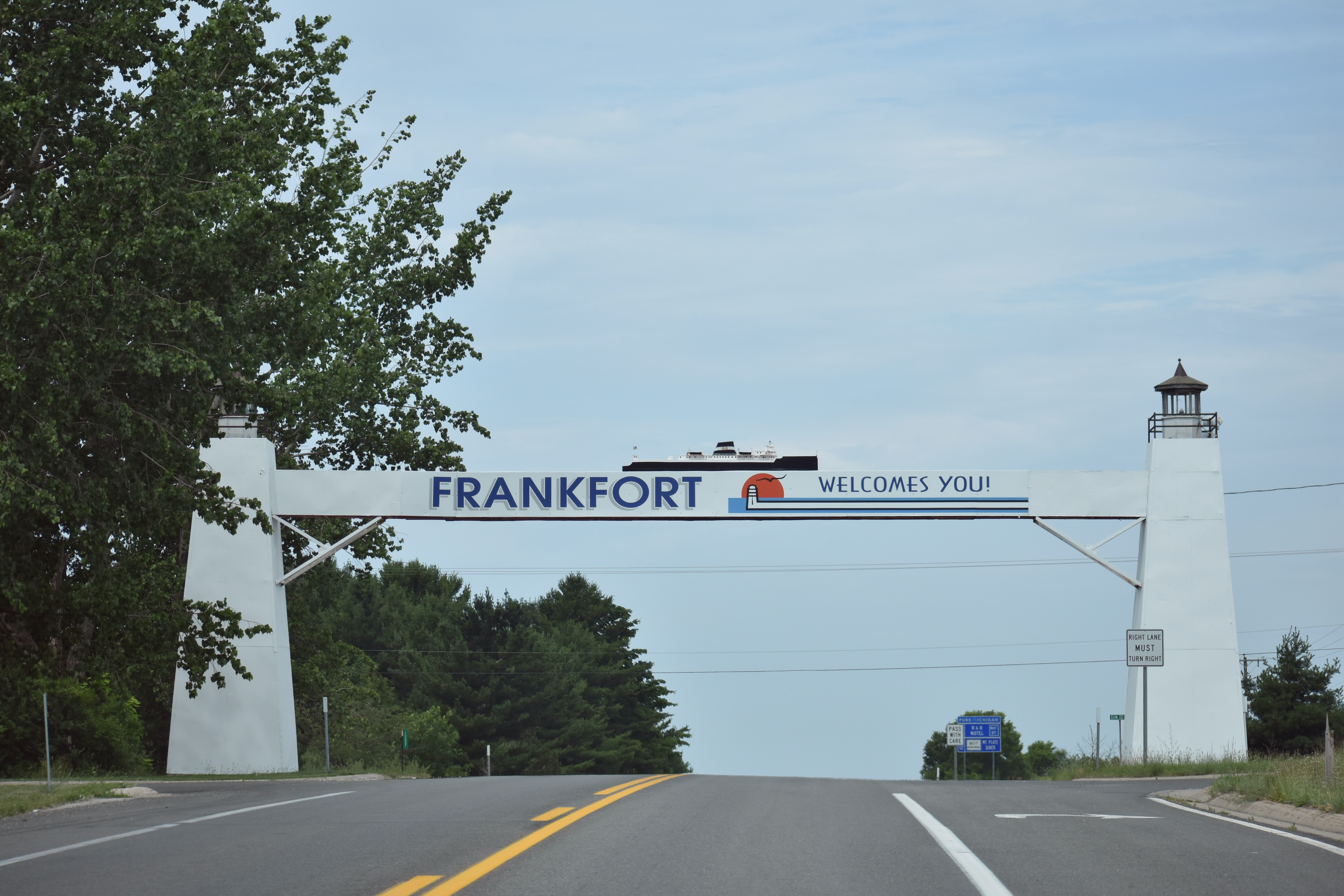
- Aerial view of Frankfort Harbor Frankfort Light Downtown Frankfort Frankfort Car Ferry Welcome Sign

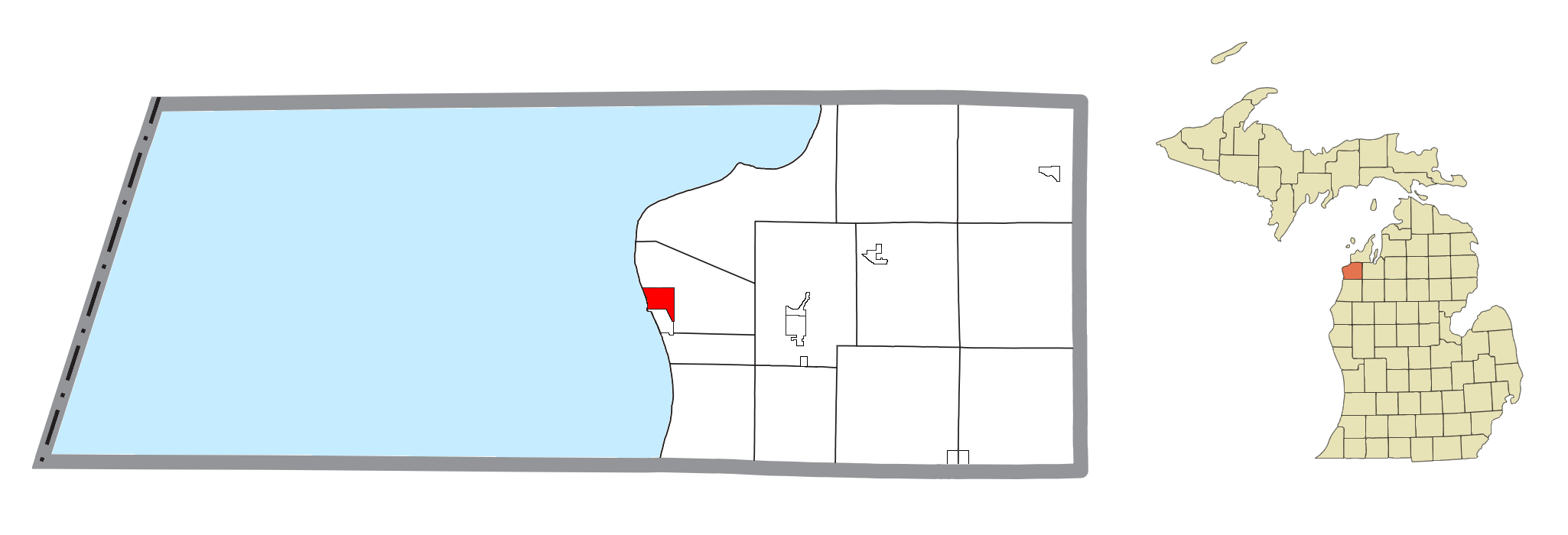
- Location within Benzie County

- Location within the state of Michigan
- Coordinates: 44°38′01″N 86°14′04″W
- Country: United States
- State: Michigan
- County: Benzie
- Established: 1850
- Incorporated: 1885 (village); 1935 (city)

Government
  - Mayor: Liz Dobrzynski

Area
  - Total: 1.59 sq mi (4.11 km^{2})
  - Land: 1.39 sq mi (3.60 km^{2})
  - Water: 0.20 sq mi (0.51 km^{2})
- Elevation: 633 ft (193 m)

Population (2020)
  - Total: 1,252
  - Density: 900.5/sq mi (347.67/km^{2})
- Time zone: UTC-5 (EST)
  - Summer (DST): UTC-4 (EDT)
- ZIP code(s): 49635
- Area code: 231
- FIPS code: 26-30260
- GNIS feature ID: 0626407
- Website: Official website

Frankfort is a city in the U.S. state of Michigan. Located within Benzie County, the city sits upon the shore of Lake Michigan at the mouth of the Betsie River. The city had a population of 1,252 at the 2020 census.

== History ==
Father Jacques Marquette, one of the first Jesuit missionaries to the Great Lakes Indians, may have died and been buried in Frankfort in May 1675. Very limited and inexact records make the death site a matter of considerable debate among historians. Frankfort is one of two locations attributed as the death site by the natives since the earliest settlers arrived in northern Michigan and one of at least two sites claimed by historians. In any case within two years the remains were taken to the church at St. Ignace and given a traditional Indian burial.

The land which was to become the City of Frankfort was recognized at an early date for its economic and commercial potential because it was nearly all purchased by the contractors who surveyed the land for the United States—the Risdon family. The first known settler in Frankfort was Joseph Oliver who purchased the 14 acres (57,000 m^{2}) between Lake Aux Becs Scies and Lake Michigan in 1852 and built a small cabin. Oliver was a woodsman who lived off the land: fishing, hunting, trapping and cutting timber. In 1855 a schooner owned by George W. Tifft of Cleveland was caught in a gale on Lake Michigan and driven before the wind. Imagine the surprise of Captain Snow when he found a previously little-known river outlet and harbor which provided a safe refuge. Thus, Aux Becs Scies Lake was discovered by an outside investor, George W. Tifft, who purchased most of the land around and adjoining the lake (more than a thousand acres (4 km^{2}) all together). In 1859 a company from Detroit owned by Ransom Gardiner, George S. Frost, and others purchased the Tifft lands and commenced development of Frankfort within the year. In September, Louis A. Doby moved to the area as agent of the developers with John H. Adams to oversee the work. They sent along a sawmill and A.S. Dow to manage that phase of the development. Descendants of the Dow family—founders of the Dow Chemical Company—are unaware of any relationship to A.S. Dow. Doby held a contract to dredge a new channel so the harbor would be available for navigation by all types of craft. He also constructed a building for the firm which served as a hotel and store. The first lot in the development near the west end of Forest Avenue was sold to William H. Cogshall. He built a large home for his family, but his dwelling also served the fledgling community as a hotel and for religious and political meetings. The second lot, also at the west end of Forest Avenue, was purchased by Dr. Alonzo J. Slyfield, who served for 22 years as keeper of the Point Betsie Light House. Although the development had a promising start there was relatively little activity during the Civil War years. Virtually all of this early development took place in the area of First, Second, Third, Fourth, and Main Streets and Forest Avenue.

By 1867 the United States government recognized the importance of Aux Becs Scies harbor and commenced improvements. Doby's work from 1859 had completely disappeared and a channel was dredged at the south end of the strip of land dividing the two lakes. Shortly an enthusiastic newspaperman reported four to ten vessel arrivals a day and new settlers in droves. Stores were built and a large hotel, the Delbridge House, opened for business. A post office had been established in 1860 with Cogshall as postmaster but was eventually closed for want of business. This was reopened in 1867 with N.W. Nelson postmaster. Among the other early settlers were Jacob and Charles Voorhies, J.B. Delbridge, Dr. T. Harvey, and J.B. Collins who opened his drug store in 1869.

Although the harbor was opened in 1867, work on it continued for several years. By 1870 the channel was 200 feet (61 m) wide and had a south pier of 600 feet (180 m) while the north one measured 550 feet (170 m). A depth of about nine feet was maintained which allowed most of the vessels on the Great Lakes to enter the harbor. In 1873, the United States Lighthouse Service established the first pier head light to mark the entrance. In 1887 a United States Life Saving Station was established on the south side of the harbor. In 1934, as the United States Coast Guard, this station was moved to large new quarters on the Frankfort side of the channel. The original piers had been extended until they reached a length of 2,000 feet (610 m) in 1912. Between 1929 and 1932 the breakwaters were built to protect the harbor and the old piers were reduced in length.

The Pratt hotel postcard c. 1909

When Crystal Lake Township was organized in 1859, it included all of the present Benzie County. The first township meeting was held in the spring of 1860 at Frankfort in Doby's (the development company) store. The Benzie County government was organized by Public Act 385 of 1869 and local citizens set off in search of a county seat and a courthouse. After two elections, Frankfort was chosen and the Supervisors met in the community for the first time in April 1870. Although the first session was held in the Saterlee Hotel later sessions were held in a two-story commercial building on the corner of Second and Main Streets. However, in 1872 new elections were held and citizens of the county decided to move the county seat into the countryside east of Benzonia. Frankfort contested the move and managed to retain the seat of government, at least in name, until 1876. Following another election in 1894, the county seat returned to the community and a large school building was converted to a courthouse. Although the matter was frequently debated the county seat remained in Frankfort until 1908 when citizens voted to move it to an abandoned church in the Village of Honor.

In October 1873, the citizens of Frankfort unanimously petitioned the circuit court to become a village under a new act of the State Legislature. The petition was granted but the effort failed when the State Act was declared unconstitutional. In 1885 the citizens petitioned the State Legislature in the normal fashion and the incorporated village of Frankfort was established by Local Act No. 352 of 1885 on April 1 and by Local Act No. 352 of 1885 on May 14. (Legal boundaries of Frankfort are: Government Lots 2, 3, and 4 of Section 21; the Southeast Quarter of the Northeast Quarter of Section 21; the South Half of the North Half of Section 22; Government Lots 1, 2, 3, and 4 of Section 27; and the Northwest Fractional Quarter of Section 28 of Township No. 26 North of Range No. 16 West.)

Frankfort has enjoyed a steady growth over the years and by the 1930s had reached a population whereby they could become a city. Accordingly, voters of the village elected to become a city of the fifth class on March 11, 1935, with 229 votes in favor and 127 against. There was no change in the boundaries of the original village.

== Geography ==
- According to the United States Census Bureau, the city has a total area of 1.59 square miles (4.12 km^{2}), of which 1.39 square miles (3.60 km^{2}) is land and 0.20 square miles (0.52 km^{2}) is water.
- Frankfort bills itself as the gateway to the Sleeping Bear Dunes National Lakeshore.
- Frankfort is considered to be part of Northern Michigan.
- The Point Betsie Light is in the area and has been in operation for 150 years. It is locally operated and maintained, and is undergoing a complete renovation.
- The town is close to the Interlochen State Park, which is one of two remaining stands of virgin Eastern White Pine in the Lower Peninsula.

=== Climate ===
The Köppen Climate Classification subtype for this climate is "Dfb" (Warm Summer Continental Climate).

Climate data for Frankfort 2 NE, Michigan (948 feet) 1991–2020 normals, extremes 1898–present
Month	Jan	Feb	Mar	Apr	May	Jun	Jul	Aug	Sep	Oct	Nov	Dec	Year
Record high °F (°C)	56 (13)	63 (17)	79 (26)	86 (30)	90 (32)	95 (35)	99 (37)	95 (35)	92 (33)	84 (29)	79 (26)	62 (17)	99 (37)
Mean daily maximum °F (°C)	28.6 (−1.9)	30.6 (−0.8)	39.5 (4.2)	51.8 (11.0)	63.9 (17.7)	73.4 (23.0)	77.4 (25.2)	76.1 (24.5)	69.0 (20.6)	56.2 (13.4)	43.9 (6.6)	33.6 (0.9)	53.7 (12.1)
Daily mean °F (°C)	23.6 (−4.7)	24.8 (−4.0)	32.5 (0.3)	43.2 (6.2)	54.4 (12.4)	64.0 (17.8)	68.9 (20.5)	68.3 (20.2)	61.4 (16.3)	49.6 (9.8)	38.4 (3.6)	28.9 (−1.7)	46.5 (8.1)
Mean daily minimum °F (°C)	18.5 (−7.5)	19.1 (−7.2)	25.4 (−3.7)	34.6 (1.4)	44.9 (7.2)	54.6 (12.6)	60.4 (15.8)	60.5 (15.8)	53.9 (12.2)	42.9 (6.1)	32.9 (0.5)	24.1 (−4.4)	39.3 (4.1)
Record low °F (°C)	−20 (−29)	−32 (−36)	−15 (−26)	−1 (−18)	19 (−7)	29 (−2)	33 (1)	31 (−1)	26 (−3)	18 (−8)	−8 (−22)	−4 (−20)	−32 (−36)
Average precipitation inches (mm)	2.19 (56)	1.72 (44)	1.98 (50)	3.06 (78)	3.08 (78)	3.17 (81)	3.04 (77)	3.18 (81)	3.75 (95)	3.99 (101)	2.94 (75)	2.23 (57)	34.34 (872)
Average snowfall inches (cm)	27.2 (69)	19.4 (49)	12.8 (33)	3.3 (8.4)	0.1 (0.25)	0.0 (0.0)	0.0 (0.0)	0.0 (0.0)	0.0 (0.0)	0.3 (0.76)	6.4 (16)	23.5 (60)	93.0 (236)
Average precipitation days (≥ 0.01 in)	15.2	11.2	9.3	10.1	10.7	9.2	9.2	8.6	10.6	13.0	12.4	13.2	132.7
Average snowy days (≥ 0.1 in)	14.2	10.4	6.2	1.9	0.1	0.0	0.0	0.0	0.0	0.2	4.3	11.4	48.7
Source: NOAA

== Demographics ==
Historical population
Census	Pop.	Note	%±
1880	782		—
1890	1,175		50.3%
1900	1,465		24.7%
1910	1,555		6.1%
1920	1,244		−20.0%
1930	1,468		18.0%
1940	1,642		11.9%
1950	1,605		−2.3%
1960	1,690		5.3%
1970	1,660		−1.8%
1980	1,603		−3.4%
1990	1,546		−3.6%
2000	1,513		−2.1%
2010	1,286		−15.0%
2020	1,252		−2.6%
U.S. Decennial Census

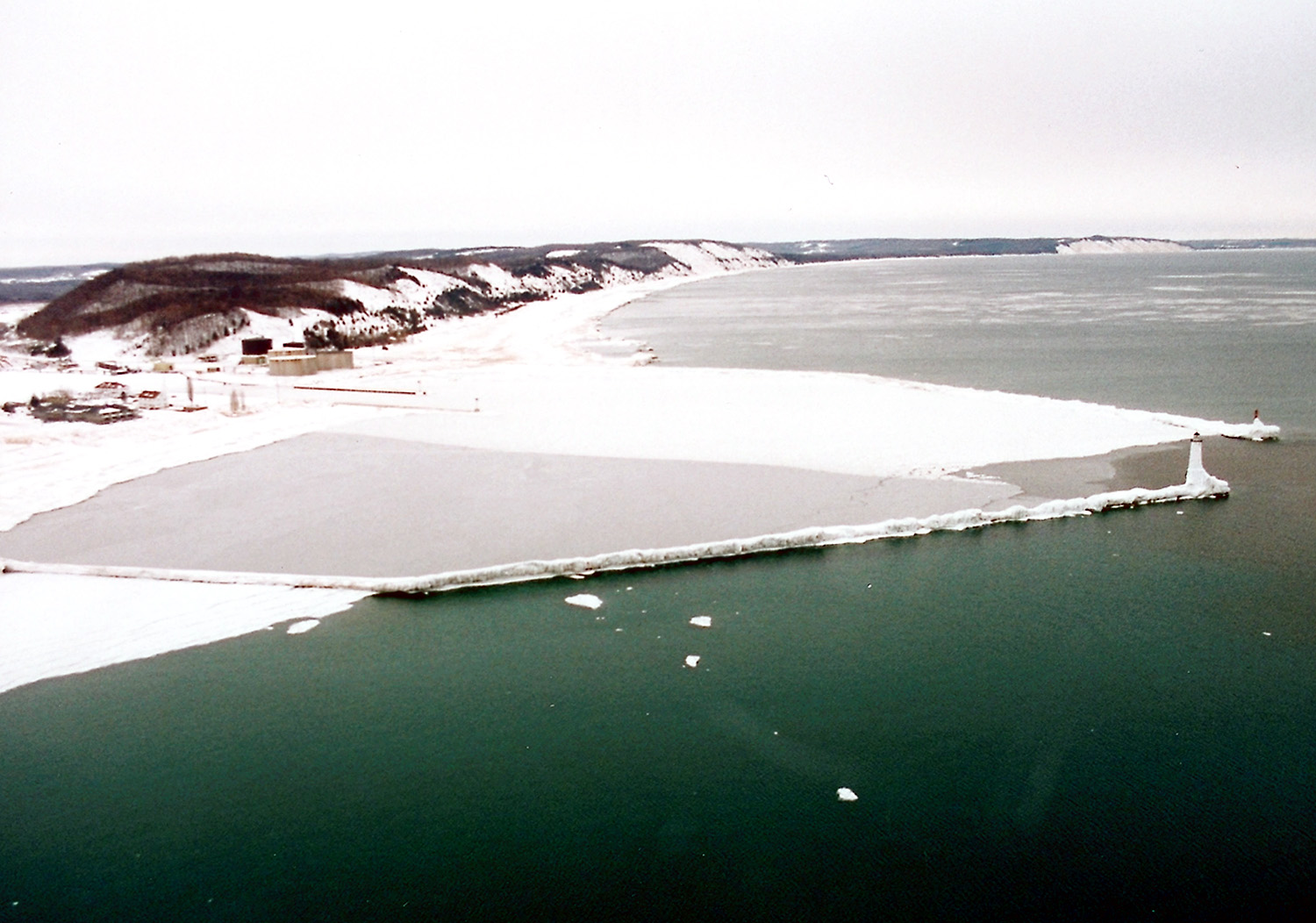
The harbor entrance to Frankfort was completely frozen over in February 1994.

=== 2010 census ===
As of the census of 2010, there were 1,286 people, 601 households, and 328 families residing in the city. The population density was 925.2 inhabitants per square mile (357.2/km^{2}). There were 942 housing units at an average density of 677.7 per square mile (261.7/km^{2}). The racial makeup of the city was 94.3% White, 1.1% African American, 2.0% Native American, 1.1% Asian, 0.2% from other races, and 1.2% from two or more races. Hispanic or Latino people of any race were 2.0% of the population.

There were 601 households, of which 18.0% had children under the age of 18 living with them, 41.8% were married couples living together, 10.0% had a female householder with no husband present, 2.8% had a male householder with no wife present, and 45.4% were non-families. 41.3% of all households were made up of individuals, and 23.3% had someone living alone who was 65 years of age or older. The average household size was 1.98 and the average family size was 2.63.

The median age in the city was 54.6 years. 15.4% of residents were under the age of 18; 5.2% were between the ages of 18 and 24; 16.7% were from 25 to 44; 26.6% were from 45 to 64; and 36.1% were 65 years of age or older. The gender makeup of the city was 44.8% male and 55.2% female.

=== 2000 census ===
As of the census of 2000, there were 1,513 people, 665 households, and 395 families residing in the city. The population density was 1,084.4 inhabitants per square mile (418.7/km^{2}). There were 873 housing units at an average density of 625.7 per square mile (241.6/km^{2}). The racial makeup of the city was 95.84% White, 0.33% African American, 2.31% Native American, 0.26% Asian, 0.13% from other races, and 1.12% from two or more races. Hispanic or Latino people of any race were 1.78% of the population.

There were 665 households, out of which 20.9% had children under the age of 18 living with them, 46.9% were married couples living together, 9.6% had a female householder with no husband present, and 40.6% were non-families. 36.1% of all households were made up of individuals, and 21.4% had someone living alone who was 65 years of age or older. The average household size was 2.11 and the average family size was 2.71.

In the city, the population was spread out, with 17.9% under the age of 18, 6.3% from 18 to 24, 20.8% from 25 to 44, 23.7% from 45 to 64, and 31.2% who were 65 years of age or older. The median age was 49 years. For every 100 females, there were 78.2 males. For every 100 females age 18 and over, there were 76.2 males.

The median income for a household in the city was $33,821, and the median income for a family was $43,375. Males had a median income of $29,205 versus $21,389 for females. The per capita income for the city was $20,132. About 6.6% of families and 10.2% of the population were below the poverty line, including 13.6% of those under age 18 and 9.1% of those age 65 or over.

== Economy ==
The area is a tourism hotspot, providing a wide variety of recreational opportunities on and off the water. Local activities, attractions, and its location near rivers, lakes, and Lake Michigan, plus forests, make it a four-season destination. This claim is proudly advertised on the arch above the town's entrance. It is highly recommended by a report in The New York Times as a starting point for bicycling, whether for a day trip or longer. Shopping and antiquing in the historic downtown are a significant portion of the economic base. Frankfort is close to the Interlochen Center for the Arts and Crystal Mountain (Michigan).

== Infrastructure ==
- M-22 / LMCT runs primarily north–south through Frankfort, paralleling the shore of Lake Michigan throughout its length.
- M-115 begins just east of Frankfort, and continues east to Beulah, Copemish, Mesick, Cadillac, and Clare. The highway can be used to access US Highway 31.

== See also ==
- National Landmark of Soaring
