= Benzie County Central Schools =

Public school district in Benzie and Manistee Counties in the U.S. State of Michigan

Address
- 9300 Homestead Rd. Benzonia, Benzie County, Michigan, 48831; United States
- Coordinates: 44°37′07″N 85°03′13″W

District information
- Grades: Pre-Kindergarten-12
- Superintendent: Amiee Erfourth
- Schools: 6
- Budget: $41,477,000 2022-2023 expenditures
- NCES District ID: 2604950

Students and staff
- Students: 1,140 (2024-2025)
- Teachers: 69.63 (on an FTE basis) (2024-2025)
- Staff: 150.48 FTE (2024-2025)
- Student–teacher ratio: 16.37 (2024-2025)

Other information
- Website: benzieschools.net

Benzie County Central Schools, also known as Benzie Central Schools, is a public school district in Northern Michigan.

== Geographic Area ==
In Benzie County, it serves Benzonia, Beulah, Honor, Lake Ann, Thompsonville, the townships of Benzonia, Colfax, Homestead, Inland, Joyfield, Weldon, and parts of the townships of Almira, Blaine, Gilmore, Lake, and Platte. In Grand Traverse County, it serves parts of Grant. In Manistee County, it serves Copemish and parts of the townships of Cleon, Marilla, Pleasanton, and Springdale. In Wexford County, it serves part of Wexford Township.

== History ==
In the fall of 1962, the school systems of Benzonia–Beulah, Honor, and Copemish were consolidated into the current school district. Classes were held in the old Benzonia High School until 1964, the year that the current junior-senior high school building in Benzonia Township was opened. Benzie Central High School was dedicated on November 8, 1964.

Prior to consolidation, Benzonia and Copemish both had high schools. Benzie high school was built in 1894, and its 1940 gymnasium addition remains at 7040 Severance Street.

== Schools ==
Schools in Benzie Central Schools district
School	Address	Notes
Benzie Central High School	9300 Homestead Rd., Benzonia	Grades 9-12
Benzie Central Middle School	9300 Homestead Rd, Benzonia	Grades 6-8
Betsie Valley Elementary	17936 Cadillac Hwy., Thompsonville	Grades PreK-5
Homestead Hills Elementary	849 Husky Trail, Benzonia	Grades PreK-5
Lake Ann Elementary	19375 Bronson Lake Rd, Interlochen	Grades PreK-5
Benzie Academy	9222 Homestead Road, Benzonia	Alternative school/online school for grades 7-12

=== Former elementary schools ===
- Crystal Lake Elementary School (closed 2023, replaced by Homestead Hills Elementary School)
- Platte River Elementary School (closed 2018; served Honor)
