= Cherry Bowl Drive-In Theatre & Diner =

Cherry Bowl Drive-In Theatre
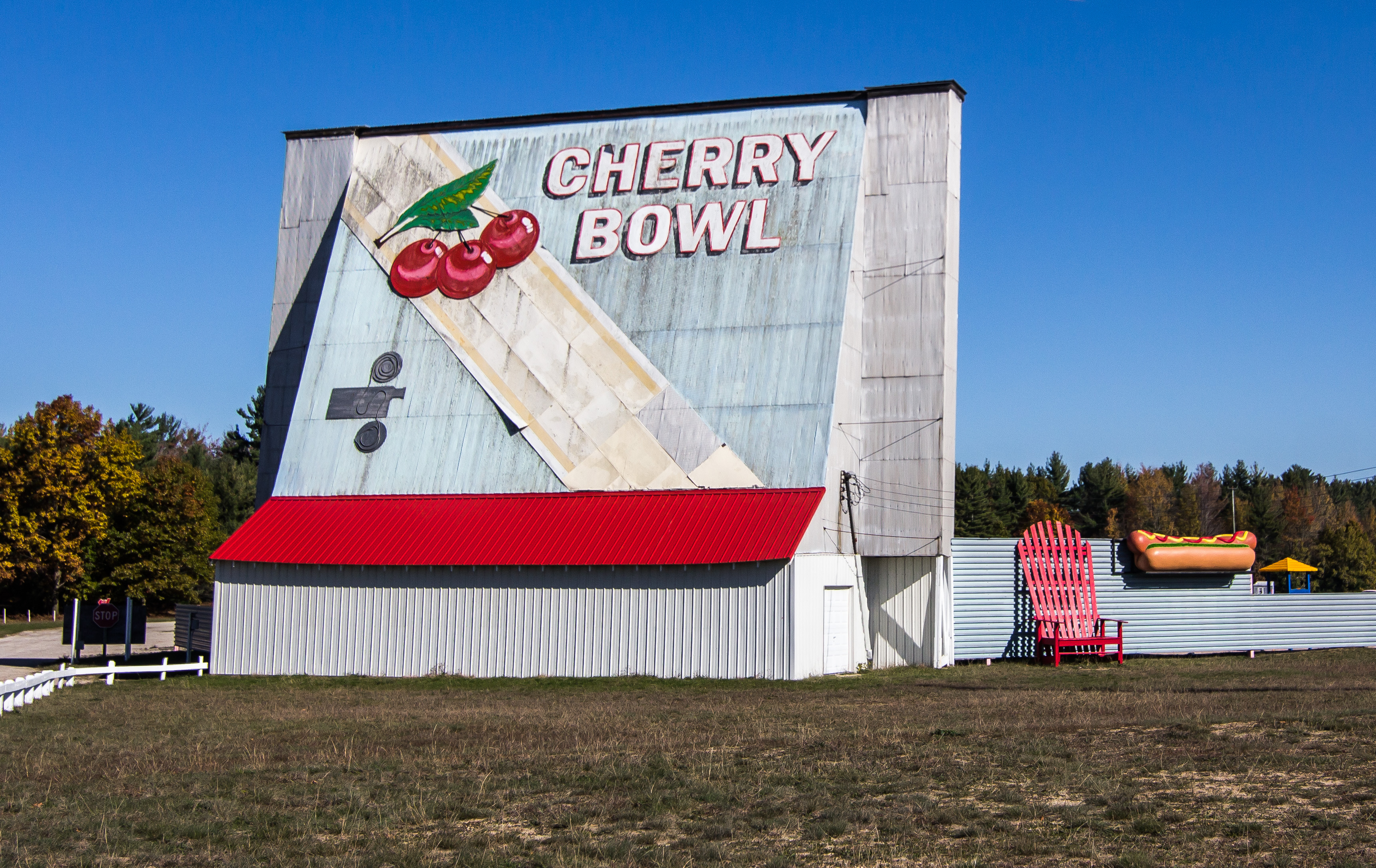
- Cherry Bowl Theatre, October 2018

- Location within Michigan
- 44.6678°N 86.0432°W
- Location: 9812 Honor Hwy, Honor, Michigan

History
- Built: 1953

Site notes
- Website: http://cherrybowldrivein.com

The Cherry Bowl Drive-In Theatre & Diner is a historic drive-in theater with a concession stand in Honor, Michigan, on US Highway 31 (US 31). It opened on July 4, 1953, and was one of eight remaining drive-in theaters in Michigan in 2024. It has a snack bar, children's play areas, putt-putt golf, beach volleyball, and a rest area for dogs. The Cherry Bowl is the only remaining drive-in theater in Northern Michigan. The Cherry Bowl's sound system uses the original vacuum tube motiograph amplifiers powering speakers at speaker posts. An FM radio option is also offered. The drive-in theatre is open in the summertime. The Cherry Bowl has converted to digital HD projection.

Then-governor Jennifer Granholm told the Detroit Free Press in 2009 that residents "haven't lived in Michigan until '[they've] been to the old-fashioned Cherry Bowl Drive-in in Benzie County, where [they] can sit on cushions in the back of [their] truck on a warm night, munching on the best movie popcorn and chicken fingers in Michigan watching an evening summer movie." In 2013, Honda awarded the theatre a prize, a new digital projector, in its "Project Drive-In" social media campaign. The theater and drive-in are located at 9812 Honor Highway (US 31).

== History ==
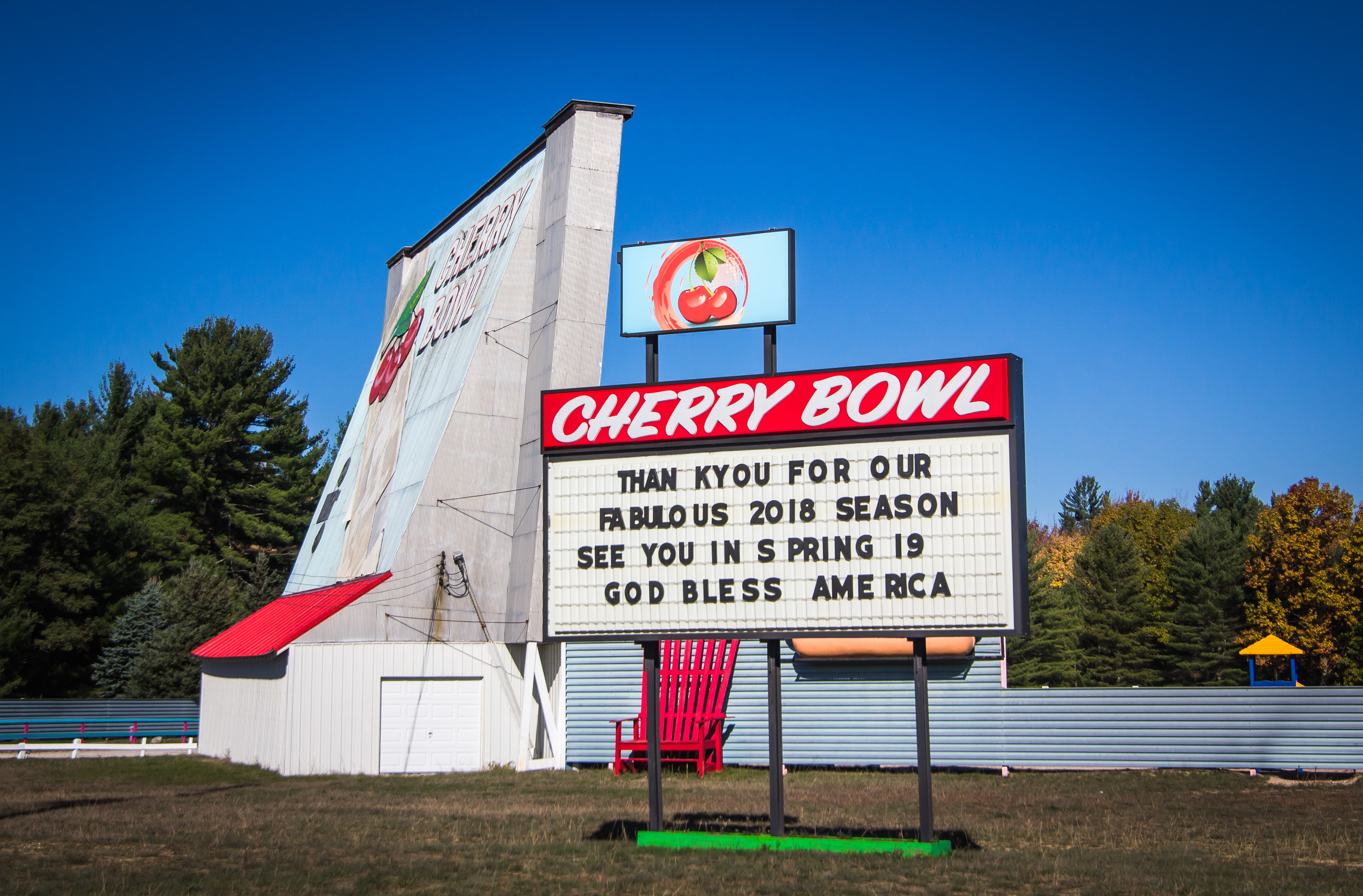
Marquee sign, seen in 2018

The Cherry Bowl opened on July 4, 1953. Longtime owner Jean Griffin ran the business after her husband's death in 1959, and was known for working in high heels. Laura and Harry Clark purchased the property from Jean in 1996. Harry Clark died in 2012, and Laura continued to operate the theatre and concession stand. In February 2024, the Cherry Bowl was put up for sale as Laura Clark chose to retire. In September 2024, it was sold to current owner Mindi Jarman who plans to keep the theatre open and upgrade some outdated elements.

The Cherry Bowl offers mini-golf and double feature films rated PG-13 or below. Harry Clark installed sculptures next to the theater's vintage speakers and 14-foot neon hot dog. One sculpture is a pink and blue Volkswagen with a clown head on it, another is a pink cow with cherries for spots, and there is classic Chevy positioned to look like it is coming through a fence.

== Fare ==
Food offerings include Messy Marvin's chili cheese fries sometimes and caramel apples made daily.

== See also ==
- Cherry Hut
- List of drive-in theaters
