= Cherry Hut =

Restaurant in Beulah, Michigan, US

Coordinates: 44.63534°N 86.08875°W

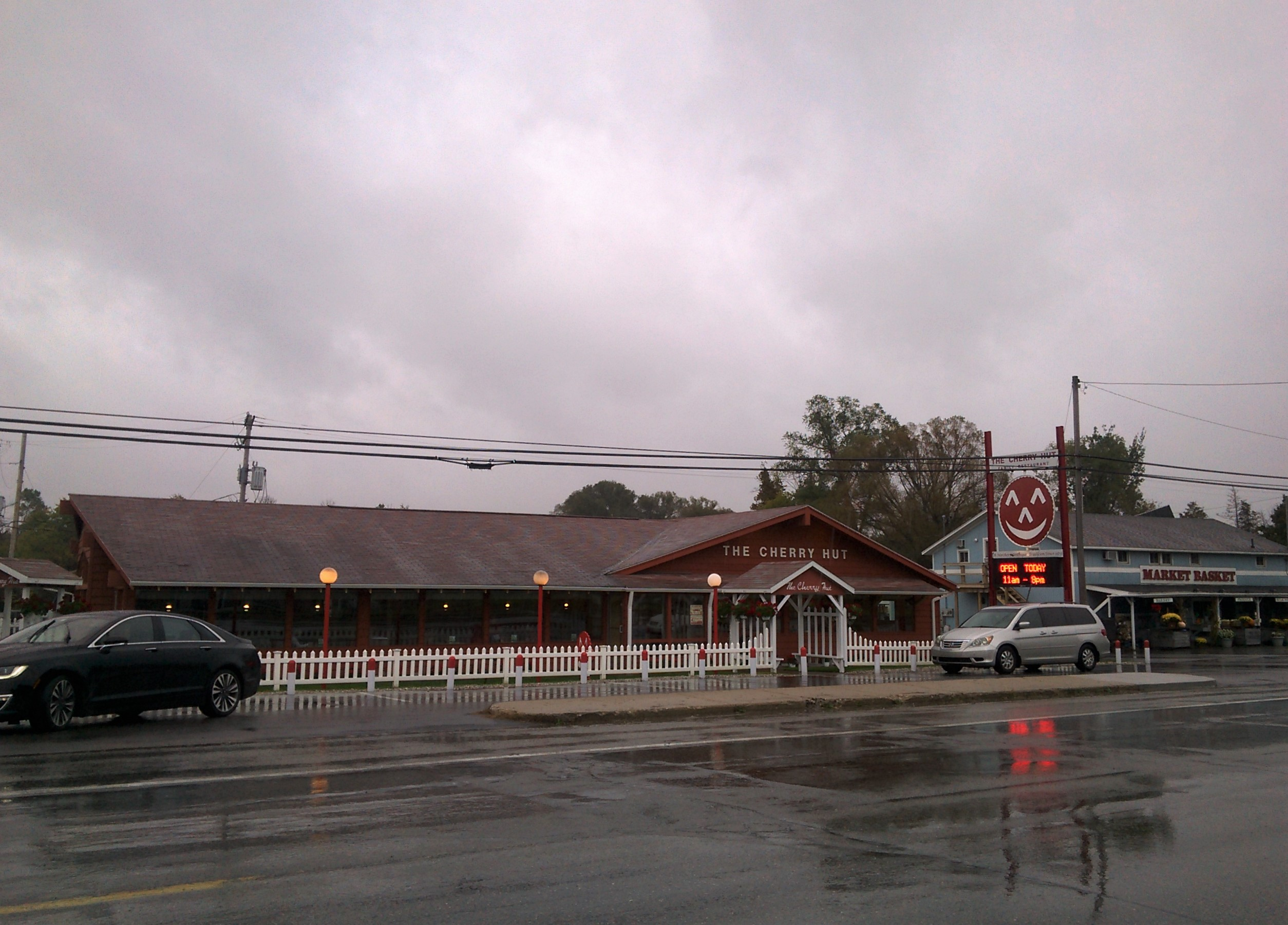
Cherry Hut Restaurant

The Cherry Hut is a restaurant, bakery and store in Beulah, Michigan, known for its cherry pies and cherry hamburgers as well as other products made from locally grown cherries of Northwest Michigan. It was founded in 1922 and has been in Beulah since 1935. The restaurant—open in summers only—is in a town of approximately 350 people in Benzie County and is located at the southeast end of Crystal Lake, about one mile (1.6 km) north of Benzonia on US Highway 31.

It was once just outdoor seating al fresco and served only cherry pie, but eventually added indoor seating and a short menu featuring comfort foods such as biscuit-topped chicken pie and chicken salad with dried tart cherries. The cherry pie is served a la mode, with ice cream, or without. In 2003, the Cherry Hut was using 3,000 pounds of tart cherries per week to make up to 500 pies. Cherry Jerry the "Cheery Cherry Pie-Faced Boy" is the Cherry Hut's mascot and is on a sign north of Beulah. Each pie used to be incised with Cherry Jerry's image. The stand also sells cherry juice and cherry jam.
