= Pilgrim, Michigan =

- Census-designated place (CDP) & unincorporated community
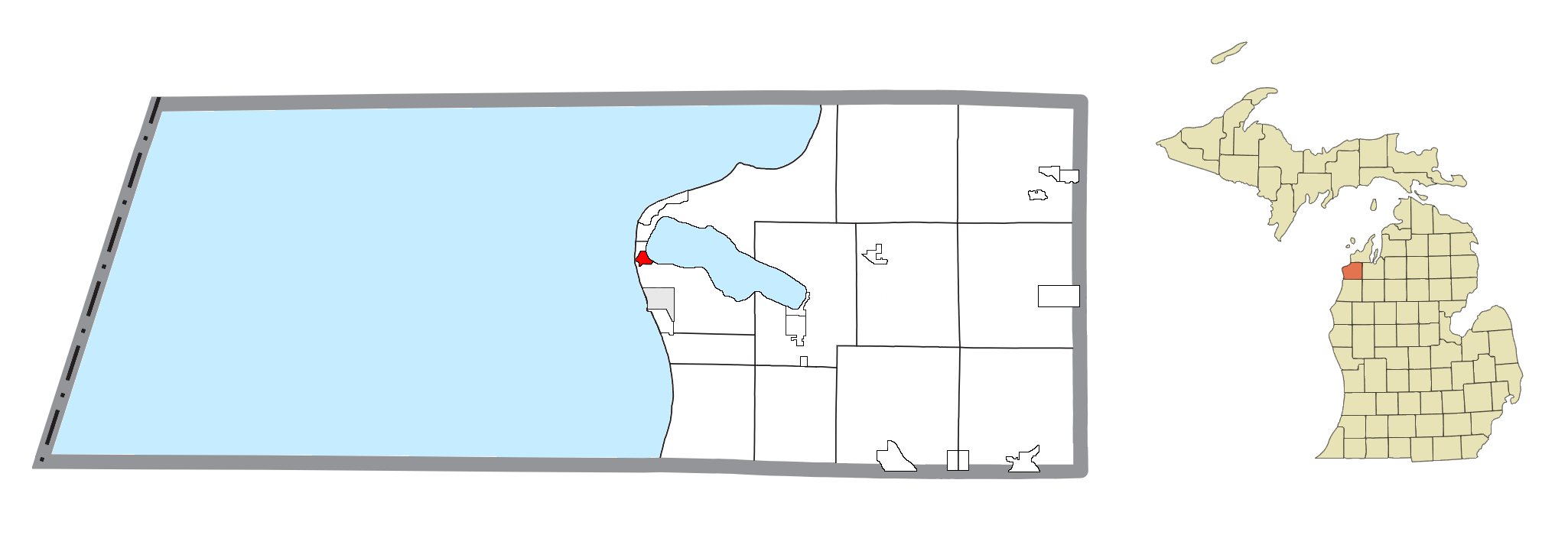
- Location within Benzie County

- Location within the state of Michigan Pilgrim (the United States)
- Coordinates: 44°39′54″N 86°14′46″W
- Country: United States
- State: Michigan
- County: Benzie
- Township: Crystal Lake
- Settled: 1909

Area
  - Total: 0.36 sq mi (0.92 km^{2})
  - Land: 0.36 sq mi (0.92 km^{2})
  - Water: 0 sq mi (0.00 km^{2})
- Elevation: 610 ft (186 m)

Population (2020)
  - Total: 44
  - Density: 120/sq mi (48/km^{2})
- Time zone: UTC-5 (Eastern (EST))
  - Summer (DST): UTC-4 (EDT)
- ZIP code(s): 49635 (Frankfort)
- Area code: 231
- FIPS code: 26-64100
- GNIS feature ID: 0634880

Pilgrim is an unincorporated community and census-designated place (CDP) in Benzie County in the U.S. state of Michigan. As of the 2020 census, the CDP had a permanent population of 44. Pilgrim is located within Crystal Lake Township.

== Geography ==
Pilgrim is located in Crystal Lake Township in western Benzie County. It is situated between Lake Michigan to the west and Crystal Lake to the east. M-22 (Pilgrim Highway) runs through the center of the community, leading south 2 miles (3 km) to the city of Frankfort. The Betsie Dunes Nature Preserve is immediately to the north. As an unincorporated community, Pilgrim is administered by Crystal Lake Township and uses the Frankfort 49635 ZIP Code.

According to the United States Census Bureau, the CDP has a total area of 0.35 square miles (0.9 km^{2}), all land.

== History ==
The community of Pilgrim was listed as a newly-organized census-designated place for the 2010 census, meaning it now has officially defined boundaries and population statistics for the first time. With a permanent population of 44 at the 2020 census, Pilgrim is the least-populated of the 212 census-designated places in Michigan.

== Demographics ==
Historical population
Census	Pop.	Note	%±
2020	44		—
U.S. Decennial Census
