= Crystal Downs Country Club, Michigan =

- Census-designated place (CDP) & unincorporated community
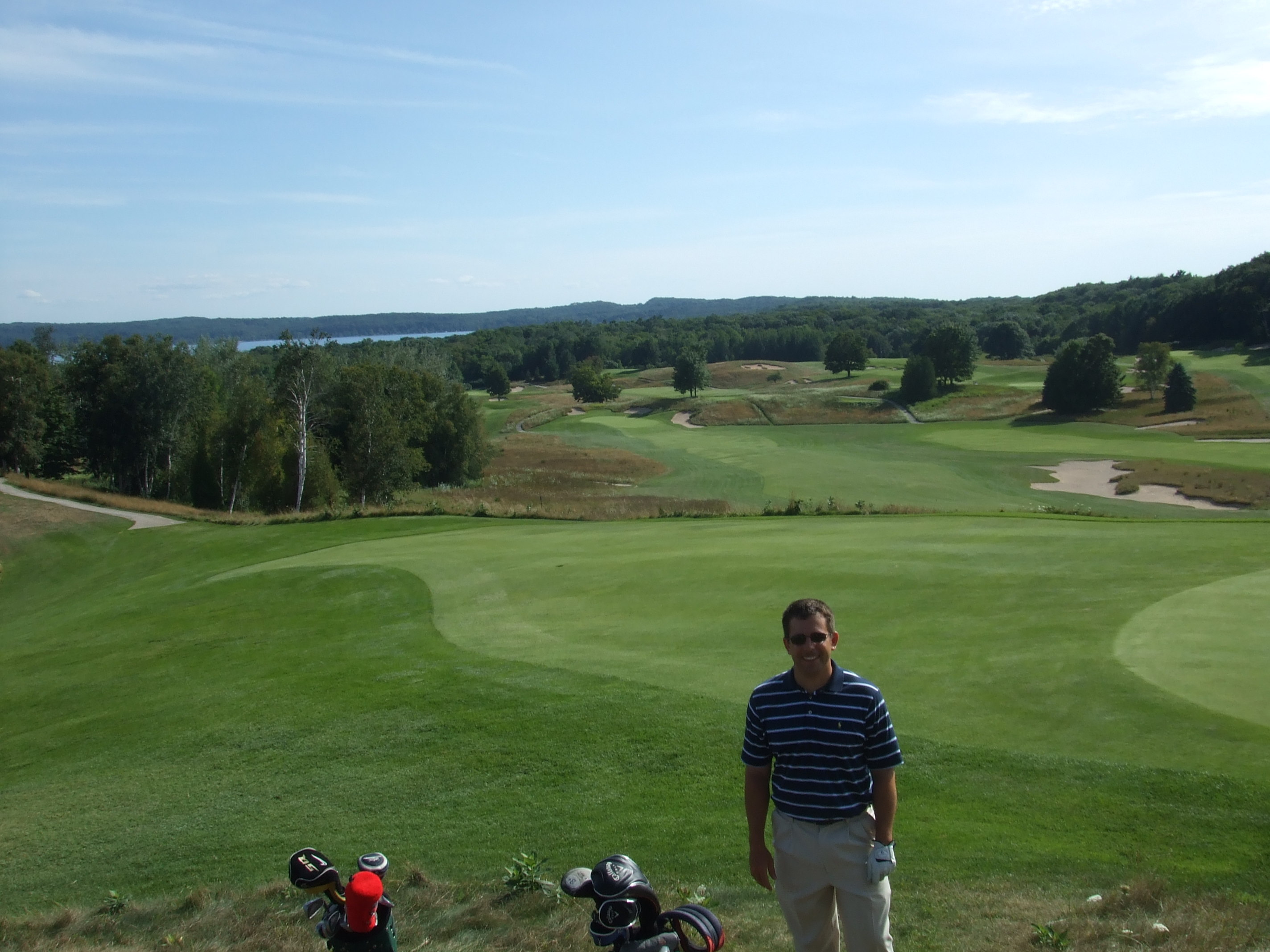
- Crystal Downs County Club golf course

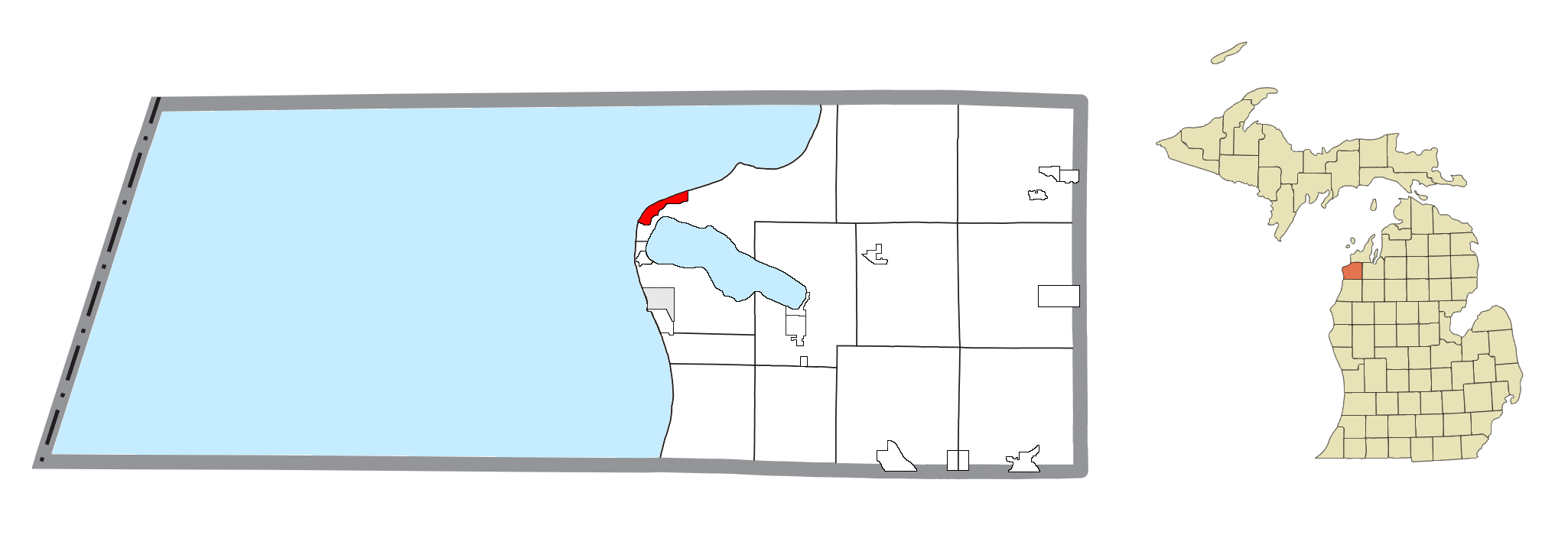
- Location within Benzie County

- Location within the state of Michigan Crystal Downs (the United States)
- Coordinates: 44°44′12″N 86°14′03″W
- Country: United States
- State: Michigan
- County: Benzie
- Township: Lake

Area
  - Total: 1.25 sq mi (3.25 km^{2})
  - Land: 1.25 sq mi (3.25 km^{2})
  - Water: 0 sq mi (0.00 km^{2})
- Elevation: 738 ft (225 m)

Population (2020)
  - Total: 55
  - Density: 43.8/sq mi (16.91/km^{2})
- Time zone: UTC-5 (Eastern (EST))
  - Summer (DST): UTC-4 (EDT)
- ZIP code(s): 49635 (Frankfort)
- Area code: 231
- FIPS code: 26-19135
- GNIS feature ID: 1877506
- Website: Crystal Downs Country Club

Crystal Downs Country Club is a private country club and unincorporated community in Benzie County in the U.S. state of Michigan. The community is located within Lake Township on the shores of Lake Michigan. For statistical purposes, the United States Census Bureau defined the community as a census-designated place for the first time for the 2010 census. As of the 2020 census, Crystal Downs Country Club had a population of 55. The CDP has a total land area of 1.26 square miles (3.3 km^{2}).

Designed by golf course architects Alister MacKenzie and Perry Maxwell in 1929, the par-70, 6,518-yard (5,960 m) course offers views of Lake Michigan and Crystal Lake. The Sleeping Bear Dunes National Lakeshore lies just to its east. Despite being consistently ranked among the top courses in the United States (ranked 10th for 2007–08 by Golf Digest) the only tournament of note it has hosted has been the 1991 U.S. Senior Amateur, due to its location far from population centers and the corresponding lack of sufficient facilities (lodging, transportation, infrastructure) needed to accommodate the crowds attracted by major tournament events. Crystal Downs is currently ranked the #19 course in the world according to Golf.com.

== Demographics ==
Historical population
Census	Pop.	Note	%±
2010	47		—
2020	55		17.0%
U.S. Decennial Census
