= Crystal Beach, Michigan =

There are a few places named Crystal Beach in the U.S. state of Michigan:

- Crystal Beach, Branch County, Michigan, an unincorporated community on Coldwater Lake in Branch County
- A beach on Crystal Lake in Crystal Lake Township, Benzie County
- An unincorporated development area on Lake Michigan in South Haven Charter Township, Van Buren County
