= Benzie Central High School =

Location
- 9300 Homestead Road; Benzonia, Michigan 49616; United States; 44°37′6″N 86°3′11″W

Information
- Type: Public
- Established: 1962
- School district: Benzie County Central Schools
- Superintendent: Amiee Erfourth
- Principal: Cheryl Smith
- Teaching staff: 15.52 (on an FTE basis)
- Grades: 9–12
- Enrollment: 322 (2023–2024)
- Student to teacher ratio: 20.75
- Campus: Rural
- Colors: Red and white
- Athletics conference: Northwest Conference
- Nickname: Huskies
- Rival: Frankfort High School
- Website: benzieschools.net/schools/high-school/

Benzie Central High School is a public high school in Benzonia, Michigan, located at 9300 Homestead Rd. The school offers classes for students in grade 9–12 with an addition of a middle school grade 6-8.

== History ==
In the fall of 1962, the school systems of Benzonia/Beulah, Honor, and Copemish were consolidated into the current Benzie County Central Schools. Classes were held in the old Benzonia High School until 1964, the year that the current junior/senior high school building was opened. Many modifications have been made to the campus over the years, including classroom additions in 1992 and 1997. In 2001, the latest and most dramatic changes came to the facility with the addition of a state of the art auditorium. In 2002, the old auditorium was converted into a band room.

== Academics ==
Benzie Central offers the following AP courses: Biology, Calculus AB, Chemistry, and Literature.

In 2011, Benzie Central High School was recognized by the State Department of Education as a school "Beating the Odds!" Studies were done to find out which schools were performing better than expected, compared to other schools like them. The analysis compared Benzie Central's outcomes (test scores, statewide top-to-bottom ranking, graduation rate) with other schools of similar factors such as grade levels, locale, and student demographics.

== Athletics ==
MHSAA State Championships:

- Boys cross country - 1984, 1985, 1986, 1995, 1997, 2009, 2013, 2014
- Girls cross country - 1982, 1983, 1998, 2008, 2011
- Girls track and field - 1999, 2011
