= Nessen City, Michigan =

- Census-designated place (CDP) & unincorporated community
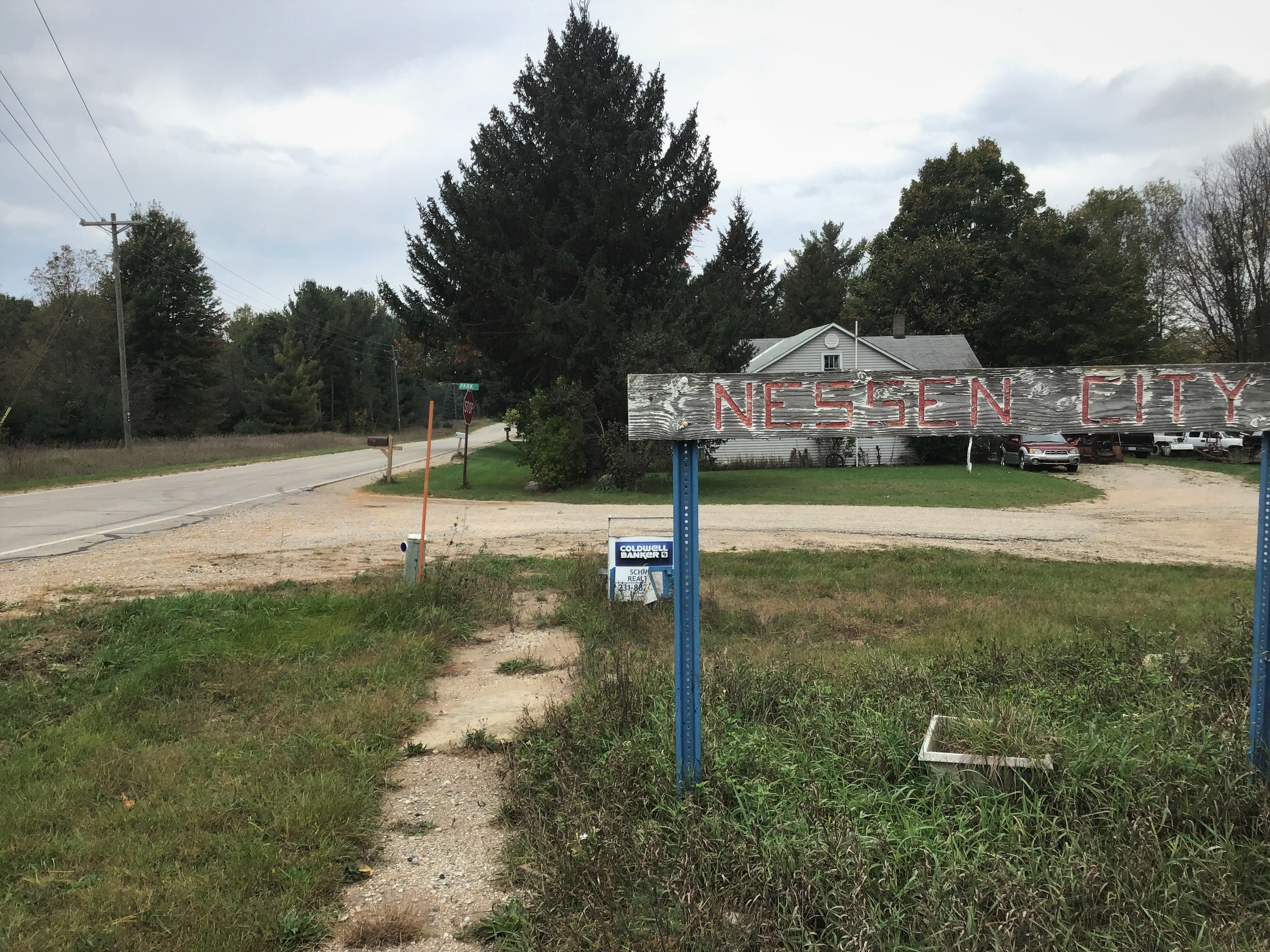
- Nessen City sign

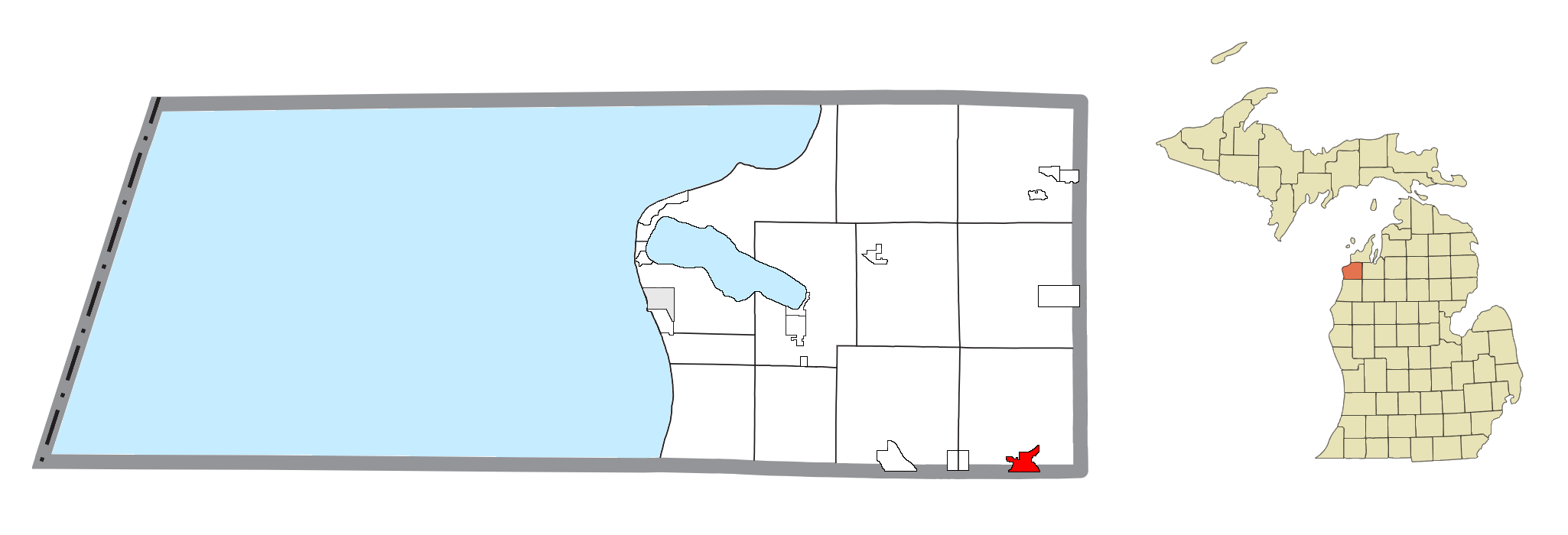
- Location within Benzie County

- Location within the state of Michigan Nessen City (the United States)
- Coordinates: 44°31′12″N 85°52′42″W
- Country: United States
- State: Michigan
- County: Benzie
- Township: Colfax
- Settled: 1889

Area
  - Total: 1.21 sq mi (3.14 km^{2})
  - Land: 1.21 sq mi (3.14 km^{2})
  - Water: 0 sq mi (0.00 km^{2})
- Elevation: 856 ft (261 m)

Population (2020)
  - Total: 81
  - Density: 66.7/sq mi (25.76/km^{2})
- Time zone: UTC-5 (Eastern (EST))
  - Summer (DST): UTC-4 (EDT)
- ZIP code(s): 49683
- Area code: 231
- FIPS code: 26-56960
- GNIS feature ID: 0633296

Nessen City is an unincorporated community and census-designated place in Benzie County in the U.S. state of Michigan. The population was 108 as of 2021. Nessen City is located within Colfax Township, and is located immediately north of the Manistee County line.

== History ==
Nessen City was established as a station on the newly-constructed Manistee and North-Eastern Railroad in 1889. The same year, the community was platted by John and Edith Nessen.

The community of Nessen City was listed as a newly-organized census-designated place for the 2010 census, meaning it now has officially defined boundaries and population statistics for the first time.

== Geography ==
Nessen City is located along the southern border of Colfax Township in southeastern Benzie County. The southern border of the CDP is along the Manistee County line. The center of the community is at the intersection of Lindy Road and Karlin Road (north)/Nessen Road (south). The community is 3 miles (5 km) east of the village of Thompsonville and 3.8 miles (6.1 km) northeast of the village of Copemish.

According to the United States Census Bureau, the CDP has a total area of 1.2 square miles (3.1 km^{2}), all land.

== Economy ==
Nessen City, MI sustains a workforce of 28 individuals, with its economy revolving around several key industries. The primary sectors in Nessen City are Manufacturing, employing 14 individuals, followed by Health Care & Social Assistance with 7 employees, and Finance & Insurance with 4 personnel. Notably, Manufacturing stands out as the highest-paying industry in the region, offering an average salary of $54,167, while the overall average salary across all sectors is $36,250.

== Demographics ==
Historical population
Census	Pop.	Note	%±
2010	97		—
2020	81		−16.5%
U.S. Decennial Census
