= USS LST-266 =

1943 LST-1-class tank landing ship

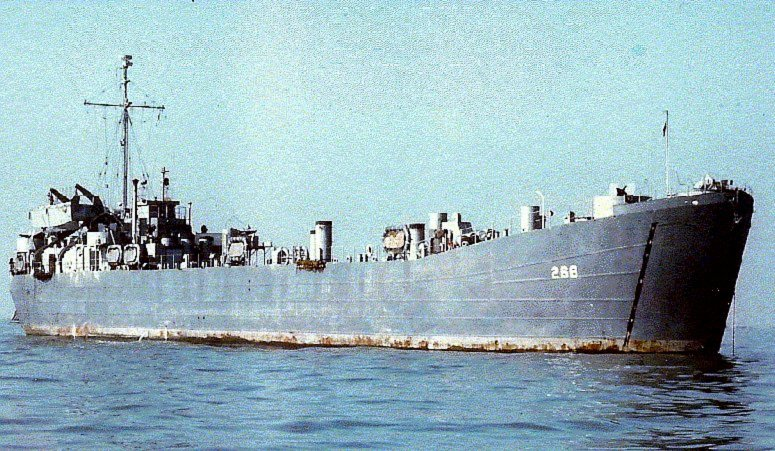

History

United States
- Name: USS LST-266
- Builder: American Bridge Company, Ambridge, Pennsylvania
- Laid down: 11 November 1942
- Launched: 16 May 1943
- Commissioned: 4 August 1943
- Decommissioned: 18 June 1947
- Honors and awards: 2 battle stars (WWII)
- Renamed: USS Benzie County, 1 July 1955
- Namesake: Benzie County, Michigan
- Stricken: 1 November 1958
- Fate: Sold for scrapping, 4 August 1959

General characteristics
- Class & type: LST-1-class tank landing ship
- Displacement: 1,625 long tons (1,651 t) light; 4,080 long tons (4,145 t) full
- Length: 328 ft (100 m)
- Beam: 50 ft (15 m)
- Draft: Unloaded: Bow: 2 ft 4 in (0.71 m); Stern: 7 ft 6 in (2.29 m); Loaded : Bow: 8 ft 2 in (2.49 m); Stern: 14 ft 1 in (4.29 m)
- Depth: 8 ft (2.4 m) forward, 14 ft 4 in (4.37 m) aft (full load)
- Propulsion: 2 General Motors 12-567 diesel engines, two shafts, twin rudders
- Speed: 12 knots (22 km/h; 14 mph)
- Boats & landing craft carried: Two or six LCVPs
- Troops: 14–16 officers, 131–147 enlisted men
- Complement: 7–9 officers, 104–120 enlisted men
- Armament: 2 × twin 40 mm gun mounts w/Mk.51 directors; 4 × single 40 mm gun mounts; 12 × single 20 mm gun mounts

USS Benzie County (LST-266) was an LST-1-class tank landing ship built for the United States Navy during World War II. Named for Benzie County, Michigan, she was the only U.S. Naval vessel to bear the name.

LST-266 was laid down on 11 November 1942 at Ambridge, Pennsylvania by the American Bridge Company; launched on 16 May 1943; sponsored by Mrs. Joseph B. Barnwell; accepted and placed in reduced commission on 24 July 1943; departed Ambridge on 25 July 1943; and commissioned at New Orleans, Louisiana on 4 August 1943.

== Service history ==
After fitting out, LST-266 carried out her shakedown training in St. Andrews Bay until 28 August when she set out for Key West, Florida. Arriving there on 30 August, she joined coastal convoy KN-262 on 1 September and reached Little Creek, Virginia soon thereafter for operations in the Norfolk area and at Solomons Island, Maryland. The tank landing ship continued in the Hampton Roads region for the rest of 1943 and well into 1944.

=== North Africa, March–April 1944 ===
On 14 March 1944 she sailed for Tunisia as part of Task Force (TF) 64, in convoy UGS-36, 72 merchantmen and 18 tank landing ships shepherded by 16 warships. The escorts drove off a suspected U-boat late on 31 March, but danger from above replaced that from below just six hours later when 22 German aircraft attacked the convoy early on 1 April. In the ensuing action, the screen downed two enemy planes and probably damaged two others. As a result, UGS-36 reached its destination, Bizerte, on 3 April. LST-266 then stood out of that port on 12 April and made Oran, Algeria, on the 16th. From there, she sailed for the United Kingdom on 20 April in convoy MKS-46, reporting to the 12th Fleet for duty upon her arrival in British waters on 3 May 1944.

=== Invasion of France, 7–17 June 1944 ===
A little over a month later, LST-266 (as LST Flotilla 4 flagship) took part in Operation Neptune, the invasion of France. On 5 June, the tank landing ship departed Falmouth, England for the assault area in Task Group (TG) 126.4 made up of 40 LSTs, 35 of which towed pontoon causeways. The Channel's characteristic strong winds and heavy tidal currents made station keeping hazardous; but eventually, at 0800 on the 7th, TG 126.4 reached the invasion beaches; and LST-266 dropped anchor off the "Fox Green" section of Omaha Beach. Despite a choppy sea, the ship dispatched her first loaded landing craft, an LCM, to the beach at 1120; but the rough sea finally forced a pause in unloading at 1345. With 184 troops and 84 vehicles still on board, LST-266 persuaded a tank landing craft (LCT) to "marry" to her bow so that unloading could resume, an evolution aided by providentially calm wind and sea conditions. After three LCTs had been loaded and dispatched to the beach, more remained on board to send. Her executive officer, Lt. Wilbur H. Lundell, took a small boat out to look for a Rhino Ferry to speed the unloading. His hunt bore fruit; and, after marrying the Rhino Ferry to her bow at 2323, LST-266 completed her unloading at 0130 on the 8th.

Later that day, LST-266 received orders to stand out for onward routing. "Ducking and dodging" convoys of LCTs on the return voyage, LST-266, one of 42 LSTs in convoy, reached the Isle of Portland on the morning of the 9th. From there, she accompanied 11 other tank landing ships to Tilbury Docks to load cargo, arriving there early on 12 June. Embarking 273 British troops and 72 vehicles, LST-266 anchored briefly in the River Thames before joining an out-bound convoy, ETM-8, in the late afternoon of the 13th. Arriving off Sword Beach, in the British sector, at 2245 on 14 June, LST-266 beached herself on "Queen Red" Beach, four miles west of Ouistreham, France at 0830 on the 15th along with five other U.S. tank landing ships. "Until 0930," wrote Lieutenant Logan A. Bolon, USNR, LST-266's captain, "the beach was peaceful and free of enemy action, but at 0930 the peacefulness took a hasty departure, no doubt hurried along by the burst of an enemy shell five hundred yards on the port quarter." As the tide receded enough to allow unloading, the Germans increased the tempo of their gunfire accordingly. Over the next few hours, enemy long-range guns methodically sowed the beach with shells. "I am fully convinced," Bolon recounted, "that those manning the enemy guns were extremely capable and not green horns at the game. The range and deflection was good and salvoes varied from one to four. This vessel received one direct hit...and enough near misses to scare the daylights out of us..."

Shortly before 1130, the nearby LST-207 took a direct hit, and immediately requested medical assistance. LST-266 provided a doctor and 14 pharmacist's mates to help the wounded; soon thereafter, at 1137, LST-266 herself took a hit at the normal load waterline, in a main ballast tank. About ten minutes later, the tank landing ships received orders to evacuate all hands save skeleton crews. At 1150, LST-266's crew went ashore and sought cover for the duration of the shelling, leaving behind a seven-man repair party, four motor machinist's mates, one chief pharmacist's mate, a doctor and two other officers. Even British warships, brought into the area a little over half an hour later, failed to silence the enemy guns which continued to lob shells at the LSTs until 1630, inflicting damage on five of the six.

Although she had dispatched her last vehicle to the beach at 1325, LST-266 could not retract from the beach because of the extreme tide conditions. Those men who had been evacuated returned a little over an hour later; and, at 1600, the tank landing ship began making all preparations for getting underway. Retracting soon thereafter on the second attempt, LST-266 proceeded to the out-bound convoy anchorage area and, from there, headed back to England, entering Portsmouth at 0235 on 17 June. Her repeated requests for repairs at British facilities ignored, LST-266 had to take matters into her own hands, and her own ship's force repaired the shell damage within 24 hours.

=== Return to the US, 1945 ===
LST-266 remained in European waters, carrying out cross-channel missions, into the spring of 1945. She then moved to Belfast in Northern Ireland where she joined a homeward-bound convoy, ONS 50, on 11 May, with LCT-527 nested on board. Detached from the convoy on the 27th, LST-266 proceeded to Norfolk, arriving there on the 31st to unload the landing craft and undergo voyage repairs. Although earmarked for Pacific service, LST-266 never reached that theater, spending the rest of her active days in the Atlantic. Following an availability at Norfolk during the summer of 1945, the tank landing ship steamed to New York, where she loaded LCT-706 and the stern section of LCT-600. After carrying that cargo to Hampton Roads and unloading it at the Norfolk Naval Shipyard, she returned to New York immediately to load LCT-766 for transportation to Jacksonville, Florida.

=== Decommissioning and disposal ===
Arriving at Green Cove Springs, Florida on 2 October 1945, she reported for duty with the Atlantic Reserve Fleet that same day. On 18 June 1947, LST-266 was decommissioned and placed in service, in reserve. A week later, on 25 June 1947, she was placed out of commission, in reserve. Towed from Mayport, Florida to Charleston, South Carolina by the Tunica three weeks later, LST-266 remained at the Charleston Naval Shipyard until 11 September when the Umpqua towed her back to Mayport.

On 1 July 1955, the tank landing ship was named USS Benzie County (LST-266), but never served actively under the name. On 1 November 1958 her name was struck from the Naval Vessel Register, and she was sold to the Fleet Storage Company on 4 August 1959 for scrapping. LST-266 earned two battle stars for World War II service.
