= Grand Traverse Regional Land Conservancy =

U.S. conservation organization

- Type: Nonprofit
- Tax ID no.: 38-2994229
- Legal status: 501(c)(3)
- Headquarters: Traverse City, Michigan
- Location: United States
- Region served: Northwestern Lower Peninsula of Michigan (Antrim, Benzie, Grand Traverse, Kalkaska, and Manistee counties)
- Board Chair: Kevin Russell
- Executive Director: Glen Chown
- Board of directors: Kevin Russell; Kathleen Guy; Linda Cline; John Bercini; Perry Adams; Don Coe; John Collins; JoAnne Cook; Cortney Danbrook; Clifford G. Fox, CFA; Koffi Kpachavi; Chip May, Paul Moyer; Barbara Nelson-Jameson; Annie Olds; Susan Palmer; Evan Smith; Maureen Smyth; Terrie Taylor
- Website: https://www.gtrlc.org/

The Grand Traverse Regional Land Conservancy (GTRLC) is a 501(c)(3) non-profit organization based in Traverse City, Michigan. It is an independent organization with its own by-laws, policies, board, staff, and budget. The organization is funded by private donors as well as local, state, and national foundations. The Grand Traverse Regional Land Conservancy has a volunteer Board of Directors and a year-round, full-time professional staff.

== Foundation ==
In 1991, Rotary Charities of Traverse City determined that protecting natural resources was critical to the region's quality of life and created a four-county steering committee designed to establish a local land trust. As a result, the Grand Traverse Regional Land Conservancy was born. Since then, the organization has worked to protect the important and significant landscapes that make Michigan's Antrim, Benzie, Grand Traverse, Kalkaska, and Manistee counties unique.

== Mission ==
The GTRLC focuses land conservation efforts to permanently protect crucial wildlife habitat and corridors; critical watersheds, which protect the water quality of northern Michigan; unique high-quality farm lands; valuable forestland; and ecologically significant dunes along Lake Michigan's beautiful and endangered shore. We protect land in several ways:

- By working with landowners to permanently protect private land through voluntary conservation easements
- By acquiring high quality natural lands; some of these lands are the "best of the best" and become nature preserves which are open to the public
- By assisting local units of government with land transfers that result in enhanced public access to nature and improved recreational opportunities
- By providing technical assistance to local units of government with the administration of farmland protection programs

== Accomplishments ==
As of early 2020, the Conservancy had protected roughly 44,000 acres of natural, scenic, and farm lands and over 130 miles of shoreline along the region's exceptional rivers, lakes, and streams through land acquisition, conservation easements, and land transfers.

The Grand Traverse Regional Land Conservancy has assisted more than a dozen units of government in creating or expanding public natural areas and parks. Since 1991, the organization has helped secure over $67 million from the Michigan Department of Natural Resources Trust Fund on behalf of community-led land conservation efforts across its service region.

== State and national partners ==
The Grand Traverse Regional Land Conservancy is one of many independent land trusts across the U.S. GTRLC's work is part of a broader network of conservation. GTRLC is a member of the Heart of the Lakes Center for Land Conservation, which acts as a legislative liaison in the State of Michigan and coordinates and promotes sound land preservation policies. GTRLC is also a member of the Land Trust Alliance, a Washington, D.C.–based organization which performs a similar role with the U.S. Congress and appropriate departments of the Federal Government.
