= Crystal Lake Township, Michigan =

- Civil township
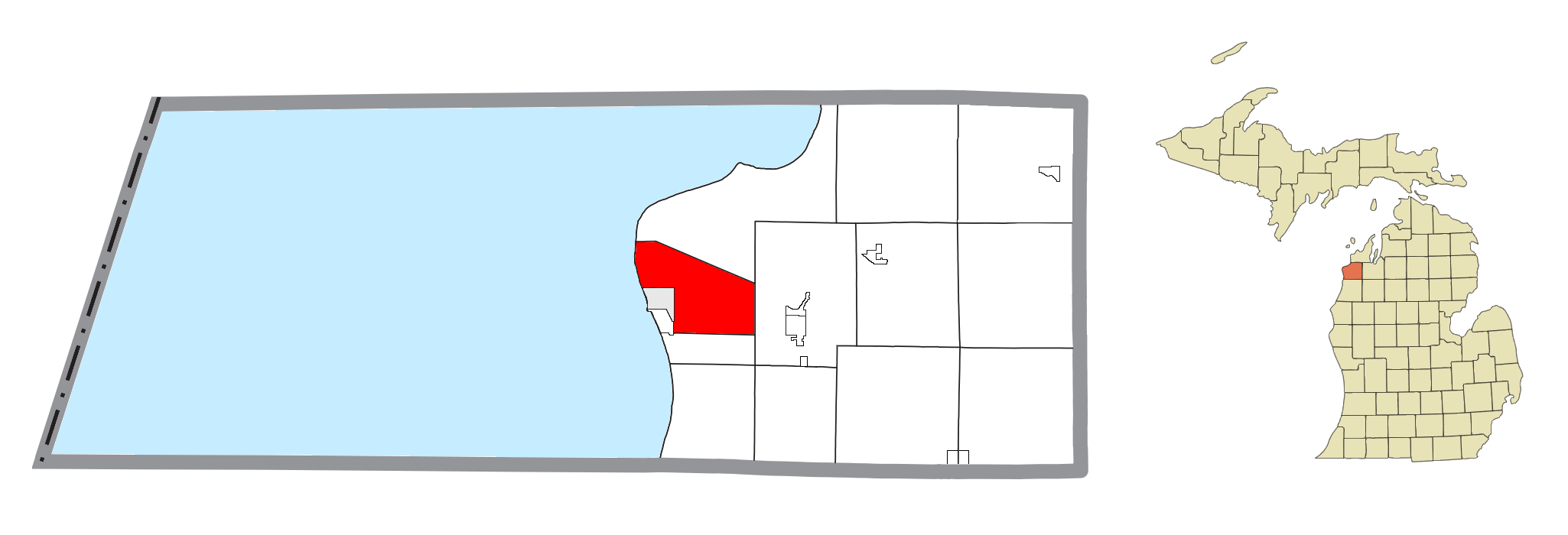
- Location within Benzie County

- Location within the state of Michigan Crystal Lake Township (the United States)
- Coordinates: 44°38′38″N 86°12′35″W
- Country: United States
- State: Michigan
- County: Benzie

Government
  - Supervisor: Amy Ferris

Area
  - Total: 17.1 sq mi (44.2 km^{2})
  - Land: 12.5 sq mi (32.5 km^{2})
  - Water: 4.5 sq mi (11.7 km^{2})
- Elevation: 807 ft (246 m)

Population (2020)
  - Total: 1,065
  - Density: 76/sq mi (29.4/km^{2})
- Time zone: UTC-5 (Eastern (EST))
  - Summer (DST): UTC-4 (EDT)
- ZIP code(s): 49635
- Area code: 231
- FIPS code: 26-19180
- GNIS feature ID: 1626148
- Website: Official website

Crystal Lake Township is a civil township of Benzie County in the U.S. state of Michigan. The population was 1,065 at the 2020 census.

== Geography ==
According to the United States Census Bureau, the township has a total area of 17.1 square miles (44.2 km^{2}), of which 12.5 square miles (32.5 km^{2}) is land and 4.5 square miles (11.7 km^{2}), or 26.48%, is water.

Crystal Lake Township contains shores on both Lake Michigan and the eponymous Crystal Lake. Additionally, the Betsie River flows through the south of the township.

== Communities ==
- Crystallia is an unincorporated community in the northwest of the township, on the western shore of Crystal Lake, located at 44°40′23″N 86°14′51″W. The settlement was established in 1895.
- The city of Frankfort, the largest municipality in Benzie County, is immediately adjacent Crystal Lake Township.
- Pilgrim, a census-designated place, is located within the northwest of Crystal Lake Township.

== Demographics ==
As of the census of 2000, there were 960 people, 414 households, and 303 families residing in the township. The population density was 74.9 inhabitants per square mile (28.9/km^{2}). There were 1,051 housing units at an average density of 82.0 per square mile (31.7/km^{2}). The racial makeup of the township was 98.02% White, 0.73% Native American, 0.62% Asian, and 0.62% from two or more races. Hispanic or Latino of any race were 0.73% of the population.

There were 414 households, out of which 25.8% had children under the age of 18 living with them, 63.5% were married couples living together, 6.3% had a female householder with no husband present, and 26.6% were non-families. 23.7% of all households were made up of individuals, and 11.6% had someone living alone who was 65 years of age or older. The average household size was 2.31 and the average family size was 2.72.

In the township the population was spread out, with 20.5% under the age of 18, 4.5% from 18 to 24, 20.6% from 25 to 44, 29.9% from 45 to 64, and 24.5% who were 65 years of age or older. The median age was 48 years. For every 100 females, there were 98.8 males. For every 100 females age 18 and over, there were 95.6 males.

The median income for a household in the township was $36,528, and the median income for a family was $44,643. Males had a median income of $28,977 versus $20,982 for females. The per capita income for the township was $20,987. About 4.9% of families and 5.3% of the population were below the poverty line, including 7.1% of those under age 18 and 4.2% of those age 65 or over.
