= Lake Township, Benzie County, Michigan =

Lake Township, Michigan
- Civil township
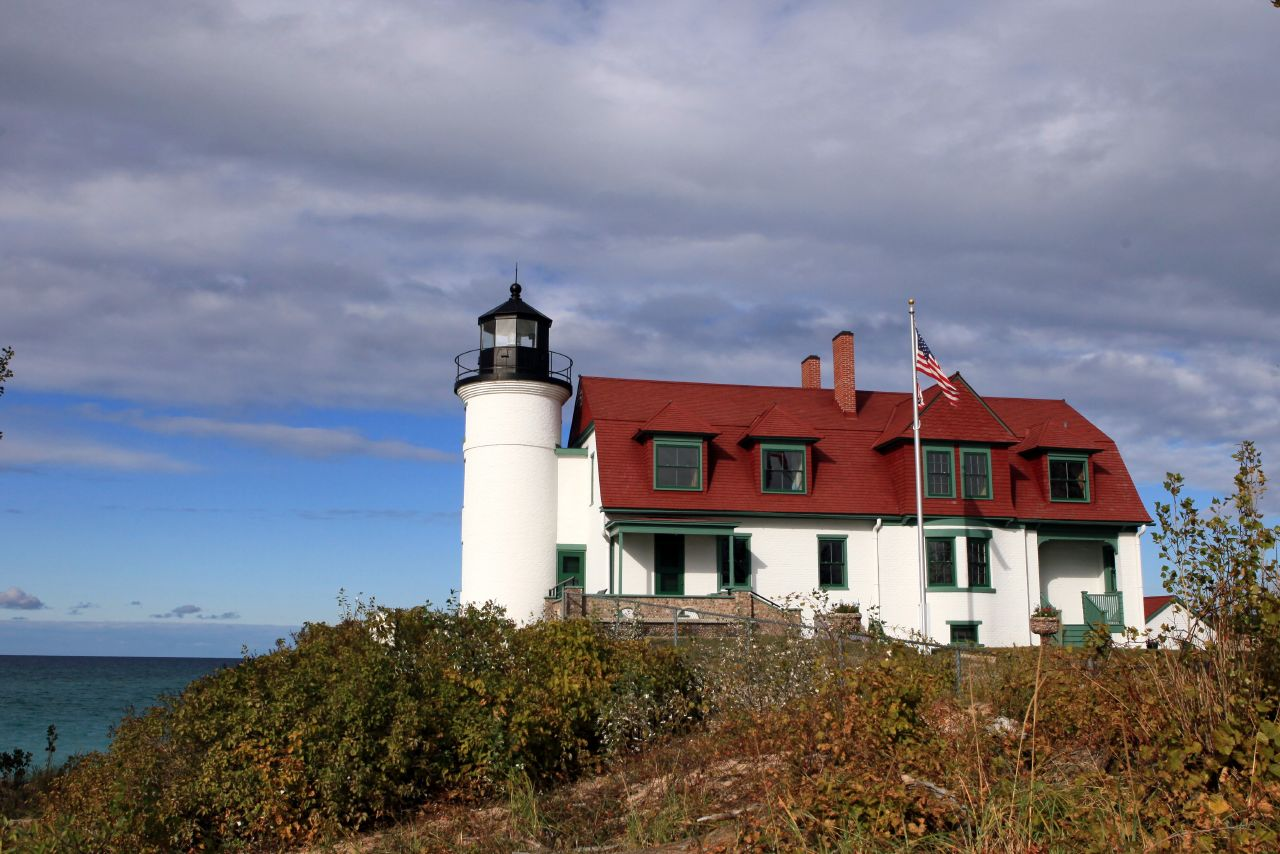
- Point Betsie Light overlooking Lake Michigan

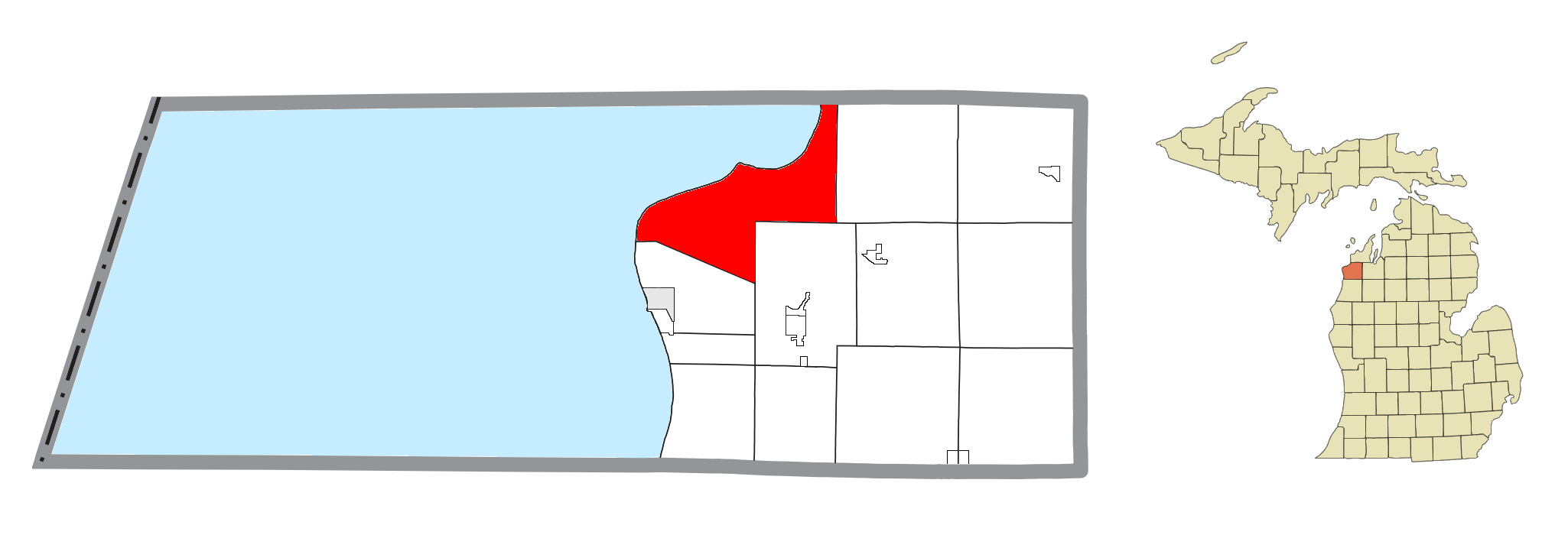
- Location within Benzie County

- Location within the state of Michigan Lake Township (the United States)
- Coordinates: 44°41′56″N 86°08′17″W
- Country: United States
- State: Michigan
- County: Benzie

Government
  - Supervisor: Anna Grobe

Area
  - Total: 35.1 sq mi (91.0 km^{2})
  - Land: 23.4 sq mi (60.6 km^{2})
  - Water: 11.7 sq mi (30.4 km^{2})
- Elevation: 597 ft (182 m)

Population (2020)
  - Total: 694
  - Density: 32/sq mi (12.5/km^{2})
- Time zone: UTC-5 (Eastern (EST))
  - Summer (DST): UTC-4 (EDT)
- ZIP code(s): 49617, 49635, 49640
- Area code: 231
- FIPS code: 26-44240
- GNIS feature ID: 1626572
- Website: Official website

Lake Township is a civil township of Benzie County in the U.S. state of Michigan. The population was 694 at the 2020 census. The township is irregularly shaped, following the shore of Lake Michigan from Crystal Lake north to the border with Leelanau County. A portion of the Sleeping Bear Dunes National Lakeshore is located in the northern end of the township.

== Communities ==
- Aral is a ghost town that was built at the mouth of Otter Creek on Lake Michigan in 1880. It was built around the Otter Creek Lumber Mill. It was named after Aral, Ireland, because "Otter Creek" was already the name of another place in Michigan. It had a post office from 1884 until 1900. It can be found at 44°45′44″N 86°4′29.3″W.
- Crystal Downs Country Club is a census-designated place in the west of the township.

== Geography ==
According to the United States Census Bureau, the township has a total area of 35.1 square miles (91.0 km^{2}), of which 23.4 square miles (60.6 km^{2}) is land and 11.7 square miles (30.4 km^{2}), or 33.41%, is water.

Lake Township contains long shores on both Lake Michigan and Crystal Lake, making the township a popular vacation and tourism destination.

The mouth of the Platte River at Lake Michigan is located within the township. It can be found at 44°43′54″N 86°9′10″W.

=== Major highway ===
- M-22 runs primarily west–east through the township, paralleling the coast of Lake Michigan.

== Demographics ==
As of the 2000 census, there were 635 people, 318 households and 227 families residing in the township. The population density was 26.8 inhabitants per square mile (10.3/km^{2}). There were 1,106 housing units at an average density of 46.7 per square mile (18.0/km^{2}). The racial makeup of the township was 98.43% White, 0.79% Native American, and 0.79% from two or more races. Hispanic or Latino of any race were 0.31% of the population.

There were 318 households, of which 10.1% had children under the age of 18 living with them, 68.9% were married couples living together, 1.6% had a female householder with no husband present, and 28.6% were non-families. 24.8% of all households were made up of individuals, and 14.8% had someone living alone who was 65 years of age or older. The average household size was 2.00 and the average family size was 2.32.

9.4% of the population were under the age of 18, 2.4% from 18 to 24, 12.9% from 25 to 44, 35.9% from 45 to 64, and 39.4% who were 65 years of age or older. The median age was 61 years. For every 100 females, there were 99.1 males. For every 100 females age 18 and over, there were 98.3 males.

The median household income was $46,979 and the median family income was $53,194. Males had a median income of $46,250 compared with $32,083 for females. The per capita income was $31,021. About 0.9% of families and 2.6% of the population were below the poverty line, including none of those under age 18 and 0.8% of those age 65 or over.
