= Benzie County, Michigan =

County in Michigan, United States

- County
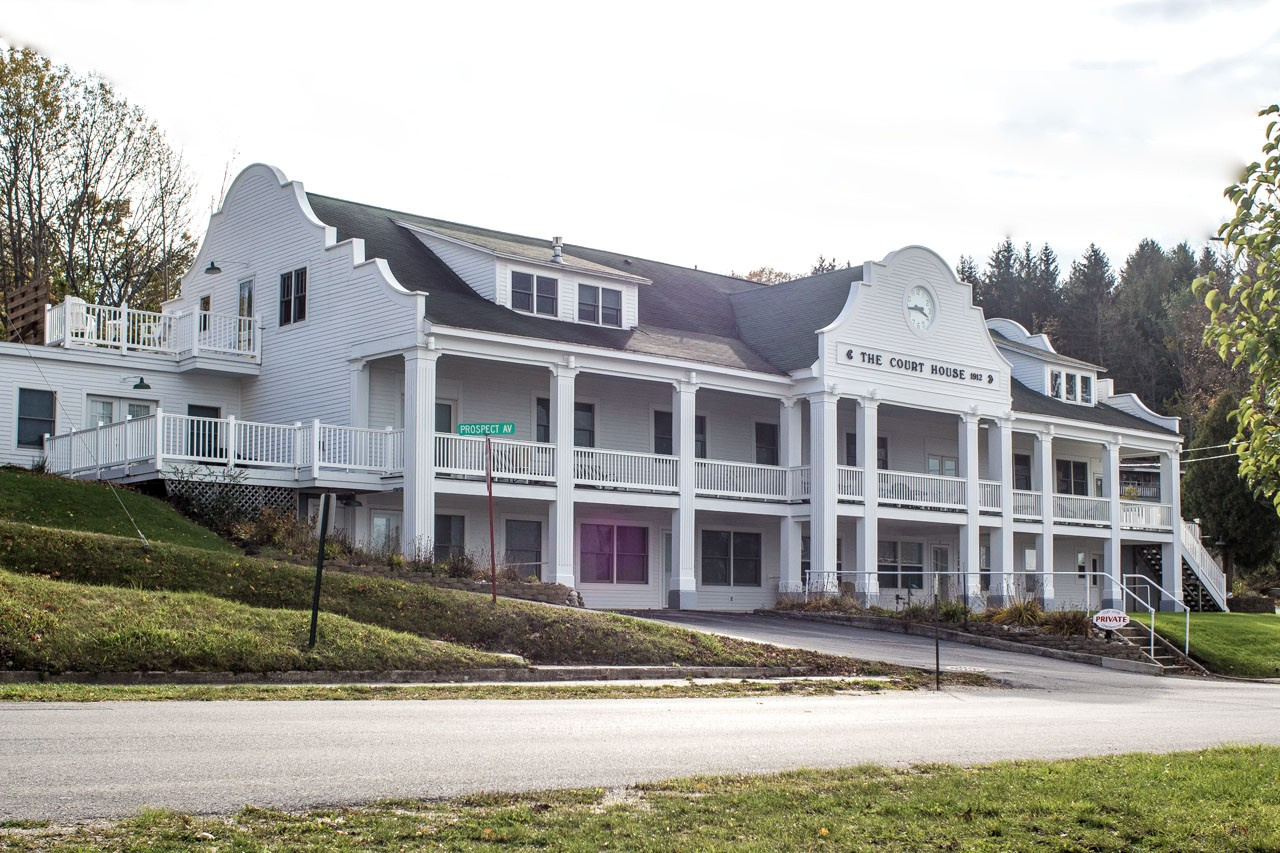
- Old Benzie County Courthouse in Beulah

- Location within the U.S. state of Michigan
- Coordinates: 44°38′N 86°15′W
- Country: United States
- State: Michigan
- Created: 1863
- Organized: 1869
- Named for: Betsie River
- Seat: Beulah
- Largest city: Frankfort

Area
  - Total: 860 sq mi (2,200 km^{2})
  - Land: 320 sq mi (830 km^{2})
  - Water: 540 sq mi (1,400 km^{2}) 63%

Population (2020)
  - Total: 17,970
  - Estimate (2025): 18,568 ▲
  - Density: 55/sq mi (21/km^{2})
- Time zone: UTC−5 (Eastern)
  - Summer (DST): UTC−4 (EDT)
- Congressional district: 1st
- Website: www.benzieco.net

Benzie County (/ˈbɛnziː/ BEN-zee) is a county in the U.S. state of Michigan. As of the 2020 census, the population was 17,970. The county seat is Beulah. The county was initially set off in 1863 and organized in 1869. At 321 square miles (830 km^{2}), Benzie County is the smallest of the 83 counties in Michigan in terms of land area. Benzie County is home to the City of Frankfort which sits on the shores of Lake Michigan.

Part of the Sleeping Bear Dunes National Lakeshore is located within Benzie county. It is also home to Crystal Mountain, one of Michigan's top-rated ski resorts.

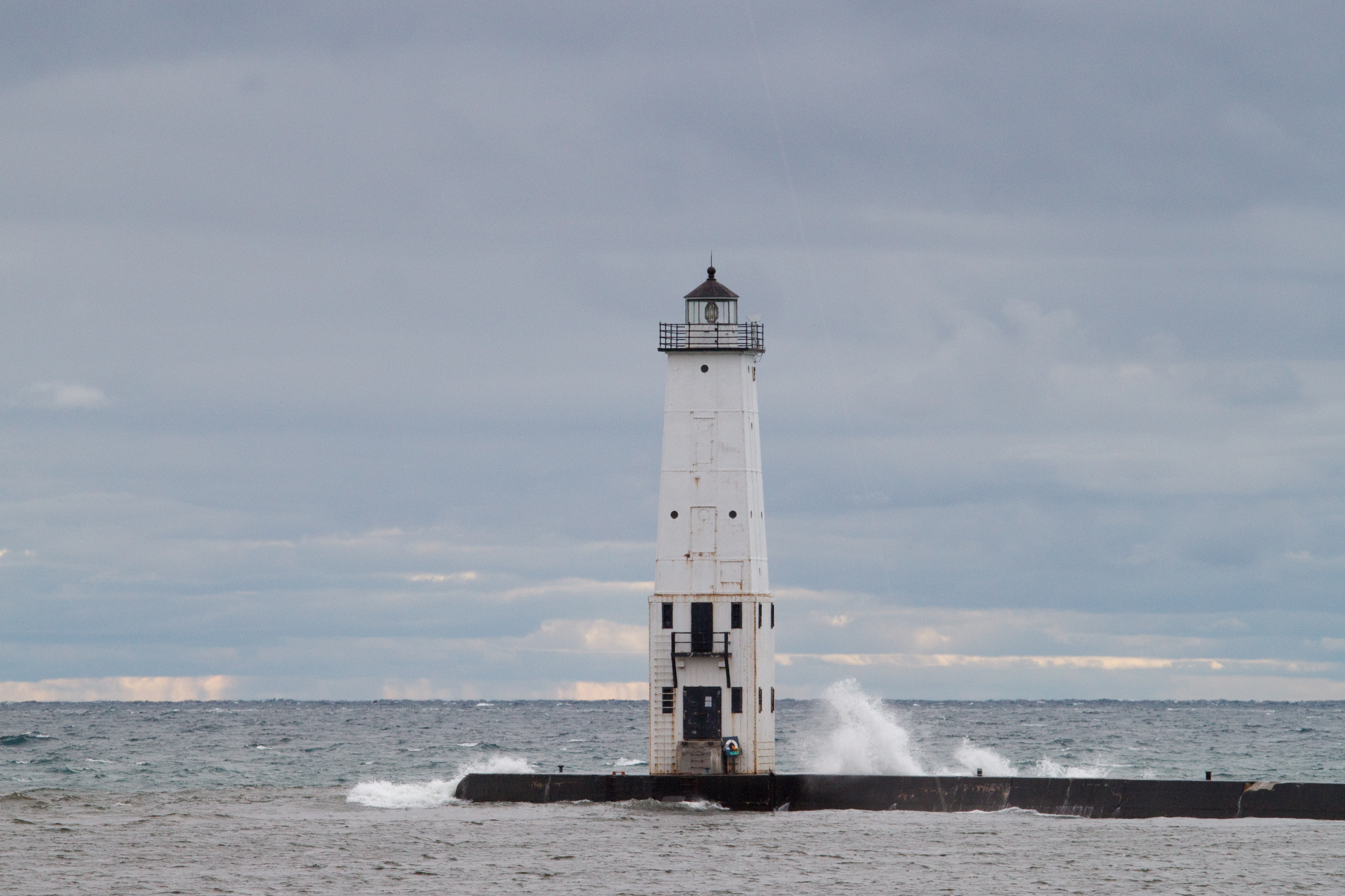
Frankfort Light

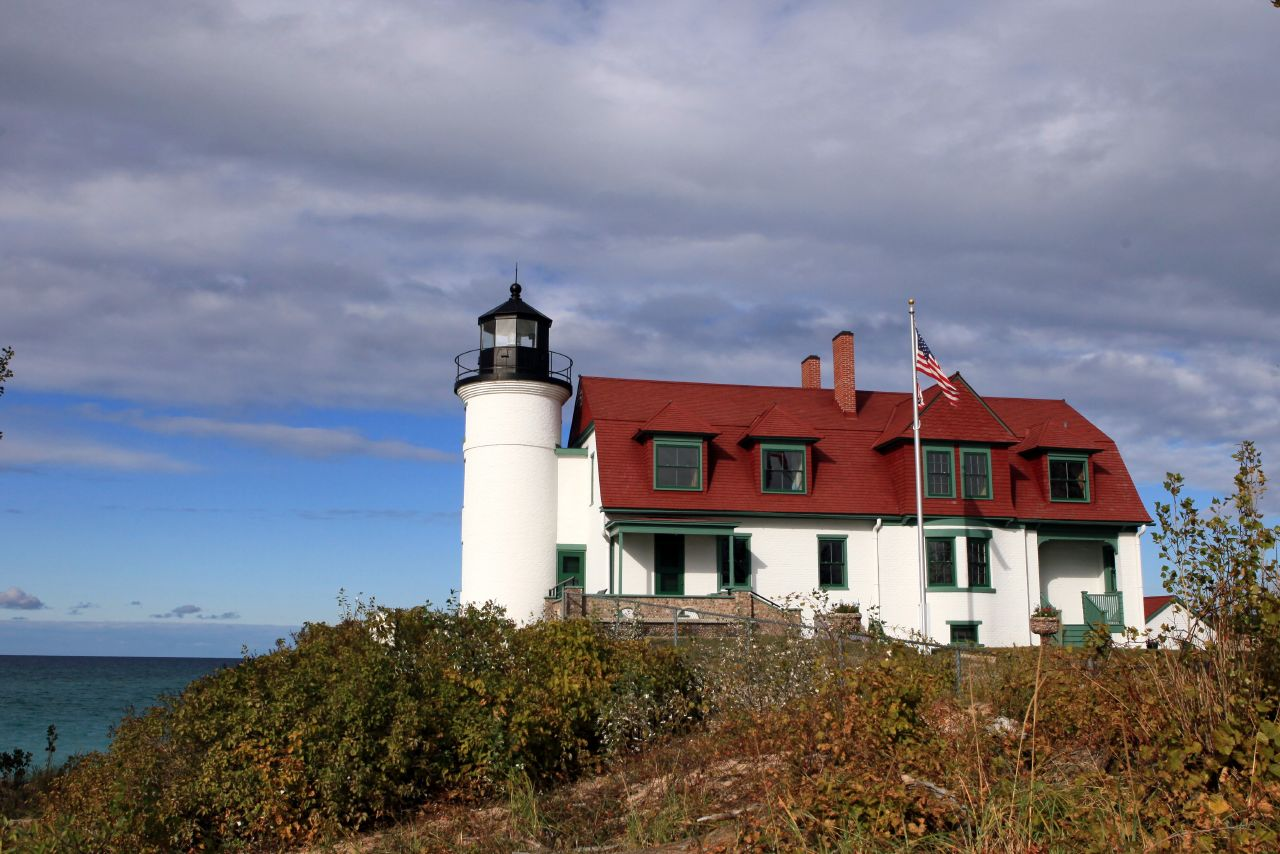
Point Betsie Light

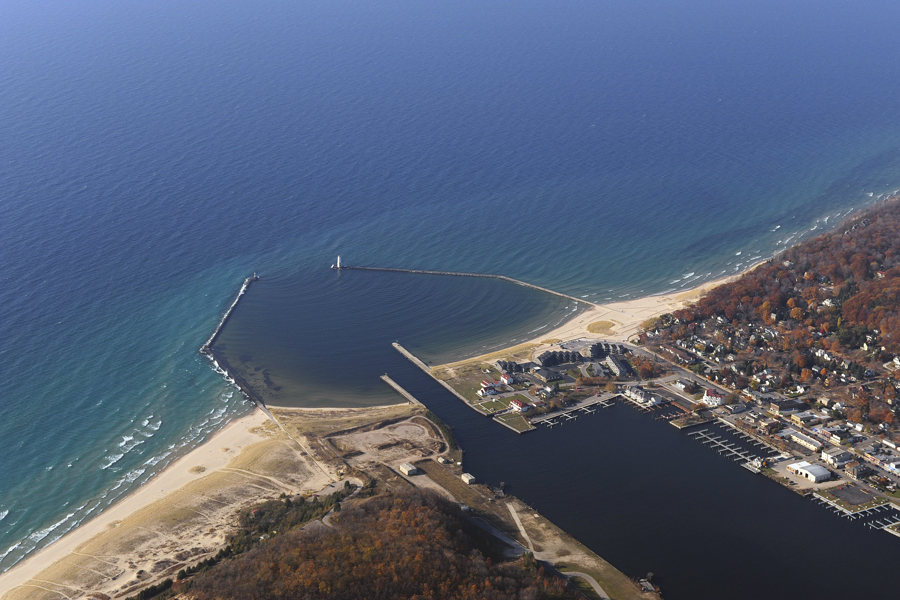
Frankfort Harbor; the mouth of the Betsie River at Lake Michigan

== History ==
Today's Benzie County was originally part of Leelanau County. Leelanau County was separated from Michilimackinac County in 1840, and was attached to Grand Traverse County. In 1863, The northern section of Leelanau County was organized, and the southern section, now named Benzie County, was left attached to Grand Traverse County. Benzie County was organized in its own right in 1869.

=== Etymology ===
The name "Benzie" is derived from the French la rivière aux Bec-scies, "the river of sawbills", bec-scie ("bill-saw") being a type of ducks. Americans altered the pronunciation of the river's name, which became known as the "Betsie River". A similar alteration in pronunciation produced "Benzie".

== Geography ==
According to the U.S. Census Bureau, the county has a total area of 860 square miles (2,200 km^{2}), of which 320 square miles (830 km^{2}) is land and 540 square miles (1,400 km^{2}) (63%) is water. It is the smallest county in Michigan by land area.

Benzie County is located in the northwest of the Lower Peninsula, in the "little finger" position of the mitten-shaped peninsula and is considered to be part of the Northern Michigan region. Lake Michigan is to the west, Leelanau County and the Leelanau Peninsula are to the north. Grand Traverse County and Traverse City are to the east. Wexford County is to the southeast and Manistee County to the south. The Sleeping Bear Dunes National Lakeshore extends into the northwest portion of the county. Crystal Lake is a prominent physical feature of the area. The Platte River rises out of a lake district around Lake Ann in the northeast of the county and flows southwest and the northwest into Big Platte Lake before emptying into Lake Michigan at Platte River Point. The Betsie River rises in neighboring Grand Traverse County, flowing southwest across the southeast corner of the county into Manistee County, where it bends northwest until just south of Benzonia where it receives the outflow of Crystal Lake and then flows mostly west through Elberta and Frankfort and into Lake Michigan.

Portions of the Pere Marquette State Forest lie within the county and offer several trails including a 10-mile (16 km) route along the Betsie River and a 5.8-mile (9.3 km) trail near Lake Ann. There are state forest campgrounds at Platte River and Lake Ann. The Betsie River State Game Area is located just east of Elberta. 50 miles (80 km) of the Betsie River is a state-designated Natural River from Grass Lake, just west of the Grand Traverse County line, to its inlet into Lake Betsie just east of Elberta. The natural and scenic richness of the area has made it a host to a variety of conservation, education, and recreation programs, including Crystalaire, the Grand Traverse Regional Land Conservancy, and others.

=== Major highways ===
- US 31 enters the county from the south, passes through Benzonia and Beulah on the south end of Crystal Lake before turning to exit the county to the east.
- M-22 traverses the western edge of the county, providing a scenic drive along the shore of Lake Michigan.
- M-115 enters the county from the south, angling northwest, and merges with US 31 for a couple of miles until Benzonia where M-115 continues west to end in Frankfort.

Previously, an additional highway, M-168, ran in the village of Elberta, serving the former Ann Arbor Railroad ferry docks. The route was handed back to local control in 2012.

=== Adjacent counties ===
By land

- Leelanau County - north
- Grand Traverse County - east
- Manistee County - south
- Wexford County - adjacent at the southeast corner

By water

- Door County, Wisconsin - northwest across Lake Michigan
- Kewaunee County, Wisconsin - southwest across Lake Michigan

== Communities ==
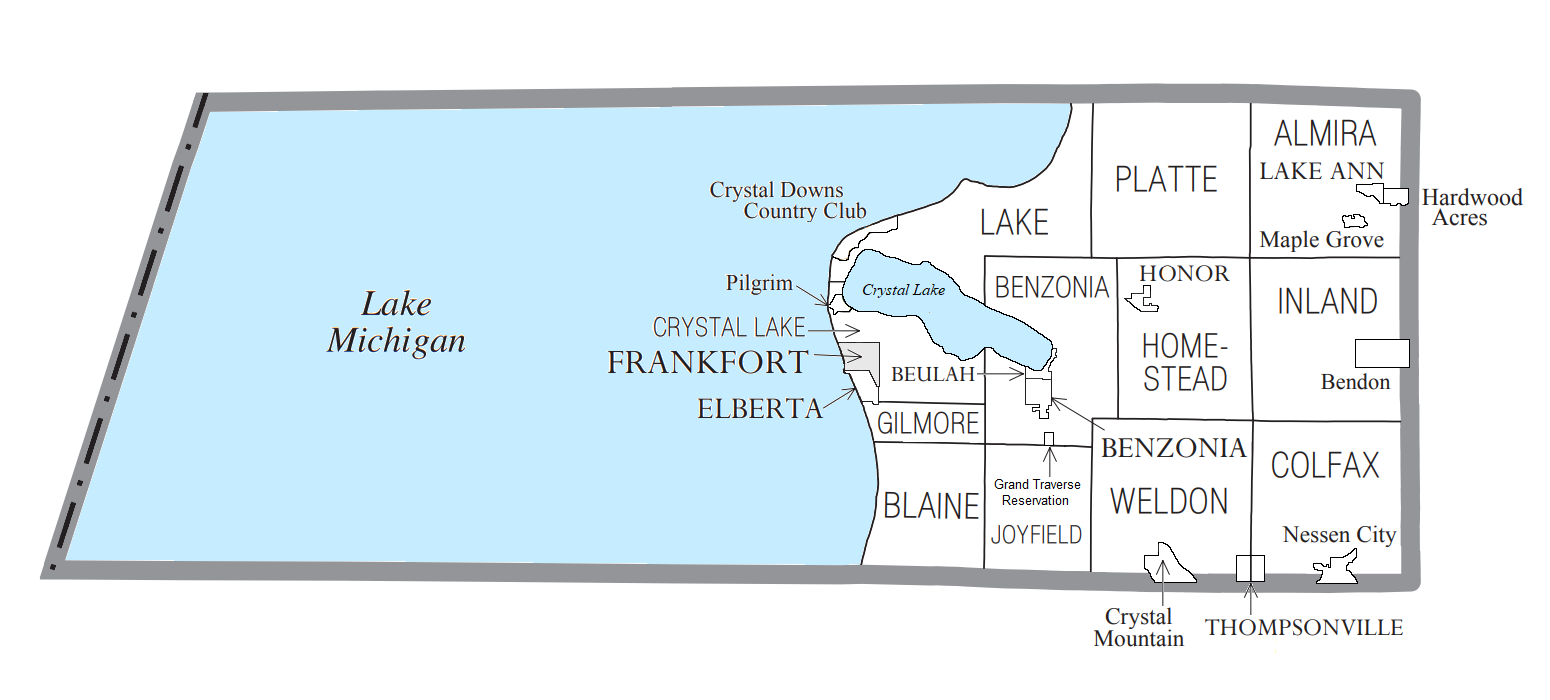
U.S. Census data map showing local municipal boundaries within Benzie County, as well as CDP boundaries. Shaded areas represent incorporated cities.

=== City ===
- Frankfort

=== Villages ===
- Benzonia
- Beulah (county seat)
- Elberta
- Honor
- Lake Ann
- Thompsonville

=== Civil townships ===
- Almira Township
- Benzonia Township
- Blaine Township
- Colfax Township
- Crystal Lake Township
- Gilmore Township
- Homestead Township
- Inland Township
- Joyfield Township
- Lake Township
- Platte Township
- Weldon Township

=== Census-designated places ===
- Bendon
- Crystal Downs Country Club
- Crystal Mountain
- Hardwood Acres
- Maple Grove
- Nessen City
- Pilgrim

=== Other unincorporated communities ===
- Aral
- Averytown
- Cedar Run
- Chimney Corners Resort
- Crystallia
- Edgewater
- Oberlin
- Platte River
- Wallin
- Weldon
- Watervale

=== Indian reservation ===
- The Grand Traverse Indian Reservation, which has territory in five counties, occupies a small area in southern Benzonia Township.

== Demographics ==
Historical population
Census	Pop.	Note	%±
1870	2,184		—
1880	3,433		57.2%
1890	5,237		52.5%
1900	9,685		84.9%
1910	10,638		9.8%
1920	6,947		−34.7%
1930	6,587		−5.2%
1940	7,800		18.4%
1950	8,306		6.5%
1960	7,834		−5.7%
1970	8,593		9.7%
1980	11,205		30.4%
1990	12,200		8.9%
2000	15,998		31.1%
2010	17,525		9.5%
2020	17,970		2.5%
2025 (est.)	18,568	▲	3.3%
U.S. Decennial Census; 1790-1960 1900-1990; 1990-2000 2010-2018

=== Racial and ethnic composition ===
Benzie County, Michigan – Racial and ethnic composition Note: the US Census treats Hispanic/Latino as an ethnic category. This table excludes Latinos from the racial categories and assigns them to a separate category. Hispanics/Latinos may be of any race.
Race / Ethnicity (NH = Non-Hispanic)	Pop 1980	Pop 1990	Pop 2000	Pop 2010	Pop 2020	% 1980	% 1990	% 2000	% 2010	% 2020
White alone (NH)	10,894	11,770	15,270	16,658	16,597	97.22%	96.48%	95.45%	95.05%	92.36%
Black or African American alone (NH)	36	30	43	71	56	0.32%	0.25%	0.27%	0.41%	0.31%
Native American or Alaska Native alone (NH)	143	236	248	244	164	1.28%	1.93%	1.55%	1.39%	0.91%
Asian alone (NH)	13	35	25	44	71	0.12%	0.29%	0.16%	0.25%	0.40%
Native Hawaiian or Pacific Islander alone (NH)	x	x	0	0	0	x	x	0.00%	0.00%	0.00%
Other race alone (NH)	14	0	11	3	65	0.12%	0.00%	0.07%	0.02%	0.36%
Mixed race or Multiracial (NH)	x	x	168	203	626	x	x	1.05%	1.16%	3.48%
Hispanic or Latino (any race)	105	129	233	302	391	0.94%	1.06%	1.46%	1.72%	2.18%
Total	11,205	12,200	15,998	17,525	17,970	100.00%	100.00%	100.00%	100.00%	100.00%

=== 2020 census ===
As of the 2020 census, the county had a population of 17,970 and a median age of 50.6 years. 17.4% of residents were under the age of 18 and 27.2% were 65 years of age or older. For every 100 females there were 100.2 males, and for every 100 females age 18 and over there were 98.3 males age 18 and over.

The racial makeup of the county was 93.1% White, 0.4% Black or African American, 1.0% American Indian and Alaska Native, 0.4% Asian, <0.1% Native Hawaiian and Pacific Islander, 0.7% from some other race, and 4.5% from two or more races. Hispanic or Latino residents of any race comprised 2.2% of the population.

14.5% of residents lived in urban areas, while 85.5% lived in rural areas.

There were 7,753 households in the county, of which 22.0% had children under the age of 18 living in them. Of all households, 52.9% were married-couple households, 18.3% were households with a male householder and no spouse or partner present, and 21.9% were households with a female householder and no spouse or partner present. About 28.3% of all households were made up of individuals and 14.4% had someone living alone who was 65 years of age or older.

There were 12,099 housing units, of which 35.9% were vacant. Among occupied housing units, 86.7% were owner-occupied and 13.3% were renter-occupied. The homeowner vacancy rate was 1.3% and the rental vacancy rate was 22.3%.

=== 2000 census ===
As of the 2000 census, there were 15,998 people, 6,500 households, and 4,595 families residing in the county.

In 2000, the median income for a household in the county was $37,350, and the median income for a family was $42,716. Males had a median income of $30,218 versus $21,730 for females. The per capita income for the county was $18,524. About 4.7% of families and 7.0% of the population were below the poverty line, including 8.2% of those under age 18 and 5.2% of those age 65 or over.

== Government ==
For most of its history, Benzie County has primarily supported Republican presidential candidates, with the only times they failed to carry to the county prior to 1992 being in 1912 & 1964. Starting with the 1992 election, the county has become a Republican-leaning bellwether county, with 2012 and 2020 being the only two presidential elections it did not vote for the national winner from 1980 on as of 2024.

United States presidential election results for Benzie County, Michigan
Year	Republican		Democratic		Third party(ies)	
Year	No.	%	No.	%	No.	%
1884	556	54.89%	380	37.51%	77	7.60%
1888	710	57.58%	412	33.41%	111	9.00%
1892	774	52.47%	498	33.76%	203	13.76%
1896	1,366	60.39%	803	35.50%	93	4.11%
1900	1,472	66.28%	626	28.19%	123	5.54%
1904	1,582	74.06%	295	13.81%	259	12.13%
1908	1,437	62.97%	551	24.15%	294	12.88%
1912	568	29.69%	326	17.04%	1,019	53.27%
1916	900	47.19%	770	40.38%	237	12.43%
1920	1,520	72.00%	422	19.99%	169	8.01%
1924	1,922	73.84%	198	7.61%	483	18.56%
1928	1,849	84.28%	321	14.63%	24	1.09%
1932	1,595	50.22%	1,432	45.09%	149	4.69%
1936	1,742	47.62%	1,686	46.09%	230	6.29%
1940	2,320	61.62%	1,429	37.95%	16	0.42%
1944	2,026	64.48%	1,084	34.50%	32	1.02%
1948	2,013	65.17%	964	31.21%	112	3.63%
1952	2,752	73.04%	980	26.01%	36	0.96%
1956	2,620	71.18%	1,046	28.42%	15	0.41%
1960	2,484	65.45%	1,306	34.41%	5	0.13%
1964	1,674	45.71%	1,983	54.15%	5	0.14%
1968	2,138	60.91%	1,147	32.68%	225	6.41%
1972	2,686	66.26%	1,310	32.31%	58	1.43%
1976	3,085	61.23%	1,891	37.53%	62	1.23%
1980	3,054	55.55%	1,842	33.50%	602	10.95%
1984	3,590	65.25%	1,866	33.91%	46	0.84%
1988	3,240	56.52%	2,437	42.52%	55	0.96%
1992	2,438	35.58%	2,715	39.62%	1,699	24.80%
1996	2,856	42.09%	3,081	45.41%	848	12.50%
2000	4,172	51.68%	3,546	43.93%	354	4.39%
2004	5,284	54.04%	4,383	44.83%	111	1.14%
2008	4,687	45.47%	5,451	52.88%	171	1.66%
2012	5,075	51.26%	4,685	47.32%	141	1.42%
2016	5,539	54.16%	4,108	40.16%	581	5.68%
2020	6,601	53.83%	5,480	44.69%	181	1.48%
2024	6,895	53.67%	5,780	44.99%	171	1.33%

United States Senate election results for County, Michigan1
Year	Republican		Democratic		Third party(ies)	
Year	No.	%	No.	%	No.	%
2024	6,742	52.92%	5,659	44.42%	338	2.65%

Michigan Gubernatorial election results for Benzie County
Year	Republican		Democratic		Third party(ies)	
Year	No.	%	No.	%	No.	%
2022	5,064	47.38%	5,446	50.95%	179	1.67%

The county government operates the jail, maintains rural roads, operates the major local courts, keeps files of deeds and mortgages, maintains vital records, administers public health regulations, and participates with the state in the provision of welfare and other social services. The county board of commissioners controls the budget but has only limited authority to make laws or ordinances. In Michigan, most local government functions — police and fire, building and zoning, tax assessment, street maintenance, etc. — are the responsibility of individual cities and townships.

=== Elected officials ===
- Prosecuting Attorney: Sara Swanson
- Sheriff: Kyle Rosa
- County Clerk: Tammy Bowers
- County Treasurer: Kelly Long
- Register of Deeds: Paula Eberhart
- Drain Commissioner: Edward Hoogterp
- County Surveyor: John Smendzuik

(information as of September 2005)

== Education ==
The Northwest Educational Services, based in Traverse City, services the students in the county along with those of Antrim, Grand Traverse, Kalkaska, and Leelanau. The intermediate school district offers regional special education services, early education and English learner programs, and technical career pathways for students of its districts.

Benzie County is served by the following regular public school districts:

- Benzie County Central Schools, which serves most of the county, including Benzonia, Beulah, Honor, Lake Ann, and Thompsonville
- Frankfort-Elberta Area Schools, which serves the west of the county, including Frankfort and Elberta
- Glen Lake Community Schools, which serves a small portion of Platte Township
- Traverse City Area Public Schools, which serves a small portion of Almira Township

Benzie County has one private school, the New Covenant Christian Academy (Christian).

== See also ==
- List of Michigan State Historic Sites in Benzie County, Michigan
- National Register of Historic Places listings in Benzie County, Michigan
- USS Benzie County (LST-266)
- Benzie Central Schools
- Benzie Central High School
