= Platte Township, Michigan =

- Civil township
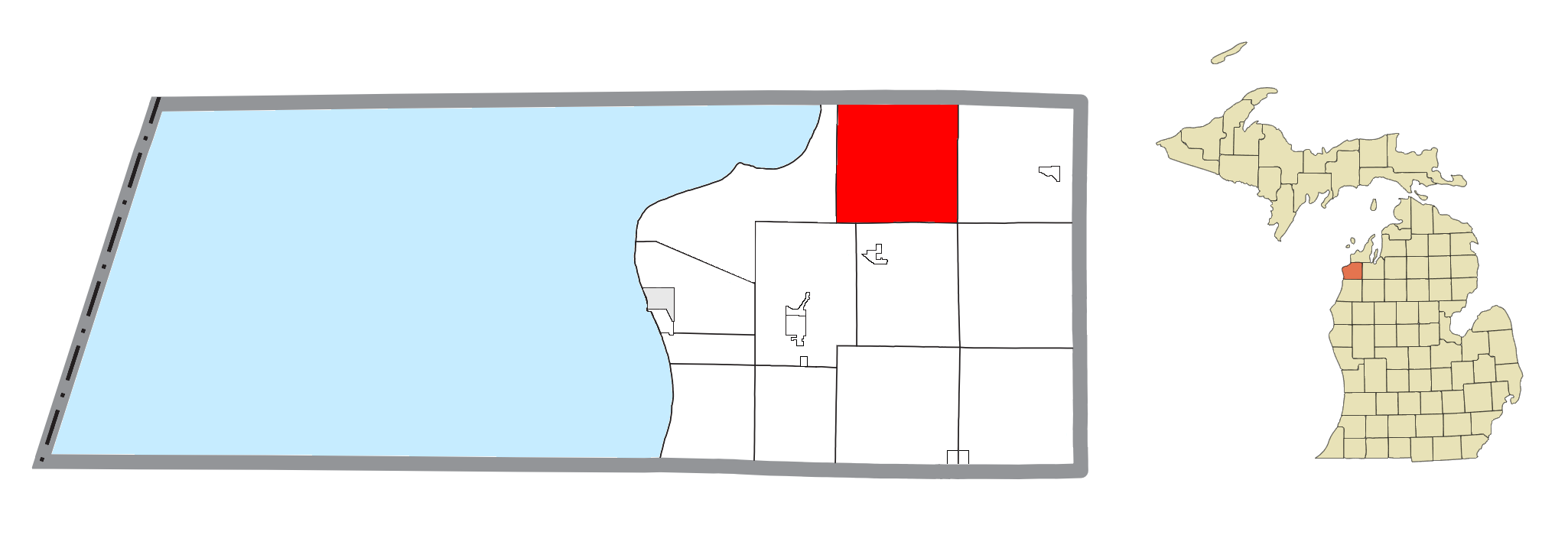
- Location within Benzie County

- Location within the state of Michigan Platte Township (the United States)
- Coordinates: 44°43′54″N 86°00′11″W
- Country: United States
- State: Michigan
- County: Benzie
- Organized: 1867

Government
  - Supervisor: Paul Solem

Area
  - Total: 36.5 sq mi (94.5 km^{2})
  - Land: 36.3 sq mi (94.0 km^{2})
  - Water: 0.19 sq mi (0.5 km^{2})
- Elevation: 738 ft (225 m)

Population (2020)
  - Total: 343
  - Density: 9.8/sq mi (3.8/km^{2})
- Time zone: UTC-5 (Eastern (EST))
  - Summer (DST): UTC-4 (EDT)
- ZIP code(s): 49630, 49640, 49650
- Area code: 231
- FIPS code: 26-64760
- GNIS feature ID: 1626914
- Website: Official website

Platte Township (/plæt/) is a rural civil township of Benzie County in the U.S. state of Michigan. Its population was 343 at the 2020 census. It is located in the north central portion of the county.

== Communities ==
- Osborn is a former settlement located with the township. A post office operated here from April 23, 1887 until February 15, 1911. It had a railway station along the Empire & South Eastern Railroad.

== Geography ==
According to the United States Census Bureau, Platte Township has a total area of 36.5 square miles (94.5 km^{2}), of which 36.3 square miles (94.0 km^{2}) is land and 0.19 square miles (0.5 km^{2}), or 0.50%, is water.

=== Major highway ===
- M-22 runs north–south through the west of the township. However, it exits the township to the west. For its entire length, M-22 parallels the coast of Lake Michigan.

== Demographics ==
As of the census of 2000, there were 342 people, 151 households, and 109 families residing in the township. The population density was 9.4 per square mile (3.6/km^{2}). There were 242 housing units at an average density of 6.7 per square mile (2.6/km^{2}). The racial makeup of the township was 97.08% White, 1.17% Native American, 0.29% from other races, and 1.46% from two or more races. Hispanic or Latino of any race were 1.17% of the population.

There were 151 households, out of which 23.8% had children under the age of 18 living with them, 60.9% were married couples living together, 6.0% had a female householder with no husband present, and 27.8% were non-families. 24.5% of all households were made up of individuals, and 7.3% had someone living alone who was 65 years of age or older. The average household size was 2.26 and the average family size was 2.66.

In the township the population was spread out, with 20.5% under the age of 18, 3.8% from 18 to 24, 27.5% from 25 to 44, 34.2% from 45 to 64, and 14.0% who were 65 years of age or older. The median age was 44 years. For every 100 females, there were 111.1 males. For every 100 females age 18 and over, there were 119.4 males.

The median income for a household in the township was $36,979, and the median income for a family was $38,250. Males had a median income of $23,333 versus $18,333 for females. The per capita income for the township was $18,499. About 5.5% of families and 6.1% of the population were below the poverty line, including 10.7% of those under age 18 and none of those age 65 or over.
