= Colfax Township, Benzie County, Michigan =

Colfax Township, Michigan
- Civil township
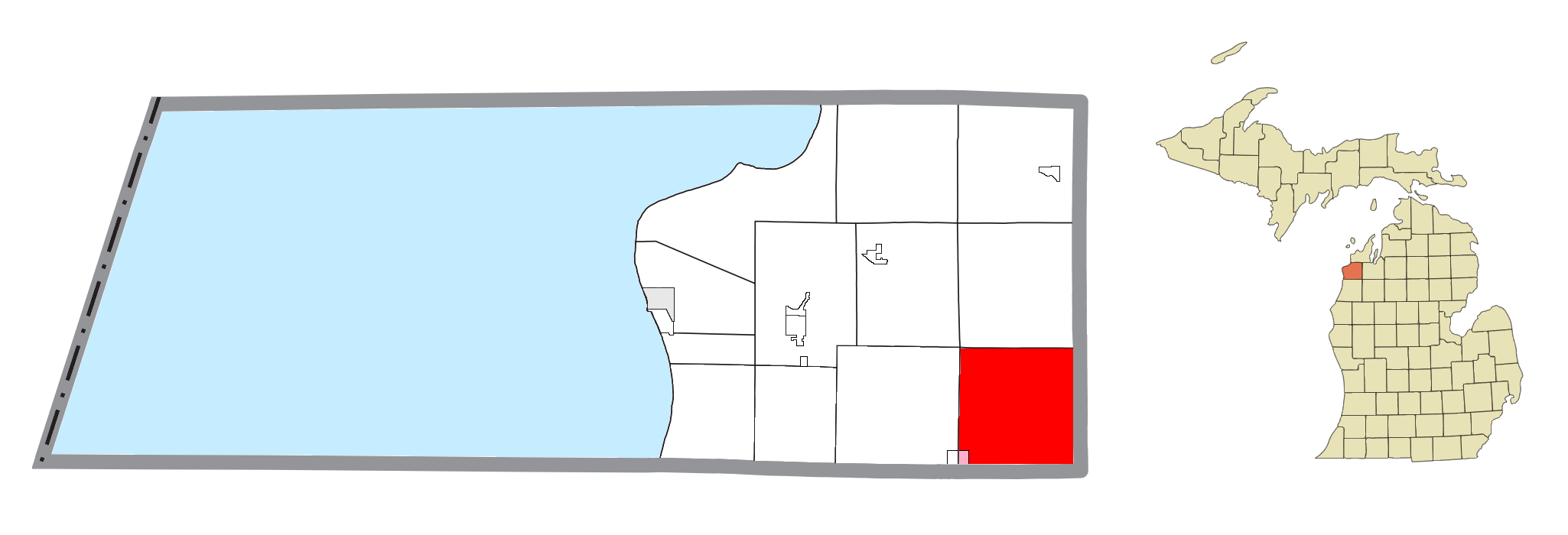
- Location within Benzie County (red) and an administered portion of the Thompsonville village (pink)

- Location within the state of Michigan Colfax Township (the United States)
- Coordinates: 44°33′21″N 85°52′34″W
- Country: United States
- State: Michigan
- County: Benzie

Government
  - Supervisor: Ron Evitts

Area
  - Total: 35.9 sq mi (93.0 km^{2})
  - Land: 35.6 sq mi (92.3 km^{2})
  - Water: 0.27 sq mi (0.7 km^{2})
- Elevation: 827 ft (252 m)

Population (2020)
  - Total: 504
  - Density: 18/sq mi (7.1/km^{2})
- Time zone: UTC-5 (Eastern (EST))
  - Summer (DST): UTC-4 (EDT)
- ZIP code(s): 49643, 49683
- Area code: 231
- FIPS code: 26-17120
- GNIS feature ID: 1626111
- Website: Official website

Colfax Township is a civil township of Benzie County in the U.S. state of Michigan. The population was 504 at the 2020 census. Colfax Township contains half of the village of Thompsonville, and the entire community of Nessen City

== Geography ==
According to the United States Census Bureau, the township has a total area of 35.9 square miles (93.0 km^{2}), of which 35.6 square miles (92.3 km^{2}) is land and 0.27 square miles (0.7 km^{2}), or 0.72%, is water. Colfax Township forms the southeastern corner of Benzie County, forming a quadripoint with neighboring Grand Traverse, Manistee, and Wexford counties.

The Betsie River flows through the township, east to west, toward Lake Michigan.

There are no state trunkline highways within Colfax Township.

=== Communities ===
- Nessen City is a census-designated place in the south of the township.
- Thompsonville is a village located in the southwestern corner of the township, shared with Weldon Township to the east.
- Wallin is an unincorporated community in the north of the township, located at 44°34′15″N 85°53′20″W. The community was founded in 1893 as a station on the Chicago and West Michigan Railway, near where the railway crossed the Betsie River.

== Demographics ==
As of the census of 2000, there were 585 people, 224 households, and 170 families residing in the township. The population density was 16.4 inhabitants per square mile (6.3/km^{2}). There were 297 housing units at an average density of 8.3 per square mile (3.2/km^{2}). The racial makeup of the township was 95.73% White, 0.17% African American, 1.54% Native American, 0.17% Asian, 0.68% from other races, and 1.71% from two or more races. Hispanic or Latino of any race were 2.05% of the population.

There were 224 households, out of which 36.2% had children under the age of 18 living with them, 61.6% were married couples living together, 7.6% had a female householder with no husband present, and 24.1% were non-families. 20.5% of all households were made up of individuals, and 6.7% had someone living alone who was 65 years of age or older. The average household size was 2.61 and the average family size was 3.02.

In the township the population was spread out, with 28.2% under the age of 18, 5.1% from 18 to 24, 33.8% from 25 to 44, 22.7% from 45 to 64, and 10.1% who were 65 years of age or older. The median age was 36 years. For every 100 females, there were 112.7 males. For every 100 females age 18 and over, there were 114.3 males.

The median income for a household in the township was $37,250, and the median income for a family was $38,482. Males had a median income of $27,083 versus $21,477 for females. The per capita income for the township was $14,812. About 6.4% of families and 6.9% of the population were below the poverty line, including 8.7% of those under age 18 and 4.9% of those age 65 or over.
