= Joyfield Township, Michigan =

- Civil township
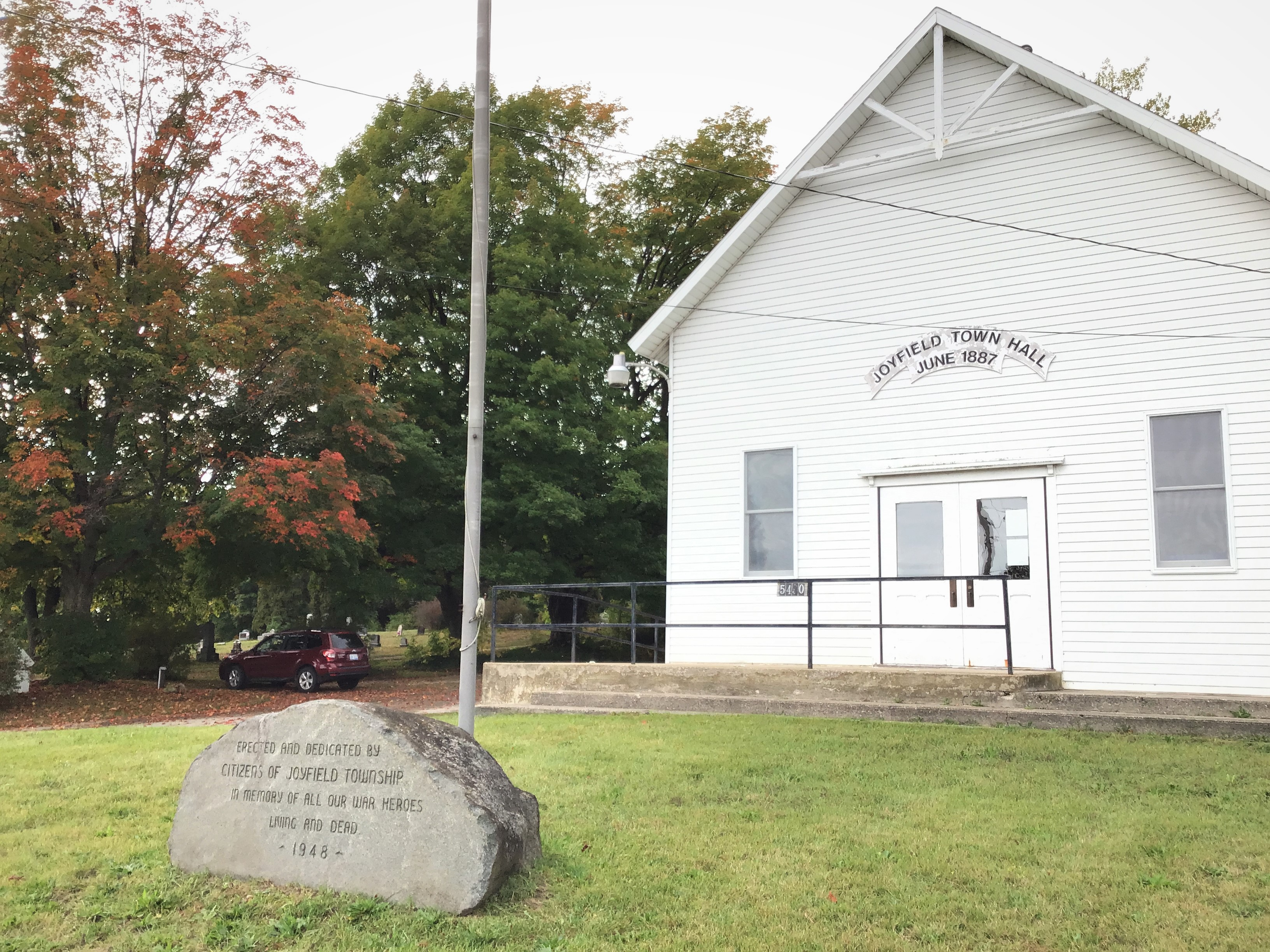
- Town hall

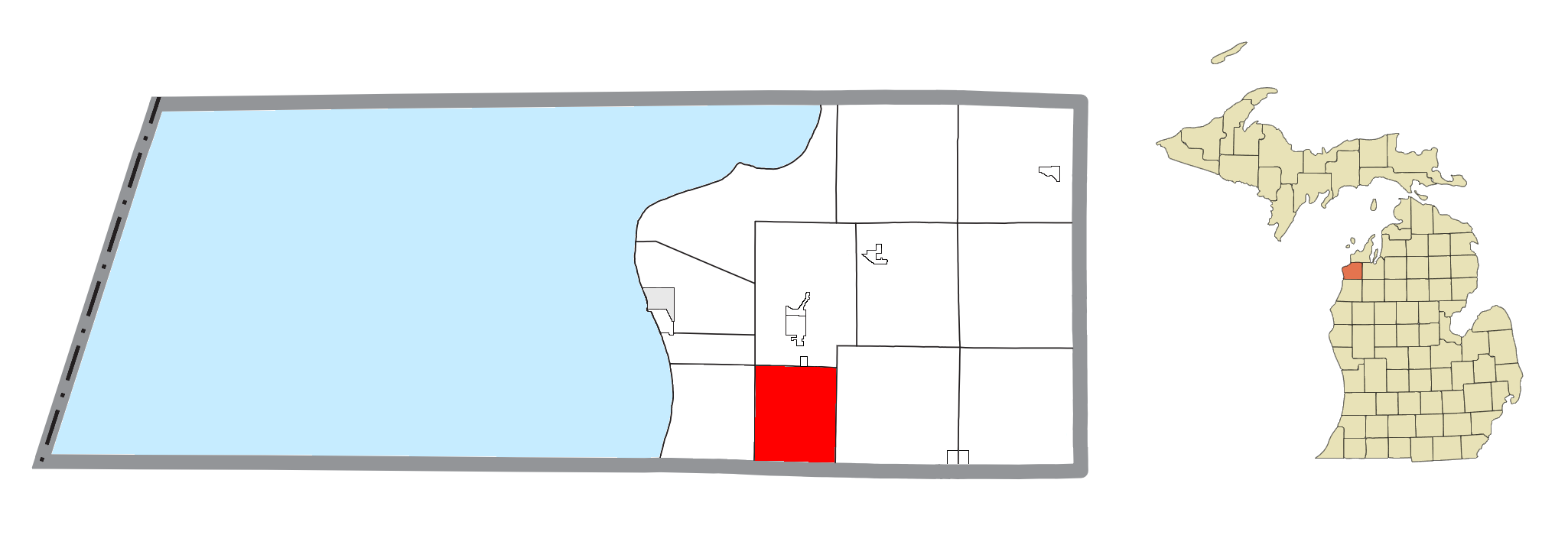
- Location within Benzie County

- Location within the state of Michigan Joyfield Township (the United States)
- Coordinates: 44°33′58″N 86°05′25″W
- Country: United States
- State: Michigan
- County: Benzie

Area
  - Total: 20.0 sq mi (51.7 km^{2})
  - Land: 19.9 sq mi (51.6 km^{2})
  - Water: 0.077 sq mi (0.2 km^{2})
- Elevation: 843 ft (257 m)

Population (2020)
  - Total: 763
  - Density: 40/sq mi (15.5/km^{2})
- Time zone: UTC-5 (Eastern (EST))
  - Summer (DST): UTC-4 (EDT)
- ZIP code(s): 49616, 49635
- Area code: 231
- FIPS code: 26-42000
- GNIS feature ID: 1626545
- Website: https://joyfieldtownshipmi.gov/

Joyfield Township is a civil township of Benzie County in the U.S. state of Michigan. The population was 763 at the 2020 census. The township is located in the south central portion of the county. US 31 and M-115 converge at the northern edge of the township.

== Geography ==
According to the United States Census Bureau, the township has a total area of 20.0 square miles (51.7 km^{2}), of which 19.9 square miles (51.6 km^{2}) is land and 0.077 square miles (0.2 km^{2}), or 0.30%, is water.

=== Communities ===
- Weldon is an unincorporated community located in the northeast of Joyfield Township, at 44°33′58″N 86°3′47″W. The community was founded in 1863 by Arthur T. Case, who later was elected to the Michigan Legislature. Weldon was organized in 1868, and given a post office in 1879, lasting until 1903. The community is named after the adjacent township.

=== Major highways ===
- US 31 follows a north–south path through the township.
- M-115 largely follows a diagonal northwest–southeast path, through the northeast of the township. In the extreme north of the township, M-115 meets US 31, and the two highways continue concurrently north toward Benzonia.

== Demographics ==
As of the census of 2000, there were 777 people, 286 households, and 217 families residing in the township. The population density was 38.8 inhabitants per square mile (15.0/km^{2}). There were 338 housing units at an average density of 16.9 per square mile (6.5/km^{2}). The racial makeup of the township was 94.08% White, 1.67% African American, 1.54% Native American, 0.13% Asian, 0.64% from other races, and 1.93% from two or more races. Hispanic or Latino of any race were 3.35% of the population.

There were 286 households, out of which 32.9% had children under the age of 18 living with them, 64.3% were married couples living together, 5.6% had a female householder with no husband present, and 23.8% were non-families. 19.2% of all households were made up of individuals, and 7.3% had someone living alone who was 65 years of age or older. The average household size was 2.64 and the average family size was 2.96.

In the township the population was spread out, with 27.8% under the age of 18, 6.8% from 18 to 24, 27.5% from 25 to 44, 24.1% from 45 to 64, and 13.8% who were 65 years of age or older. The median age was 39 years. For every 100 females, there were 101.3 males. For every 100 females age 18 and over, there were 102.5 males.

The median income for a household in the township was $36,029, and the median income for a family was $38,472. Males had a median income of $26,477 versus $21,250 for females. The per capita income for the township was $14,692. About 5.8% of families and 9.5% of the population were below the poverty line, including 11.7% of those under age 18 and 5.2% of those age 65 or over.
