= Motiograph =

Film equipment company

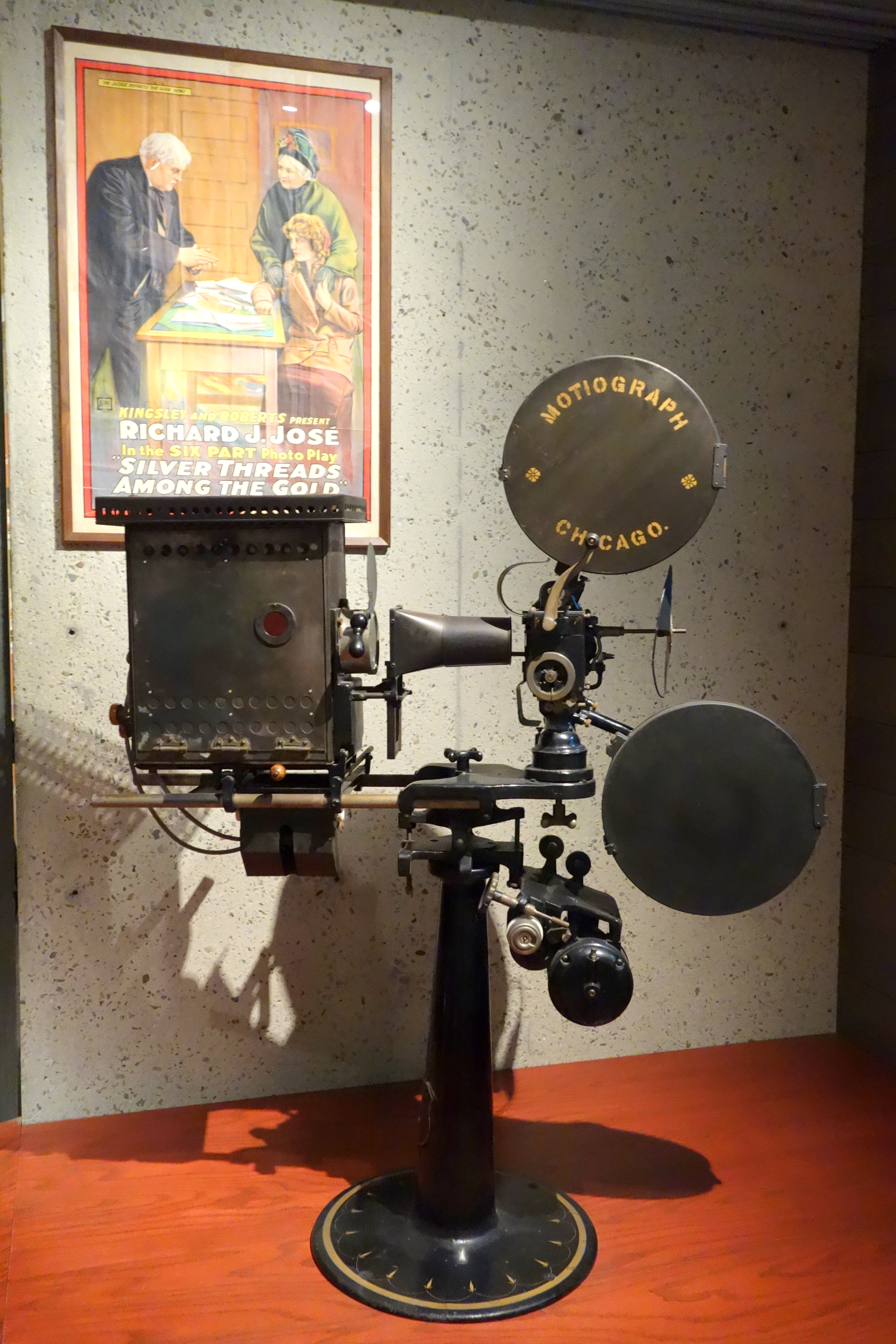
Motiograph projector, c. 1911

Motiograph (originally The Enterprise Optical Manufacturing Company) was a film equipment company established by Alvah C Roebuck in Chicago in 1896. The company manufactured theater projectors and speakers. Their Optiograph 35 mm film projector was first introduced in 1898 and sold via catalogs including Sears. This was a smaller projector suitable for homes and schools. Beginning in 1908, all products released by the Enterprise Optical Manufacturing Company carry the brand name Motiograph. In 1911, their first theater grade 35 mm projector (Motiograph model D) was released. Roebuck sold the company in 1924 to a group of investors led by O.F. Spahr and Fred Matthews who would become the new President and Secretary, respectively. The Matthews family would retain ownership from then on. In 1936, they changed the company name from the Enterprise Optical Manufacturing Company to become Motiograph, Inc. Also in 1936, Motiograph released the very popular model K projector and continues to innovate after the war years. The date of the company's closure is unverified, but by 1969 it had failed to renew any copyrights for its products. The last corporate listing for Motiograph in Illinois is from 1973.

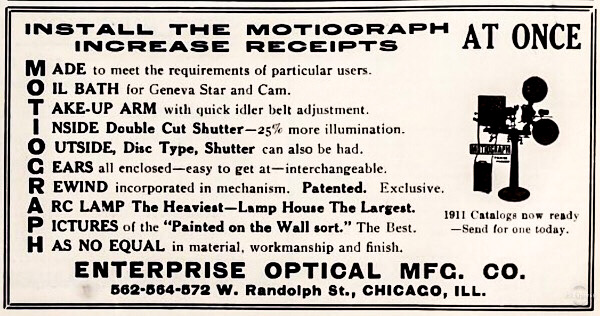
Motiograph advertisement in the trade publication The Film Index, May 1911
