= Honor, Michigan =

- Village
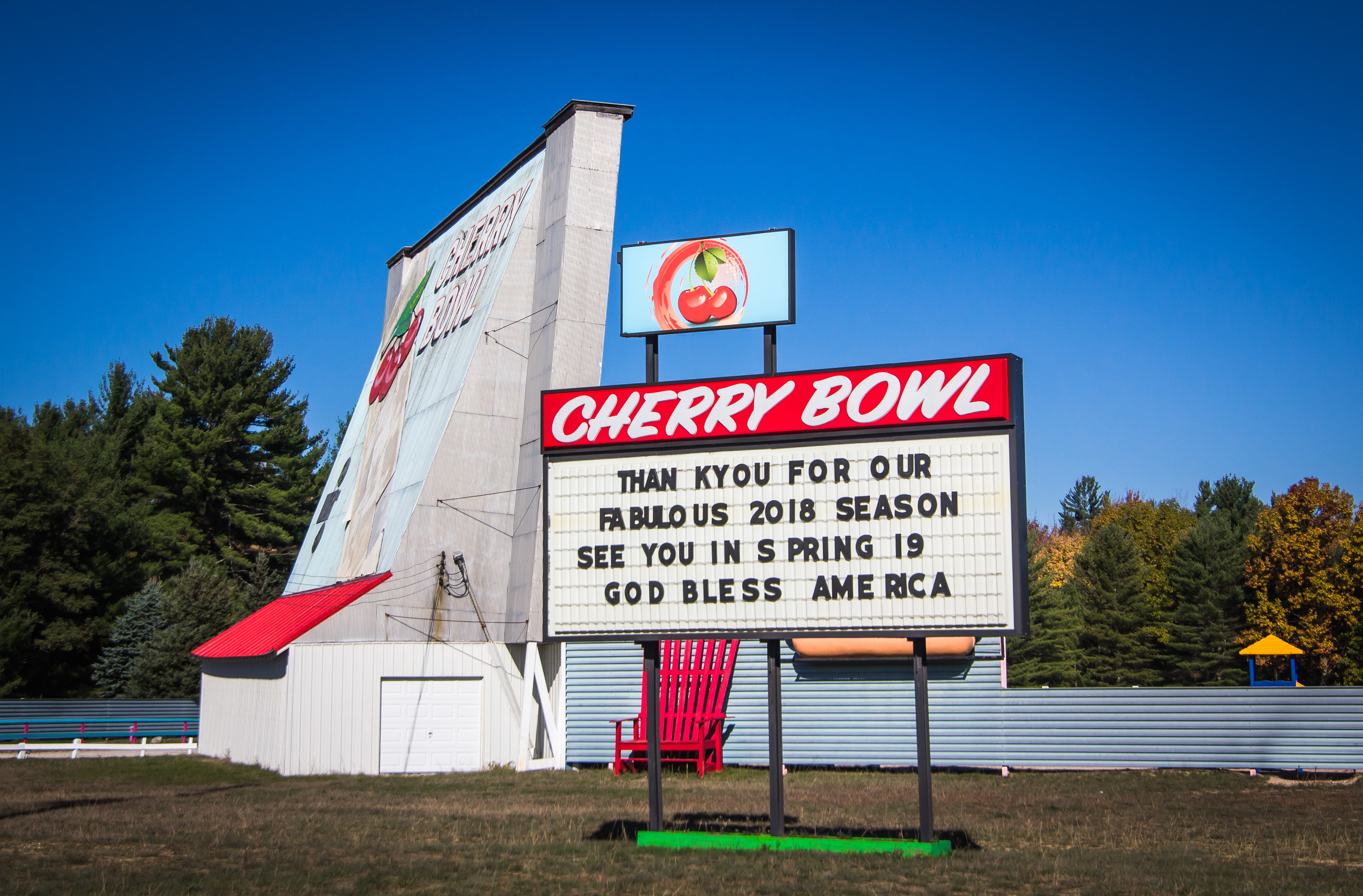
- The Cherry Bowl located in Honor

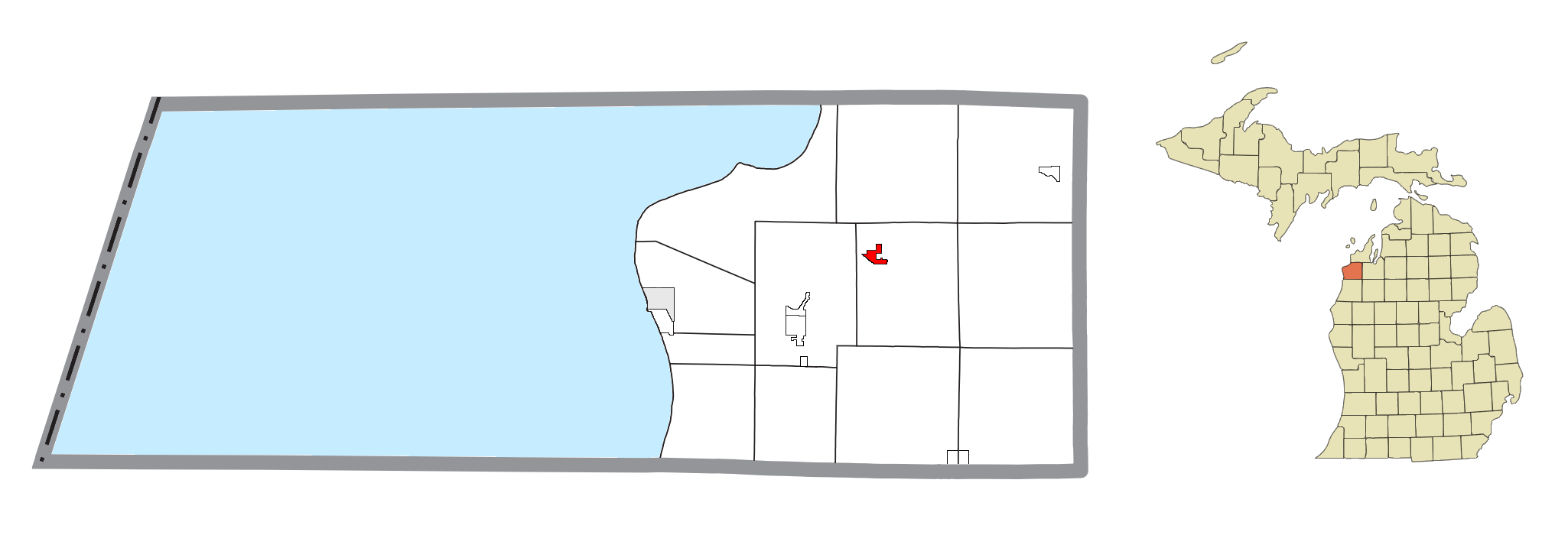
- Location within Benzie County

- Location within the state of Michigan
- Coordinates: 44°39′56″N 86°01′20″W
- Country: United States
- State: Michigan
- County: Benzie
- Township: Homestead

Area
  - Total: 0.55 sq mi (1.43 km^{2})
  - Land: 0.54 sq mi (1.40 km^{2})
  - Water: 0.015 sq mi (0.04 km^{2})
- Elevation: 643 ft (196 m)

Population (2020)
  - Total: 337
  - Density: 625.0/sq mi (241.31/km^{2})
- Time zone: UTC-5 (Eastern (EST))
  - Summer (DST): UTC-4 (EDT)
- ZIP code(s): 49640
- Area code: 231
- FIPS code: 26-39080
- GNIS feature ID: 0628533
- Website: https://villageofhonor.org/

Honor is a village in Benzie County of the U.S. state of Michigan. The population was 337 at the 2020 census. The village is located within Homestead Township on U.S. Highway 31 along the Platte River.

The community has the name of Honor Griffin, the daughter of a first settler.

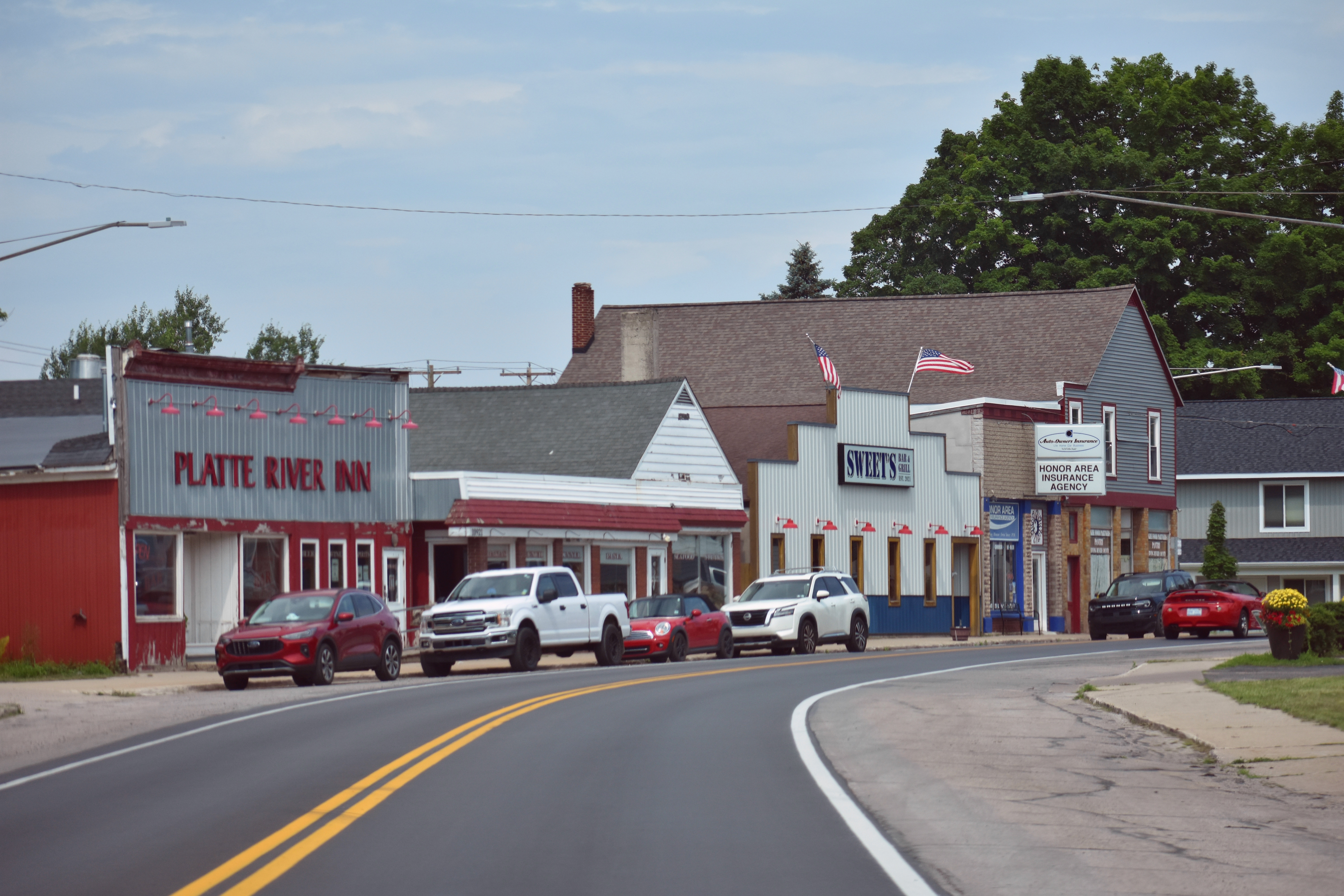
Honor, Michigan in July 2026

== Geography ==
According to the United States Census Bureau, the village has a total area of 0.56 square miles (1.45 km^{2}), of which 0.54 square miles (1.40 km^{2}) is land and 0.02 square miles (0.05 km^{2}) is water.

== Demographics ==
Historical population
Census	Pop.	Note	%±
1920	239		—
1930	254		6.3%
1940	284		11.8%
1950	269		−5.3%
1960	278		3.3%
1970	282		1.4%
1980	281		−0.4%
1990	292		3.9%
2000	299		2.4%
2010	328		9.7%
2020	337		2.7%
U.S. Decennial Census

=== 2010 census ===
As of the census of 2010, there were 328 people, 135 households, and 87 families residing in the village. The population density was 607.4 inhabitants per square mile (234.5/km^{2}). There were 186 housing units at an average density of 344.4 per square mile (133.0/km^{2}). The racial makeup of the village was 93.0% White, 0.3% African American, 2.4% Native American, 0.3% Asian, and 4.0% from two or more races. Hispanic or Latino of any race were 2.4% of the population.

There were 135 households, of which 30.4% had children under the age of 18 living with them, 43.0% were married couples living together, 13.3% had a female householder with no husband present, 8.1% had a male householder with no wife present, and 35.6% were non-families. 30.4% of all households were made up of individuals, and 18.5% had someone living alone who was 65 years of age or older. The average household size was 2.43 and the average family size was 2.99.

The median age in the village was 38 years. 26.5% of residents were under the age of 18; 8.2% were between the ages of 18 and 24; 22.3% were from 25 to 44; 22.6% were from 45 to 64; and 20.4% were 65 years of age or older. The gender makeup of the village was 47.6% male and 52.4% female.

=== 2000 census ===
As of the census of 2000, there were 299 people, 129 households, and 82 families residing in the village. The population density was 543.1 inhabitants per square mile (209.7/km^{2}). There were 153 housing units at an average density of 277.9 per square mile (107.3/km^{2}). The racial makeup of the village was 86.29% White, 6.02% Native American, 0.67% Asian, 3.01% from other races, and 4.01% from two or more races. Hispanic or Latino of any race were 3.34% of the population.

There were 129 households, out of which 27.9% had children under the age of 18 living with them, 45.7% were married couples living together, 10.9% had a female householder with no husband present, and 36.4% were non-families. 29.5% of all households were made up of individuals, and 18.6% had someone living alone who was 65 years of age or older. The average household size was 2.32 and the average family size was 2.80.

In the village, the population was spread out, with 24.4% under the age of 18, 9.0% from 18 to 24, 26.4% from 25 to 44, 22.1% from 45 to 64, and 18.1% who were 65 years of age or older. The median age was 38 years. For every 100 females, there were 100.7 males. For every 100 females age 18 and over, there were 91.5 males.

The median income for a household in the village was $32,917, and the median income for a family was $40,833. Males had a median income of $22,273 versus $18,750 for females. The per capita income for the village was $14,274. About 4.1% of families and 11.9% of the population were below the poverty line, including 14.0% of those under the age of eighteen and 3.9% of those 65 or over.

== Arts and culture ==
Honor hosts the Coho Festival during the month of August in celebration of the area's most important fish, the coho salmon.

Honor also has the only drive-in theater left in central Michigan; the Cherry Bowl Diner is located in Honor on U.S. 31.
