= Alonzo Barnard =

American Presbyterian missionary

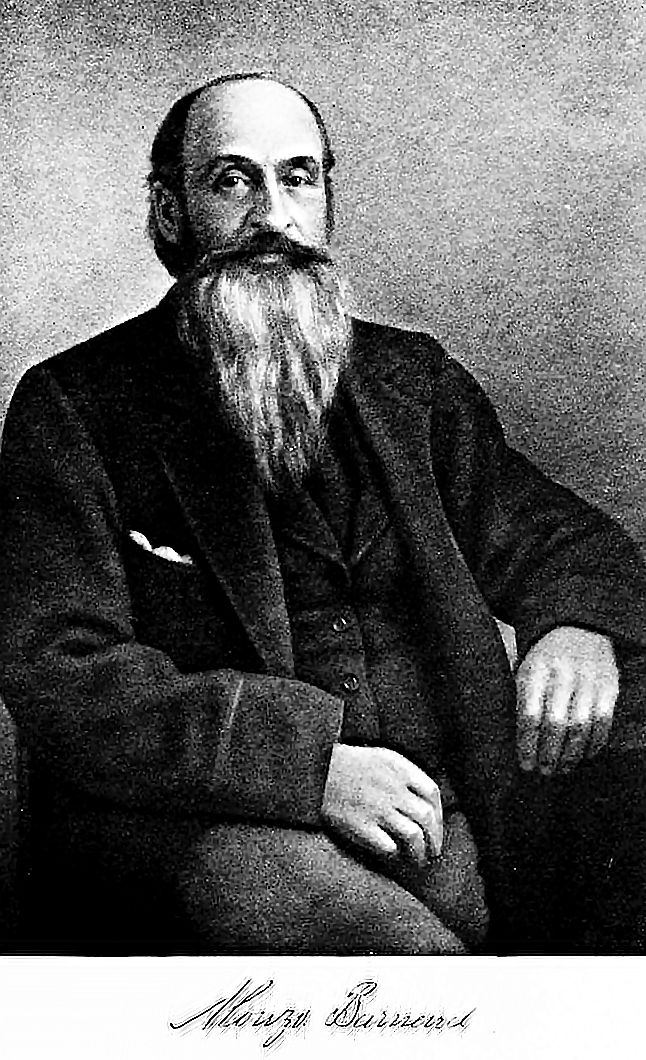
- Born: June 2, 1817; Peru, Vermont
- Died: April 7, 1905 (aged 87); Pomona, Cleon Township, Manistee County, Michigan
- Education: Oberlin College (1843)
- Occupations: Missionary, minister, teacher

Alonzo Barnard (1817–1905) was a Presbyterian missionary to Native Americans. He helped people escape slavery and taught formerly enslaved people in Ontario, Canada. He met his wife Sarah Philena Babcock Barnard (1819–1853) at Oberlin College and they worked together as missionaries and abolitionists with other graduates from Oberlin. Called the "Oberlin Band", they were led by Rev. Frederick Ayer. They worked initially for the Western Evangelical Missionary Society, and then the American Missionary Association after 1846. He ran one of the first printing presses in Minnesota, which was used to print books in the Ojibwe language. He established several mission stations and was a fund-raiser for the mission.

They were missionaries to the Sioux and the Ojibwe (Chippewa). Barnard served with his first wife, Sarah, in what are now the states of Minnesota and North Dakota. At some point, Barnard lived in Chatham, Ontario, where he taught formerly enslaved Blacks.

== Early life ==
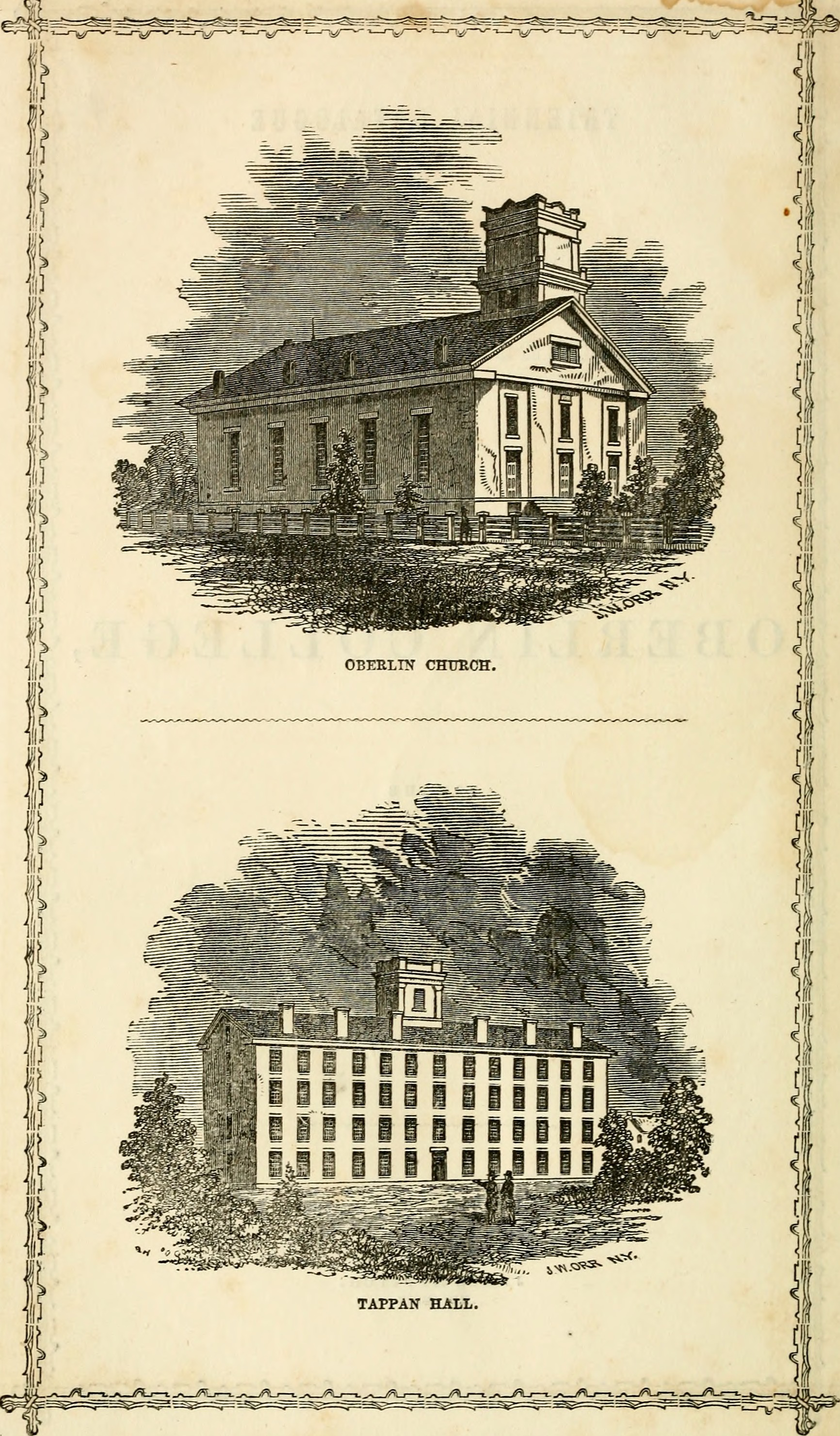
Oberlin College, 1850

Alonzo Barnard was born in Peru, Vermont, on June 2, 1817 to Harriet Byam and Josiah Barnard. He was raised in Pittsfield Township, Ohio, before moving with his family to Elyria, Ohio, when he was 17. He studied at Oberlin College. Before he graduated, he worked as a missionary in 1837 and 1838 in Mississippi and Louisiana, where he witnessed a woman get 150 lashings for accidentally breaking a stalk of cotton. He began working on the Underground Railroad while at Oberlin.

Frederick Ayer, a Presbyterian minister, recruited Barnard and other Oberlin students to become missionaries. Barnard met his first wife at Oberlin. They both graduated in 1843 and were married that year in Rochester, Ohio. Barnard was licensed to preach in June 1843.

== Career ==
Red Lake mission and stations. St. Joseph is west of Pembina. Red River Colony, north of Pembina, is also called Selkirk Settlement.

In 1843, Barnard was a co-founder of the Oberlin mission at Red Lake that served the Ojibwe (Chippewa) in what was then the frontier of northwest Wisconsin Territory (now Minnesota). Other missionaries who established the "Oberlin Band" mission included Frederick Ayer and David B. Spencer—who selected the Red Lake site in 1842— and Sela Wright, Dr. William Lewis, and P.O. Johnston. Traveling through the wilderness, the Barnards and others in the Oberlin party were guided part of the way to Red Lake by employees of the American Fur Company. The missionaries primary goal was to convert Ojibwe people to Christianity. The also had the "impossible task of remaking a way of life" to an agrarian lifestyle. The new mission did not have the money to pay the missionaries salaries. The Western Evangelical Missionary Society provided tools so that the missionaries could build houses and grow food, with the objective of being self-sufficient. They established themselves near the fledging St. Paul, Minnesota, where the only business was a government grist mill and there were three or four buildings. It was called "Devil's Den" for the character of its residents. Barnard traveled 300 miles (480 km) with Ayer to Winnipeg for supplies.

Barnard worked at the Leech Lake mission before going to Cass Lake, where he and Sarah established a mission in 1846 with David Spencer. The missions fell under the auspices of the new staunchly anti-slavery American Missionary Association in 1846 or 1848, when the American Missionary Association took over responsibilities of the Western Evangelical Missionary Society. Barnard raised funds to support the Red Lake missions. He worked in government service for two years, around 1846 to 1848, before taking a missionary position for the American Missionary Association.

Barnard was ordained by Ayer in 1847 and he delivered his first Protestant church service at Pembina (now North Dakota) with Baptist minister James Tanner in 1848 or August 1851. Barnard was the first ordained protestant minister to conduct a church service in North Dakota.

Oberlin alumni and Sunday schools in Ohio donated funds for Barnard to acquire a printing press in 1849. The Minnesota Historical Society stated in 1934 that it was the second use of a printing press in Minnesota history. It was used at Cass Lake to print books, like hymnals, in the Ojibwe language—as well as a book to teach missionaries the Ojibwe language. On Barnard's return to Red Lake from the eastern United States in the summer of 1849, he led adults and children through an arduous trip of sickness due to cholera, wounds from fly and mosquito bites, flooding, portage, extreme heat, and wandering horses. He was appointed postmaster of the Cass Lake post office in 1852. It was one of three post offices for the Red Lake missionary stations.

Alexander Ramsey, Governor of Minnesota Territory, called on the missionaries to establish a mission in the Pembina and St. Joseph area to meet the needs of the Native American community. In 1853, Barnard and his wife established a mission at St. Joseph with David Spencer and his wife Cornelia Spencer. They established a school for Native American and French children at St. Joseph, which was a trading post. They left the station after Sarah died and Cornelia had been shot by the Sioux.

In the meantime, Barnard and Sarah had two children. Sarah's health declined and Barnard moved her to the Red River Colony (Selkirk Settlement) where she received medical care. Her health continued to decline. After ten years of exposure to the cold climate and the hardship, Sarah died of quick consumption (pneumonia) on October 22 or 25 in 1853 at Selkirk Settlement (Red River Colony). She was buried first at the settlement, and then reinterred at their cabin at St. Joseph, as she had requested. Barnard left St. Joseph after some Sioux destroyed the mission. He brought his children to Ohio. Barnard married again in 1854 to Mary McDonald of Pittsfield Township, Ohio.

In 1854, he moved to the Kildonan near Winnipeg of the Red River Colony where he was a missionary. He lived there with his second wife Mary, and also set up a photography studio. He possessed the first printing press in the settlement. Barnard and his wife Mary had a daughter while at Red River. In 1858, he was working as a missionary at Fort Alexander, Manitoba, near Lake Winnipeg, under David Anderson, bishop of Rupert's Land. A letter he wrote to family members in 1858 was published in March 1934 by the Minnesota Historical Society. It described his work among the Minnesotan Chippewa and a trip made in a horse-drawn sled. The mission in Minnesota and North Dakota closed in 1859 after the Oberlin missionaries were exhausted from years of extreme cold, primitive living quarters, isolation at remote mission stations, and resistance.

Having left the area in 1863, Barnard at the mission for Native Americans at Benzonia, Michigan, for the Grand Traverse Band of Ottawa and Chippewa Indians. The Barnards were said by Snodgrass to have "spent their most altruistic years in Pomona, Michigan." Barnard was a missionary in Omena to the Ojibwe. He published the Benzonia Citizen in Benzonia in 1870 and 1871.

He lived in Red Lake, Minnesota, by 1871. He retired in 1883. By 1888, Barnard lived in Wisconsin. He died on April 7, 1905 at his son Dr. James Barnard's house in Pomona of Cleon Township, Manistee County, Michigan. (Note: He was also reported to have died one week later on April 14, 1905.)

== Legacy ==
A memorial called "Martyrs of St. Joe" was established for Sarah Philena Barnard and Cornelia Spencer at the Presbyterian cemetery in Walhalla (near St. Joseph) in June 1888. It was established by the Women's Synodical Missionary Society of North Dakota.

== Bibliography ==
- Bigglestone, William E. (1976). "Oberlin College and the Beginning of the Red Lake Mission". Minnesota History. 45 (1): 21–31. ISSN 0026-5497.
- Schell, J. P. (James Peery) (1911). In the Ojibway country : a story of early missions on the Minnesota frontier. Walhalla, North Dakota: Chas. H. Lee.
- Vleck, Wayne (2004). Dakota Martyrs: The Story You Never Heard. Bunyan Family Books. ISBN 978-0-9706685-0-9.
