= Copemish, Michigan =

- Village
- Location of Copemish, Michigan
- Coordinates: 44°28′50″N 85°55′22″W
- Country: United States
- State: Michigan
- County: Manistee
- Township: Cleon

Area
  - Total: 0.98 sq mi (2.53 km^{2})
  - Land: 0.93 sq mi (2.42 km^{2})
  - Water: 0.042 sq mi (0.11 km^{2})
- Elevation: 817 ft (249 m)

Population (2020)
  - Total: 195
  - Density: 208.9/sq mi (80.65/km^{2})
- Time zone: UTC-5 (Eastern (EST))
  - Summer (DST): UTC-4 (EDT)
- ZIP code: 49625
- Area code: 231
- FIPS code: 26-18040
- GNIS feature ID: 0623800
- Website: villageofcopemish.com

Copemish (/ˈkoʊpmɪʃ/ COPE-mish) is a village in Manistee County of the U.S. state of Michigan. The population was 195 at the 2020 census. The village is within Cleon Township.

== History ==
Copemish was platted in 1889. It was incorporated as a village in 1891. It had previously been used as a site to hold councils by the Ojibwe people.

From the 1940s into the early 1970s, it was the center of a thriving pickling community with multiple large-label pickle producers in the area. Since then, farming has become more localized, and the region's economy centers on Crystal Mountain, a luxury resort 4 miles (6 km) to the northwest.

== Geography ==
Copemish is in northeastern Manistee County, along M-115, which leads northwest 14 miles (23 km) to Benzonia and southeast 12 miles (19 km) to Mesick. Manistee, the county seat, is 31 miles (50 km) to the southwest by county roads, and Cadillac is 32 miles (51 km) to the southeast.

According to the United States Census Bureau, the village of Copemish has a total area of 0.97 square miles (2.51 km^{2}), of which 0.93 square miles (2.41 km^{2}) are land and 0.04 square miles (0.10 km^{2}), or 4.5%, are water. First Creek flows westward through the south side of the village, leading to Bear Creek, a tributary of the Manistee River.

== Demographics ==
Historical population
Census	Pop.	Note	%±
1900	429		—
1910	490		14.2%
1920	284		−42.0%
1930	266		−6.3%
1940	241		−9.4%
1950	255		5.8%
1960	232		−9.0%
1970	237		2.2%
1980	287		21.1%
1990	222		−22.6%
2000	232		4.5%
2010	194		−16.4%
2020	195		0.5%
U.S. Decennial Census

=== 2010 census ===
As of the census of 2010, there were 194 people, 78 households, and 53 families residing in the village. The population density was 208.6 inhabitants per square mile (80.5/km^{2}). There were 109 housing units at an average density of 117.2 per square mile (45.3/km^{2}). The racial makeup of the village was 93.3% White, 1.5% Native American, and 5.2% from other races. Hispanic or Latino of any race were 13.4% of the population.

There were 78 households, of which 33.3% had children under the age of 18 living with them, 50.0% were married couples living together, 12.8% had a female householder with no husband present, 5.1% had a male householder with no wife present, and 32.1% were non-families. 25.6% of all households were made up of individuals, and 12.8% had someone living alone who was 65 years of age or older. The average household size was 2.49 and the average family size was 2.79.

The median age in the village was 42.8 years. 21.6% of residents were under the age of 18; 13.4% were between the ages of 18 and 24; 19.1% were from 25 to 44; 31.4% were from 45 to 64; and 14.4% were 65 years of age or older. The gender makeup of the village was 52.6% male and 47.4% female.

=== 2000 census ===
As of the census of 2000, there were 232 people, 85 households, and 60 families residing in the village. The population density was 267.0 inhabitants per square mile (103.1/km^{2}). There were 105 housing units at an average density of 120.8 per square mile (46.6/km^{2}). The racial makeup of the village was 91.38% White, 4.74% Native American, 0.43% from other races, and 3.45% from two or more races. Hispanic or Latino of any race were 3.45% of the population.

There were 85 households, out of which 37.6% had children under the age of 18 living with them, 44.7% were married couples living together, 18.8% had a female householder with no husband present, and 29.4% were non-families. 22.4% of all households were made up of individuals, and 12.9% had someone living alone who was 65 years of age or older. The average household size was 2.73 and the average family size was 3.20.

In the village, the population was spread out, with 29.7% under the age of 18, 8.2% from 18 to 24, 30.2% from 25 to 44, 18.5% from 45 to 64, and 13.4% who were 65 years of age or older. The median age was 33 years. For every 100 females, there were 95.0 males. For every 100 females age 18 and over, there were 81.1 males.

The median income for a household in the village was $25,357, and the median income for a family was $25,313. Males had a median income of $21,964 versus $16,964 for females. The per capita income for the village was $10,884. About 11.8% of families and 13.2% of the population were below the poverty line, including 9.8% of those under the age of eighteen and 6.3% of those 65 or over.
