= Inland Township, Michigan =

- Civil township
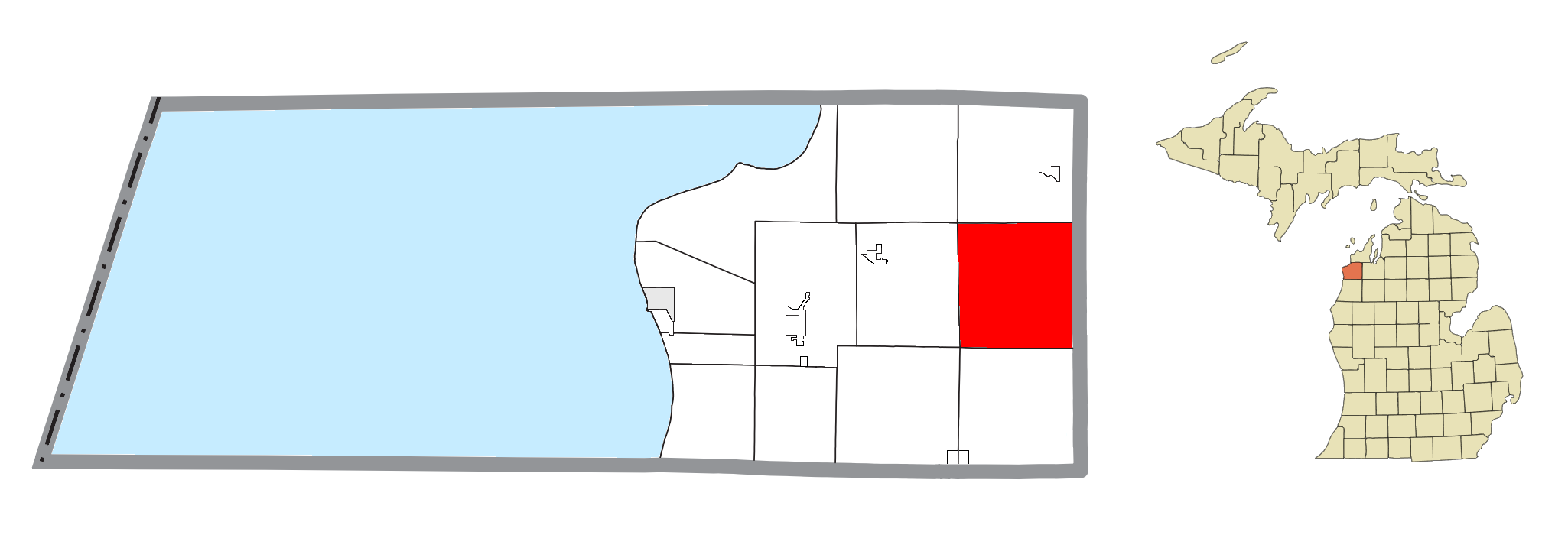
- Location within Benzie County

- Location within the state of Michigan Inland Township (the United States)
- Coordinates: 44°38′42″N 85°52′04″W
- Country: United States
- State: Michigan
- County: Benzie
- Established: 1869

Government
  - Supervisor: David G. Davis Jr.

Area
  - Total: 36.2 sq mi (93.7 km^{2})
  - Land: 35.8 sq mi (92.6 km^{2})
  - Water: 0.42 sq mi (1.1 km^{2})
- Elevation: 869 ft (265 m)

Population (2020)
  - Total: 2,386
  - Density: 58/sq mi (22.3/km^{2})
- Time zone: UTC-5 (Eastern (EST))
  - Summer (DST): UTC-4 (EDT)
- ZIP code(s): 49643, 49683, 49617
- Area code: 231
- FIPS code: 26-40700
- GNIS feature ID: 1626517
- Website: Official website

Inland Township is a civil township of Benzie County in the U.S. state of Michigan. The population was 2,386 at the 2020 census. The township is located in the east of the county, and shares a border with Grand Traverse County. The Platte River flows through the north of the township.

== History ==
The township was organized by the Grand Traverse County board of supervisors under the name "North Climax Township" in April 1867 when Benzie County was still attached to Grand Traverse for administrative purposes. The name was changed to "Inland" in 1869.

== Communities ==
- Bendon is an unincorporated community and census-designated place in the eastern part of the township at the junction of Cinder and Bendon roads at 44°37′59″N 85°50′16″W The settlement developed around a sawmill and was first named "Kentville" after Albert Kent, a farmer who became the first postmaster on April 24, 1888. It was given a station on the now abandoned Chicago and West Michigan Railway. The post office was renamed Bendon on June 30, 1892, and operated until March 31, 1954.
- Inland Corners is a locale and former post office in the eastern part of the township at the junction of Honor Highway (US 31) and Lake Ann Road/Bendon Road at 44°39′33″N 85°50′15″W. The post office named Inland operated from February 17, 1866 until October 31, 1903.
- Platte River is an unincorporated community in the west of the township, at 44°39′42″N 85°56′2″W.
- The village of Beulah is to the west in Benzonia Township, and the Beulah ZIP code 49617 also serves a portion of western Inland Township.
- The community of Interlochen is to the east in Green Lake Township in Grand Traverse County, and the Interlochen ZIP 49643 also serves most of Inland Township.
- The village of Lake Ann is to the north in Almira Township, and the Lake Ann ZIP code 49650 also serves a small area in northern Inland Township.
- The village of Thompsonville is to the south in Colfax and Weldon townships, and the Thompsonville ZIP code 49683 also serves portions of southern Inland Township.

== Geography ==
According to the United States Census Bureau, Inland Township has a total area of 36.2 square miles (93.7 km^{2}), of which 35.8 square miles (92.6 km^{2}) is land and 0.42 square miles (1.1 km^{2}), or 1.13%, is water.

=== Major highway ===
- US 31 serves as the township's primary east–west thoroughfare, despite being signed north–south.

== Demographics ==
As of the census of 2000, there were 1,587 people, 620 households, and 437 families residing in the township. The population density was 44.3 inhabitants per square mile (17.1/km^{2}). There were 723 housing units at an average density of 20.2 per square mile (7.8/km^{2}). The racial makeup of the township was 95.84% White, 0.50% African American, 1.64% Native American, 0.13% Asian, 0.25% from other races, and 1.64% from two or more races. Hispanic or Latino of any race were 1.01% of the population.

There were 620 households, out of which 34.4% had children under the age of 18 living with them, 57.7% were married couples living together, 8.1% had a female householder with no husband present, and 29.5% were non-families. 21.8% of all households were made up of individuals, and 4.8% had someone living alone who was 65 years of age or older. The average household size was 2.56 and the average family size was 3.00.

In the township the population was spread out, with 26.4% under the age of 18, 7.6% from 18 to 24, 33.2% from 25 to 44, 23.3% from 45 to 64, and 9.6% who were 65 years of age or older. The median age was 35 years. For every 100 females, there were 106.9 males. For every 100 females age 18 and over, there were 104.6 males.

The median income for a household in the township was $38,125, and the median income for a family was $40,750. Males had a median income of $29,509 versus $21,284 for females. The per capita income for the township was $15,935. About 5.7% of families and 7.8% of the population were below the poverty line, including 10.8% of those under age 18 and 6.1% of those age 65 or over.
