= Dubonnet (disambiguation) =

Dubonnet may refer to:

- André Dubonnet, French flying ace, sportsman and inventor
- Emile Dubonnet, French aviator
- Dubonnet, an alcoholic drink
- Dubonnet Cup, English football exhibition cup game
- Dubonnet suspension A type of independent front suspension for vehicles
- Lake Dubonnet, lake in Michigan
