= Cleon Township, Michigan =

- Township
- Location within Michigan Location within the United States
- Coordinates: 44°28′16″N 85°53′17″W
- Country: United States
- State: Michigan
- County: Manistee

Area
  - Total: 36.15 sq mi (93.6 km^{2})
  - Land: 36.07 sq mi (93.4 km^{2})
  - Water: 0.08 sq mi (0.21 km^{2})
- Elevation: 883 ft (269 m)

Population (2020)
  - Total: 1,063
  - Density: 29.5/sq mi (11.4/km^{2})
- Time zone: UTC-5 (Eastern (EST))
  - Summer (DST): UTC-4 (EDT)
- ZIP Codes: 49625 (Copemish); 49683 (Thompsonville)
- FIPS code: 26-101-16380
- GNIS feature ID: 1626096
- Website: www.cleontownship.com

Cleon Township is a civil township of Manistee County located in the U.S. state of Michigan. The population was 1,063 at the 2020 census, up from 957 in 2010.

== Geography ==
The township occupies the northwest corner of Manistee County, with Benzie County to the north, Wexford County to the east, and Grand Traverse County touching its northeast corner. According to the U.S. Census Bureau, the township has a total area of 36.1 square miles (93 km^{2}), of which 0.08 square miles (0.21 km^{2}), or 0.23%, are water.

=== Highways ===
- M-115 is a highway within the township, following a diagonal northwest–southeast routing. The highway passes through the village of Copemish, connecting it with Benzonia to the northwest and Mesick to the southeast.

== Communities ==
- Cleon was an unincorporated community on the Manistee River that was settled in 1865. It had a post office from 1871 until 1902.
- Copemish is a village within the west of the township.

== Demographics ==
As of the census of 2000, there were 932 people, 351 households, and 252 families residing in the township. The population density was 25.9 inhabitants per square mile (10.0/km^{2}). There were 478 housing units at an average density of 13.3 per square mile (5.1/km^{2}). The racial makeup of the township was 95.92% White, 0.43% African American, 1.93% Native American, 0.54% from other races, and 1.18% from two or more races. Hispanic or Latino of any race were 2.04% of the population.

There were 351 households, out of which 34.8% had children under the age of 18 living with them, 57.0% were married couples living together, 9.4% had a female householder with no husband present, and 28.2% were non-families. 21.1% of all households were made up of individuals, and 8.0% had someone living alone who was 65 years of age or older. The average household size was 2.66 and the average family size was 3.13.

In the township the population was spread out, with 27.3% under the age of 18, 7.6% from 18 to 24, 29.4% from 25 to 44, 24.9% from 45 to 64, and 10.8% who were 65 years of age or older. The median age was 36 years. For every 100 females, there were 112.3 males. For every 100 females age 18 and over, there were 107.3 males.

The median income for a household in the township was $30,547, and the median income for a family was $32,841. Males had a median income of $26,016 versus $20,694 for females. The per capita income for the township was $13,523. About 9.1% of families and 13.2% of the population were below the poverty line, including 12.7% of those under age 18 and 17.5% of those age 65 or over.
