= Gwen Frostic Studio =

- U.S. National Register of Historic Places
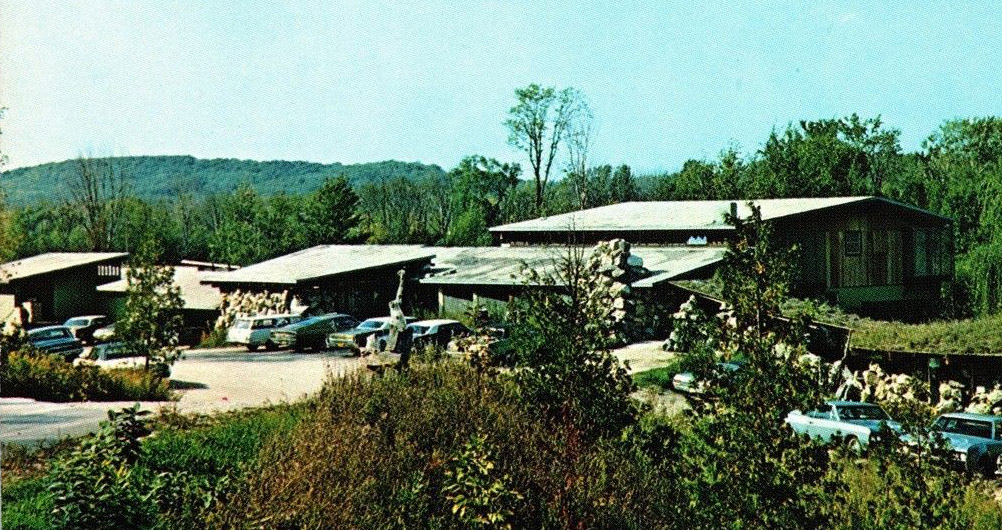
- Studio c. 1975
- Interactive map
- Location: 5140 River Rd. Benzonia Township, Michigan
- Coordinates: 44°37′8″N 86°8′15″W
- Built: 1964
- Built by: Jim Rogers
- Architect: Gwen Frostic
- Architectural style: Organic
- NRHP reference No.: 1000063211
- Added to NRHP: March 22, 2021

The Gwen Frostic Studio is an artist studio located at 5140 River Road in Benzonia Township, Michigan. It was built by artist and entrepreneur Gwen Frostic, who used it as her home and business from 1964 until her death in 2001. It was listed on the National Register of Historic Places in 2021.

== History ==
Gwen Frostic was born in Sandusky, Michigan in 1906. She began a metalworking business in the late 1920s in Wyandotte, Michigan, but during and after World War II pivoted to linoleum block printing. In 1951, her father retired and moved to Frankfort, Michigan. Gwen became attracted to the area and began spending summers there, transitioning to full time residence in 1955. She re-opened her studio in Frankfort, and by 1963 the business had expanded multiple times and had seven employees. However, when the town began considering draining the nearby swamp, the source of much of Frostic's inspiration, she decided to move her studio.

Frostic purchased a 40-acre parcel southeast of Frankfort and hired contractor Jim Rogers too construct a new studio. The design was very organic, incorporating features on the plot and blending with the surrounding landscape. The new studio, encompassing 9000 square feet, opened on April 26, 1964. Frostic's business steadily grew, and over the next 15 years additional space was added, increasing the size of the studio to 21,000 square feet. Frostic continued to live and work at the studio until her death in 2001.

Frostic willed her property to friends Kirk and Pam Lorenz, who owned a local restaurant. They continued her business and made some improvements to the property. Unfortunately, the Lorenzes overleveraged their two properties, and the bank foreclosed on both. Frostic's acreage was divided up, and Kim and Greg Forshee purchased the studio and surrounding land, along with Frostic's print copyrights. They continue to operate the studio.

== Description ==
The Gwen Frostic Studio is wood-frame and concrete block structure, tucked into the surrounding hillside. It was built in an organic style, with incremental additions made over time to the original 9000-square foot structure over a period of 15 years. Some walls and buttresses incorporate boulders taken from the surrounding property. The walls and rooflines are intentionally laid out in a haphazard way, mimicking and blending in with the surrounding low hills.
