= Michigan Legacy Art Park =

Outdoor sculpture park near Thompsonville, Michigan

Coordinates: 44.5195°N 86.00263°W

The Michigan Legacy Art Park is a 30-acre (120,000 m^{2}) outdoor sculpture park located near Thompsonville, Michigan, on the grounds of Crystal Mountain Resort. It is open year-round and includes 40 works of art and 1.6 miles (2.6 km) of hiking trails.

The Michigan Legacy Art Park was founded in 1995 by artist David Barr. It is a non-profit, 501(c)3 organization. Barr was awarded the Governor's Michigan Artist Award in 1988. In his acceptance speech, he told the audience of his desire to create a Michigan Art Park – a place where artists could tell the story of our state in and through the fundamental materials of nature. In his assessment of our state at that time, there was something missing – a place that expresses Michigan's history through the arts. Illustrations or artifacts of that history already existed, but he wanted contemporary artists to bring that history to fresh and vivid life.

Michigan Legacy Art Park inspires awareness, appreciation and passion for Michigan's history, culture and environment through the arts. The mission is primarily fulfilled through an outdoor sculpture collection that expresses Michigan's history and extensive educational opportunities.

== Artwork ==
Michigan Legacy Art Park includes artwork by the following artists:

- Bill Allen
- David Barr
- Lois Beardslee
- Maureen Bergquist Gray
- Dewey Blocksma
- Will Cares
- Robert Caskey
- Byung Chan Cha
- Caroline Court
- Sergio De Giusti
- Shawn Flagg
- John DeHoog
- David Greenwood
- Fritz Horstman
- Patricia Innis
- Gary Kulak
- Michael McGillis
- Rebecca Nagle
- Sandy Osip
- Jim Pallas
- David Petrakovitz
- Martin Puryear
- John Richardson
- John Sauvé
- Nolan Simon
- Lois Teicher
- Joe Zajac
- Brian Ferriby
- Brian Nelson
- Kaz McCue
- Pamela Ayres
- Leslie Laskey
- Donald Rau, Jr.
- Les Scruggs
- David Williams
- Michelle Schulte-Leask
- Eric Troffkin
