= Mills Community House =

- U.S. National Register of Historic Places
- Michigan State Historic Site
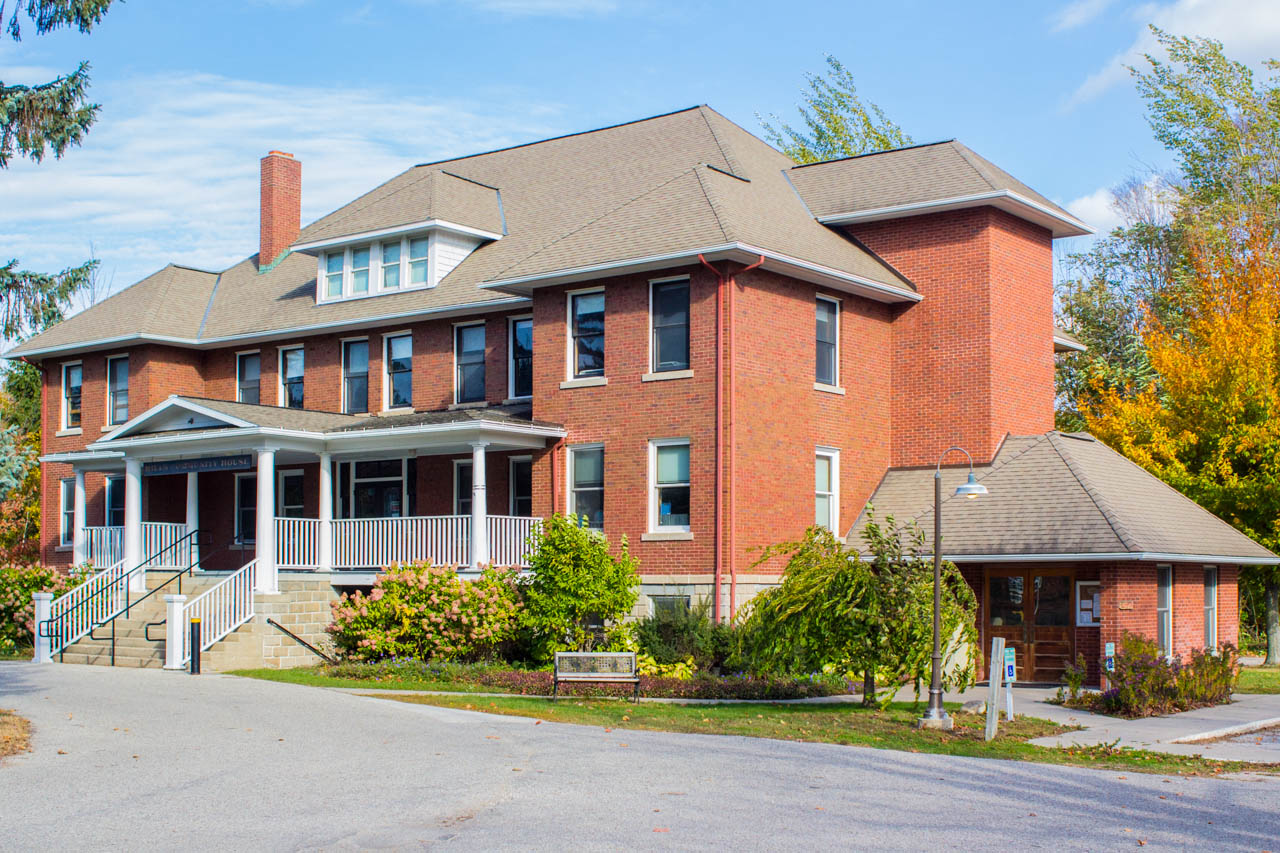
- A photo of the Mills Community House

- Location within Michigan Location within the United States
- Interactive map
- Location: 891 Michigan Ave., Benzonia, Michigan
- Coordinates: 44°37′8″N 86°6′5″W
- Area: 1 acre (0.40 ha)
- Built: 1909
- NRHP reference No.: 72000593

Significant dates
- Added to NRHP: August 21, 1972
- Designated MSHS: August 21, 1972

The Mills Community House, also known as the Mills Cottage and the Benzonia Public Library, is a former dormitory located at 891 Michigan Avenue in Benzonia, Michigan. It is significant for its association with Bruce Catton (an alumnus of the academy and Pulitzer Prize-winning historian), who lived there when his father was president of Benzonia Academy. It was designated a Michigan State Historic Site and listed on the National Register of Historic Places in 1972.

== History ==
The village of Benzonia was founded as an educational colony in 1858 by the Reverend Charles E. Bailey and four families from Oberlin, Ohio. They immediately set about building an educational institution, holding classes beginning in 1860. They constructed a two-story frame building and chartered the community school, Grand Traverse College, in 1863. Within five years, the building burned, and the school took over a three-story frame building, dubbing it "East Hall." This was the only building used by the college for a number of years, until the 1890s when a new building was constructed, and East Hall was turned into the girl's dormitory, dining room, and president's quarters. In 1891, the school was reorganized as Benzonia College; in 1900 the school became Benzonia Academy.

In 1906, George Catton became president of Benzonia Academy. He and his family, including his son Bruce Catton (a future alumnus of the academy and Pulitzer Prize-winning historian) lived in East Hall, the girls' dormitory. In early 1909, East Hall was destroyed by fire. Mills Cottage was constructed that year as a replacement for East Hall. It was named for the Rev. Harlow S. Mills, who led the local Congregationalist congregation from 1896 to 1916 and made substantial contributions to the construction of the building in honor of his late wife. The cottage included the girls' dormitory, the dining room, and living quarters for the academy headmaster.

In 1918, Benzonia Academy closed its doors due to financial difficulties. In 1925, when it became clear that the academy would not reopen, Mills Cottage was deeded to the Benzonia Congregational Church. The building was renovated to include an auditorium on the upper level and a meeting space in the lower level. The Benzonia Public Library leased the middle floor. During the 1930s, Benzonia High School used the top floor as a gymnasium, theater, and dance floor. Later, other community groups used the space for plays, parties, and meetings. During World War II Mills House was used to house women of the Woman's Land Army of America.

Later, the top floor was closed due to safety concerns. However, the Benzonia Library still operated out of the building, and the community still used the meeting space on the first floor. In the 1990s, the building was renovated to include a full kitchen and new restrooms. In 2002, the Mills Community House Association was formed, and the building was deeded to them. In 2008, additional renovations made it possible to reopen the top floor, which now hosts performances by the Benzie County Players performances, musical concerts, historical lectures, and other gatherings. It is the only remaining building from Benzonia Academy.

== Description ==
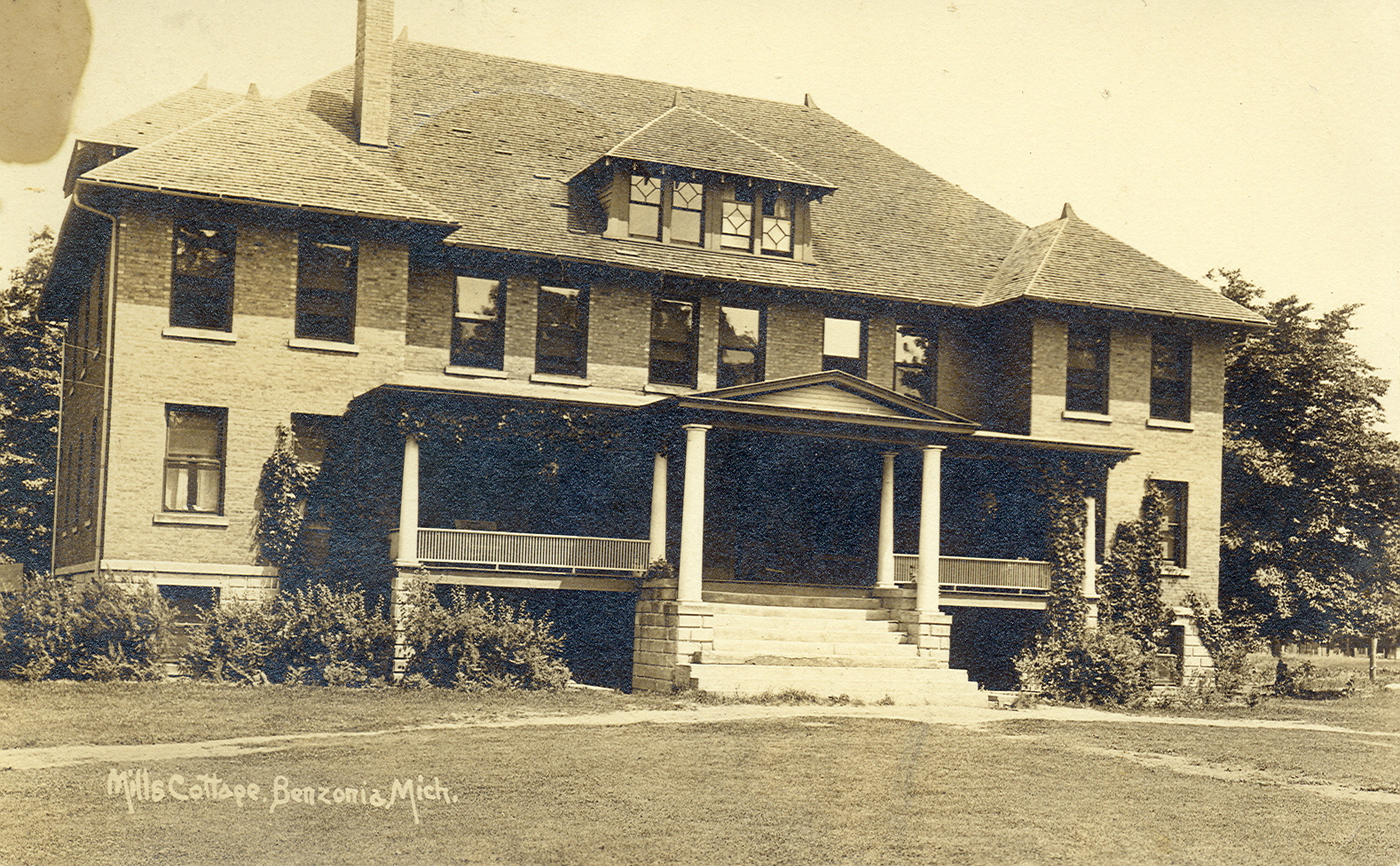
Mills Cottage, 1913

Mills Cottage is a rectangular, 2 1/2-story brick structure on a stone foundation with a steeply pitched hip roof having wide eaves and exposed rafters. The center section is fronted by a wide porch having Tuscan columns, and the roof is punctuated in the center by a hip roof dormer holding four windows. The end sections, similarly roofed, project slightly. Inside, an auditorium is on the top floor, and the library takes up the main floor.
