= Crystal Mountain, Michigan =

- Census-designated place (CDP) & unincorporated community
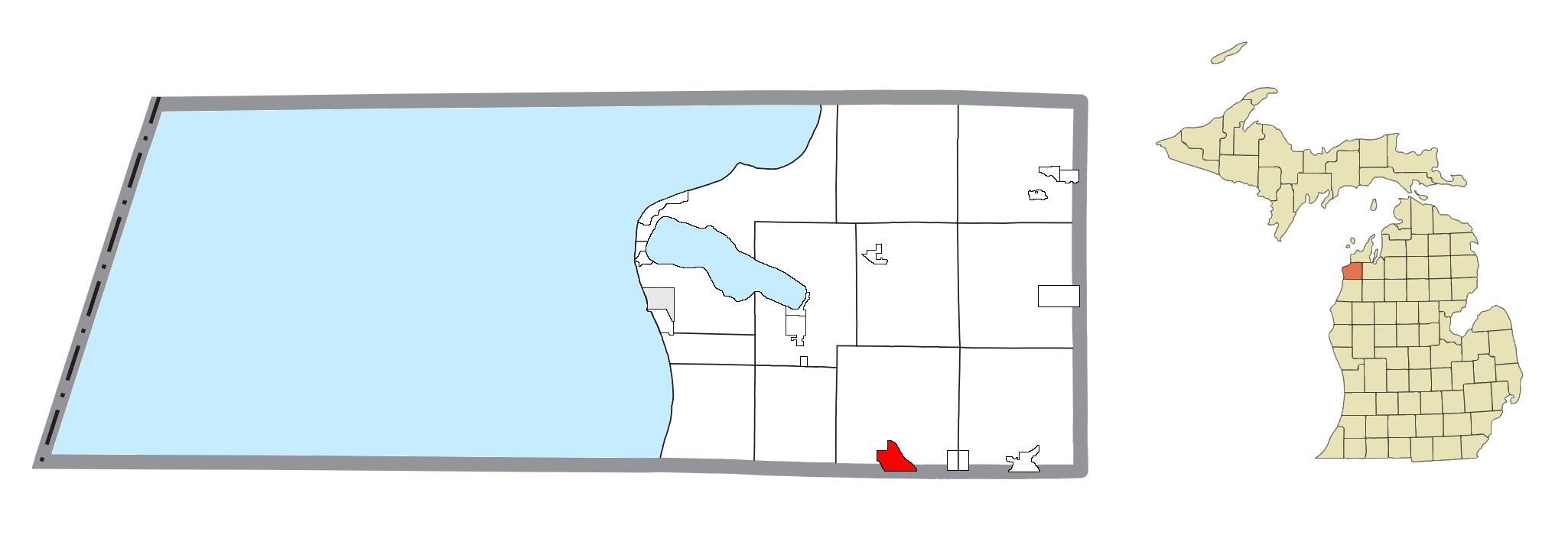
- Location within Benzie County

- Location within the state of Michigan Crystal Mountain (the United States)
- Coordinates: 44°31′03″N 85°59′34″W
- Country: United States
- State: Michigan
- County: Benzie
- Township: Weldon

Area
  - Total: 1.78 sq mi (4.62 km^{2})
  - Land: 1.78 sq mi (4.60 km^{2})
  - Water: 0.0077 sq mi (0.02 km^{2})
- Elevation: 791 ft (241 m)

Population (2020)
  - Total: 73
  - Density: 41.1/sq mi (15.85/km^{2})
- Time zone: UTC-5 (Eastern (EST))
  - Summer (DST): UTC-4 (EDT)
- ZIP code(s): 49683 (Thompsonville)
- Area code: 231
- FIPS code: 26-19195
- GNIS feature ID: 2583732

Crystal Mountain is an unincorporated community and census-designated place in Benzie County in the U.S. state of Michigan. The population was 73 at the 2020 census. Crystal Mountain is located within Weldon Township.

The CDP includes the Crystal Mountain Resort & Spa and Michigan Legacy Art Park.

== Geography ==
The Crystal Mountain CDP is located in the southern part of Weldon Township in southern Benzie County. The CDP's southern border is the Manistee County line. The northeast edge of the CDP is formed by M-115, the Cadillac Highway.

According to the United States Census Bureau, the Crystal Mountain CDP has a total area of 1.7 square miles (4.3 km^{2}), of which 0.008 square miles (0.02 km^{2}), or 0.46%, is water. The majority of the CDP's area is taken up by the Crystal Mountain Resort, which occupies all of the Buck Hills southwest of M-115, as well as flat land at the base of the hills.

== History ==
The community of Crystal Mountain was listed as a newly-organized census-designated place for the 2010 census, meaning it now has officially defined boundaries and population statistics for the first time.

== Demographics ==
Historical population
Census	Pop.	Note	%±
2010	54		—
2020	73		35.2%
U.S. Decennial Census

Y-o-Y Change
Total Population	100	69.5%
Male Population	51	27.5%
Female Population	49	157.9%

Male population 51%

Female population 49%

		Y-o-Y Change
Median Age	50.5	-27.9%
Citizen US Born	100	69.5%

Citizen US Born 100%

		Y-o-Y Change
Moved from Same County	4	N/A
Moved from Same State	11	N/A
Same House as Last Year	85	44.1%

.
