= Jennie W. Erickson =

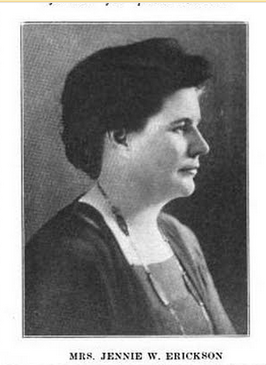
Jennie W. Erickson, from a 1919 publication.

Jennie Waters Erickson (1876–1961) was a probation officer and county superintendent of schools in Arkansas. Her work was publicized nationally as an example of progressive policy towards delinquency, dependency, and truancy.

== Early life ==
Jennie Waters was from Michigan, the daughter of Albert Horace Waters, a lumberman, and Mary Geneva Canavan Waters (later Jones). She attended school in Benzonia, Michigan, and trained as a teacher in Cape Girardeau, Missouri.

== Career ==
=== Probation officer ===
Jennie W. Erickson was chief probation officer of the juvenile court of Pulaski County, Arkansas from 1917 to 1920, in charge of mother's pensions and the county's juvenile detention home in Little Rock. She went to Washington to secure federal funding for a girls' reformatory in Arkansas. Her work, focused on training programs, aesthetic and social supports, was publicized nationally as an example of progressive policy towards deliquency, dependency, and truancy.

Erickson chaired the Committee on Rural Probation of the National Probation Association. Emphasizing the paternal role she saw for probation officers, she declared that "If the rural probation officer serves the county in no other capacity than that of the watchful State parent in protecting the rights of children who are lost to educational and religious training, but who are considered as an industrial factor only, then the probation officer has indeed found a high calling."

=== Superintendent of Schools ===
From 1920 to 1922, Erickson served as the appointed superintendent of schools for Pulaski County, the first woman in that position, and reportedly the highest paid woman official in Arkansas at the time. One of her innovations was to arrange for 1000 laying chickens to be given to 1000 girls in the county, along with instruction to raise and care for chicks; the goal was to teach rural girls to produce better poultry and eggs for family nutrition and a supplemental income. She also took particular interest in the training of rural school teachers. She resigned the position in 1922.

=== Other activities ===
Erickson was a dairy farmer and a schoolteacher as a young woman. She also organized a literary club for other farm wives. From 1917 She was also counted among Arkansas supporters of women's suffrage, and helped start a settlement house in Little Rock in 1915. In 1929 she was appointed to the board of the Arkansas State Hospital, and was chairman of that board in 1937. She resigned from that position at the end of 1937.

== Personal life ==
Jennie W. Erickson was married to Emil Erickson and the mother of daughters Carol (b. 1899), Ann (b. ) and Mary (b. 1903). She married again in 1921, to Frank H. Dodge, an attorney and judge in Little Rock. She died in 1961, aged 84 years; her gravesite is in Thompsonville, Michigan.
