= Long Lake (Grand Traverse County, Michigan) =

Lake in Grand Traverse County, Michigan, USA

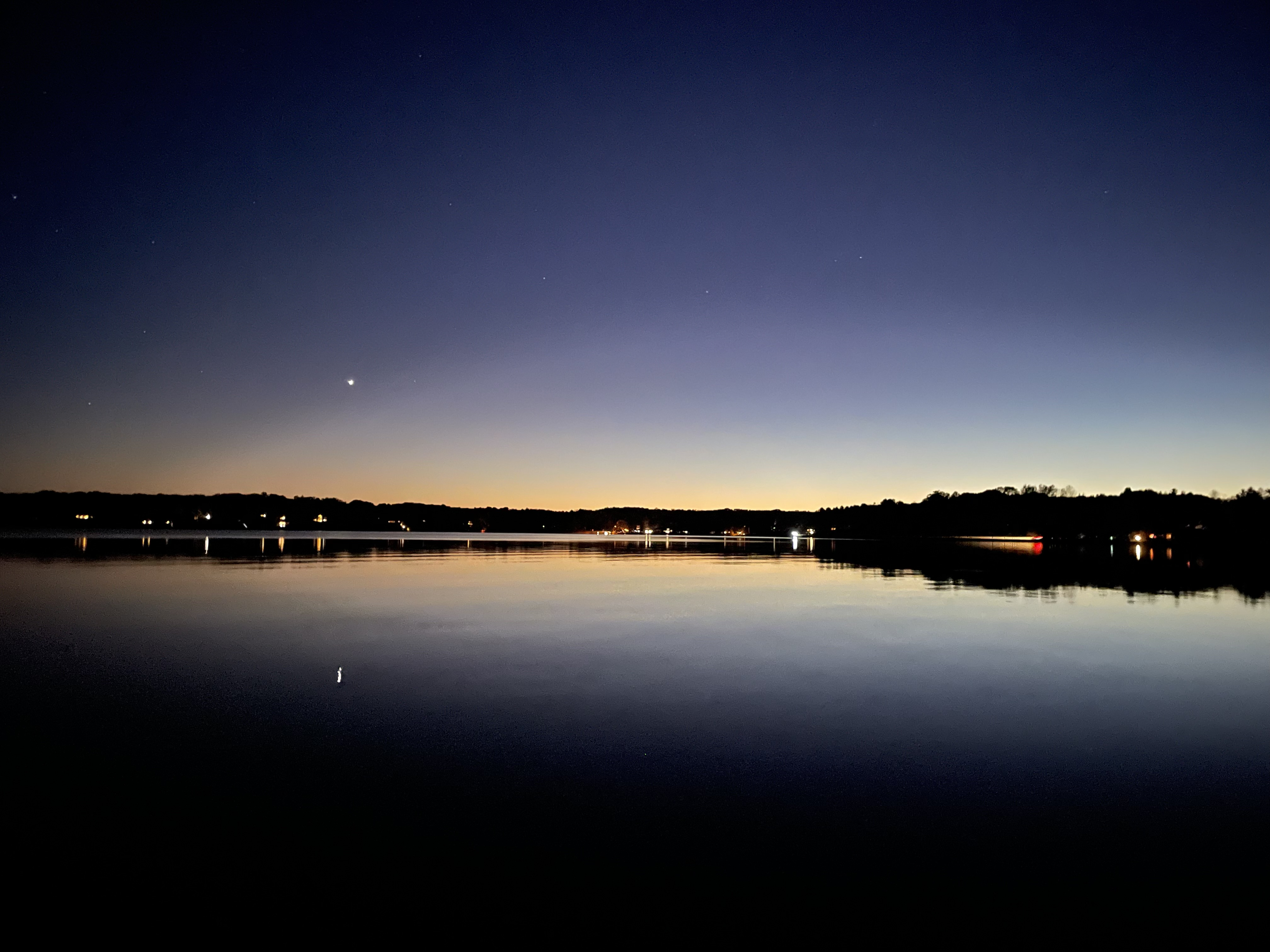
- Dusk view of Long Lake from the north shore

- Location within Michigan
- Location: Long Lake and Green Lake townships, Grand Traverse County, Michigan, U.S.
- Coordinates: 44°43′23″N 85°45′28″W
- Type: Lake
- Primary inflows: Mickey Lake, Ruth Lake, Fern Lake, Page Lake
- Primary outflows: Platte River
- Max. length: 3.96 m (13.0 ft)
- Max. width: 1.86 m (6 ft 1 in)
- Surface area: 2,860 acres (12 km^{2})
- Average depth: 26 ft (8 m)
- Max. depth: 88 ft (27 m)
- Shore length^{1}: 16.71 mi (26.9 km)
- Surface elevation: 846 feet (258 m)
- Islands: Picnic Island, Long Island, Fox Island, South Island, Brush Island
- Settlements: Neal (ghost town), Long Lake Peninsula
- ^{1} Shore length is not a well-defined measure.

Long Lake is a large lake in the Lower Peninsula of the U.S. state of Michigan. Located about 6 miles (9.7 km) west of Traverse City, Long Lake is the largest lake in Grand Traverse County, and the 30th-largest inland lake in Michigan by surface area. Its maximum depth of 70 feet (21 m) makes it the fifth-deepest lake in Grand Traverse County. Long Lake is home to the largest nesting population of loons in the Lower Peninsula.

Long Lake is primarily within the eponymous Long Lake Township, although a small portion extends south into Green Lake Township. The lake is the primary source of the Platte River, which flows west through Benzie County to Lake Michigan.

== Geography ==
Long Lake is located in Northern Michigan, in northwestern Grand Traverse County. It is mainly situated within Long Lake Township, of which it has lent its name, although a small portion of the southern end of the lake lies within Green Lake Township.

Long Lake is the primary headwaters of the Platte River, which flows westward from the lake, warming as it flows to Lake Michigan in neighboring Benzie County.

The Carter-Strong Bird Sanctuary is a protection area at the southwestern end of the lake.

== Recreation ==
Long Lake is well-known in the area for being a popular recreation lake.

There are three public parks on the shores of the lake:

- Taylor Park
- Gilbert Park
- Crescent Shores Park & Boat Launch

Many homeowners on the lake also own boats. Boaters on the lake choose to swim, water ski, and fish. Many varieties of fish live in the lake, but fishers tend to find bluegill, largemouth bass, muskellunge, northern pike, rock bass, smallmouth bass, sunfish, walleye and yellow perch.

=== Islands ===
Below is a list of the islands in Long Lake:

- Picnic Island (formerly Covell Island)
- Long Island
- Fox Island
- South Island
- Brush Island

South and Fox islands are owned by the Grand Traverse Regional Land Conservancy.

== See also ==
- List of lakes in Michigan
