= Bass Lake (Long Lake Township, Michigan) =

Lake in the state of Michigan, United States

- Location within Michigan
- Location: Long Lake and Green Lake townships, Grand Traverse County, Michigan, U.S.
- Coordinates: 44°41′23.88″N 85°42′42.77″W
- Type: Lake
- Primary outflows: Beitner Creek (Boardman River)
- Surface area: 343 acres (1 km^{2})
- Max. depth: 29 ft (9 m)
- Surface elevation: 883 ft (269 m)
- Islands: Namaste Island, Greene Island, Germaine Island, Caroline Island, Phantom Island

Bass Lake is a lake in the U.S. state of Michigan. Located in Grand Traverse County, Bass Lake is part of the Boardman River and Grand Traverse Bay watersheds. While primarily in Long Lake Township, some of the lake extends south into Green Lake Township.

On the southwestern shore of Bass Lake lies Camp Carvela, a residential summer camp.

== See also ==
- List of lakes in Michigan
