= Platte River (Michigan) =

River in Michigan

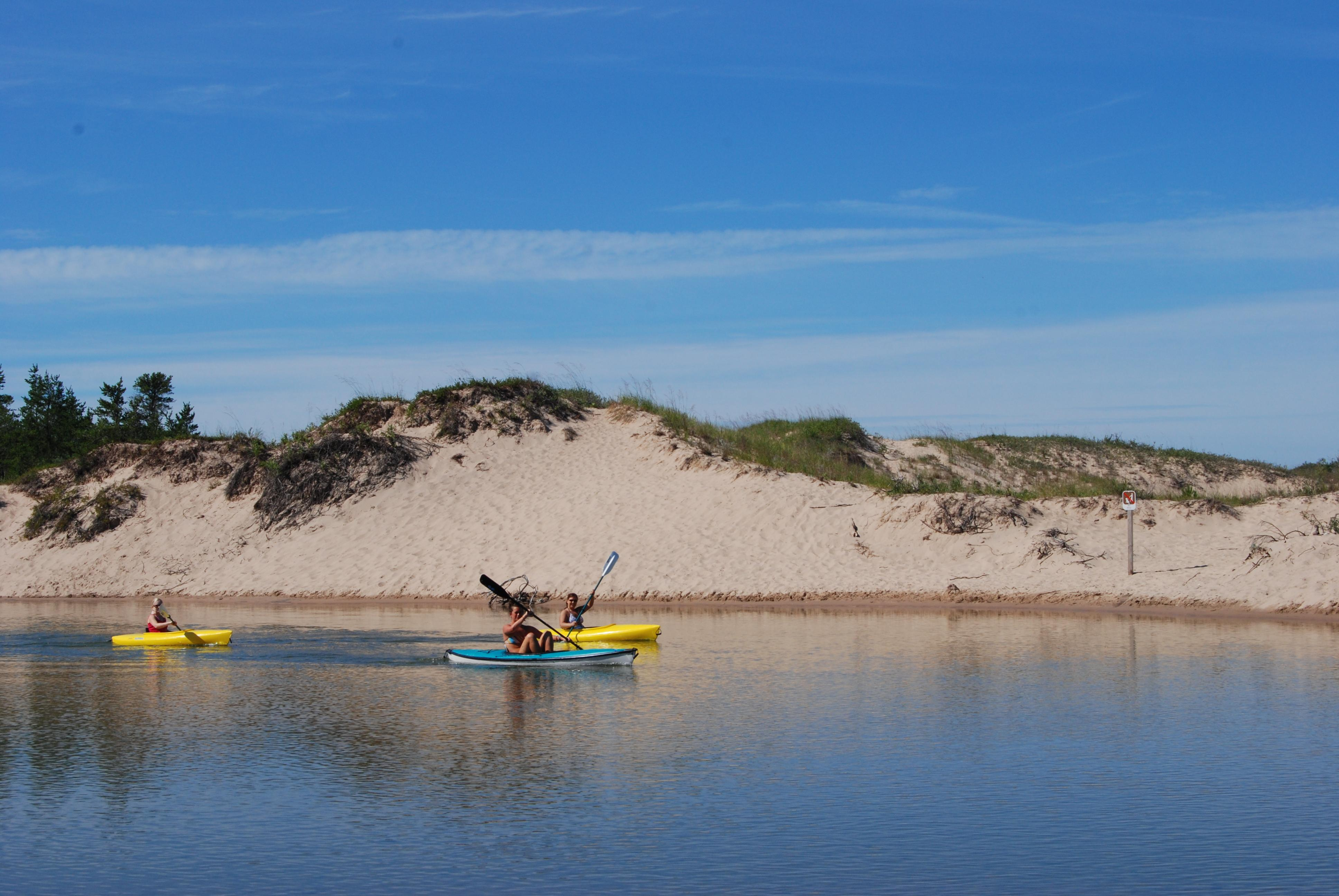
- Kayakers in the Platte River near its mouth

Location
- Country: United States
- State: Michigan
- Settlements: Lake Ann, Platte River

Physical characteristics
- Source
  - location: Long Lake near Interlochen
  - coordinates: 44°41′17.7″N 85°45′15.6″W
- Mouth
  - location: Platte Bay Lake Michigan in Lake Township
  - coordinates: 44°43′54″N 86°9′10.3″W
- Length: 29.5 mi (47.5 km)

Basin features
- Progression: Long Lake → Platte River → Lake Michigan → Lake Huron
- Tributaries
  - left: Brundage Creek
  - right: North Branch Platte River

The Platte River (/plæt/) is a 29.5-mile-long (47.5 km) river in the northwestern Lower Peninsula of Michigan. Beginning at Long Lake in Grand Traverse County, the Platte River flows west across Benzie County before ending at Platte Bay, a small bay of Lake Michigan, in the Sleeping Bear Dunes National Lakeshore. The river drains an area of about 193 square miles (500 km^{2}).

== Course ==
The Platte River originates from Long Lake in Grand Traverse County flowing southwest into Lake Dubonnet, and then flowing west and eventually turning north, flowing into Mud Lake and then into Lake Ann. From the east, additional drainage into Lake Ann comes from Ransom Creek, which drains Ransom Lake, and in turn Bellows Lake and Lyons Lake. From Lake Ann, the Platte River runs west and south. It collects the outflow of Upper and Lower Woodcock Lakes then flows through Bronson Lake. The river continues southwest. The Platte River State Fish Hatchery is on the river at the eponymous community Platte River and Brundage Creek joins the river just to the east. The main branch receives Collison Creek just east of Honor, Michigan. At the Platte River Campground in the state forest, the river turns north west flowing toward Platte Lake.

The north branch of the Platte River receives the outflow of Little Platte Lake shortly before joining the main branch just before the combined flow enters Big Platte Lake.

The lower part of the Platte River begins as the outflow of Platte Lake, south of Empire, Michigan. It runs generally northwest, widening into Loon Lake about a third of the way through its course from Platte Lake. Its mouth is at Platte Bay of Lake Michigan at Platte River Point. Mud Lake is a tributary upstream of Loon Lake.

The river above Platte Lake tends to be much swifter and colder than the lower stretch, which is warmed considerably by its passage through the relatively shallow, 3-mile (4.8 km) stretch of Platte Lake.

There are three boat launches, a canoe launch and three picnic areas on the river in the national lakeshore.

== Drainage basin ==
The Platte River drains the following municipalities (italicized municipalities are those which the river drains but does not flow through):

- Benzie County
  - Almira Township
  - Benzonia Township
  - Colfax Township
  - Homestead Township
  - Inland Township
  - Lake Township
  - Platte Township
- Grand Traverse County
  - Garfield Township
  - Green Lake Township
  - Long Lake Township
- Leelanau County
  - Elmwood Township
  - Empire Township
  - Kasson Township
  - Solon Township
