= Long Lake Township, Michigan =

- Charter township
- Charter Township of Long Lake
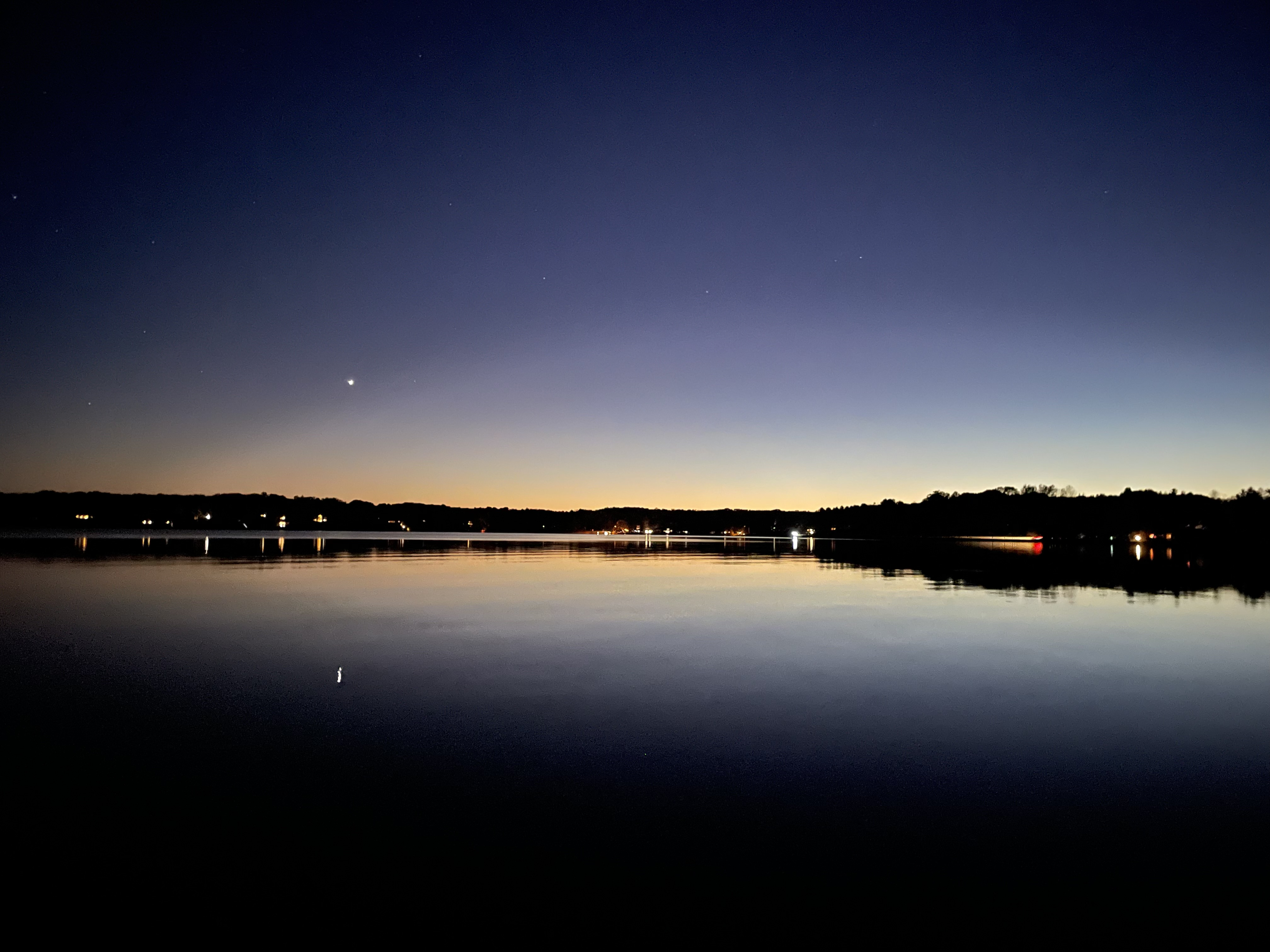
- Dusk view of the eponymous Long Lake

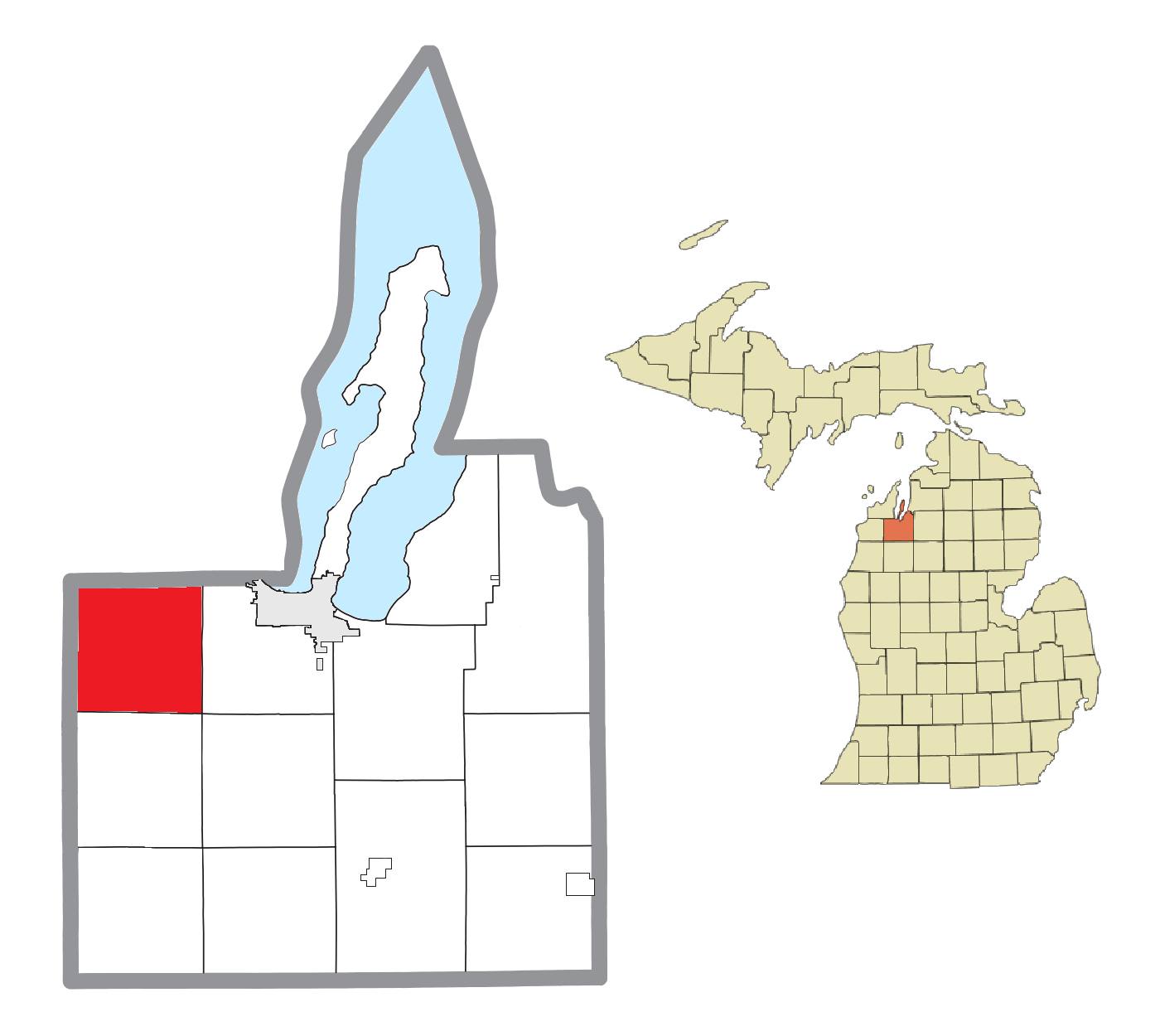
- Location within Grand Traverse County

- Location within the state of Michigan Long Lake Township (the United States)
- Coordinates: 44°43′13″N 85°45′05″W
- Country: United States
- State: Michigan
- County: Grand Traverse
- Organized: January 1867
- Named for: Long Lake

Government
  - Supervisor: Ron Lemcool
  - Clerk: Ronda Robinson

Area
  - Total: 35.6 sq mi (92.3 km^{2})
  - Land: 30.1 sq mi (78.0 km^{2})
  - Water: 5.5 sq mi (14.3 km^{2})
- Elevation: 879 ft (268 m)

Population (2020)
  - Total: 9,956
  - Estimate (2025): 10,101
  - Density: 254/sq mi (98.1/km^{2})
- Time zone: UTC-5 (Eastern (EST))
  - Summer (DST): UTC-4 (EDT)
- ZIP code(s): 49643 (Interlochen); 49684, 49685 (Traverse City)
- Area code: 231
- FIPS code: 26-49240
- GNIS feature ID: 1626640

Long Lake Township, officially the Charter Township of Long Lake, is a charter township of Grand Traverse County in the U.S. state of Michigan. The population was 9,956 at the 2020 census, an increase from 8,662 at the 2010 census.

Long Lake Township is one of three charter townships in Grand Traverse County, the others being East Bay Township and neighboring Garfield Township. Long Lake, from which the township takes its name, is the largest lake entirely within Grand Traverse County. Much of Long Lake Township is suburban due to its proximity to Traverse City.

== History ==
The Long Lake township area was initially settled in 1862 when Ira Chase and his brother-in-law Eliphalet Fillmore traveled from Whitewater township to Grand Traverse County to select land. The next few years saw the gradual influx of families who cleared forested areas to establish farms. An annual cycle of farming in the summer, logging in the winter, and maple sugaring in the spring began. The end of the Civil War brought additional settlers and in November 1866 a group of men petitioned the Board of Supervisors of Grand Traverse County to form "Viola Township" from Township 27 north, Range 12 west, of old Traverse Township. In January 1867, Long Lake Township was formally organized.

The population of the township was 333 in 1870, rising to 434 in 1880. The most notable historical incident in the early 1870s was the probable murder of John Eley, his wife Philopena, and their two daughters in July 1871. The family disappeared and neighbors later discovered blood on the walls of the family's house. A hired hand, William Benton, was the prime suspect, since he claimed to have been sold the Eleys' farm. The case was never solved.

In the late 1870s, members of the Society of Friends (Quakers) began to move to the township from Indiana. A smaller number of people from Bohemia also settled in the area. The township's population was 663 persons in 152 households in 1900.

Farming continued to be the primary source of income. The rise of the auto industry in the late 1910s to 1920s led many younger people to leave the area to settle in the Detroit and Flint areas of Michigan. Today, many residents of Long Lake township are retirees or commute to work in Traverse City.

Long Lake Township converted from a civil township to a charter township in 2022.

== Geography ==
According to the United States Census Bureau, the township has a total area of 35.6 square miles (92 km^{2}), of which 30.1 square miles (78 km^{2}) is land and 5.5 square miles (14 km^{2}) (15.52%) is water.

The most defining feature of the township is the eponymous Long Lake. Most of the lake is within the township, although a small portion extends south into Green Lake Township. The lake drains through the Platte River to Lake Michigan. The second largest lake in the township is Bass Lake, which is also shared to the south with Green Lake Township.

Long Lake Township lies within miles of both Traverse City and Lake Ann. Much of Long Lake Township is suburbanized because of the township's proximity to Traverse City.

=== Adjacent townships ===
- Solon Township, Leelanau County (north)
- Elmwood Charter Township, Leelanau County (northeast)
- Garfield Township (east)
- Blair Township (southeast)
- Green Lake Township (south)
- Inland Township, Benzie County (southwest)
- Almira Township, Benzie County (west)
- Kasson Township, Leelanau County (northwest)

=== Transportation ===
Long Lake Township contains only one state trunkline highway, M-72. The highway runs east–west along the northern border of the township. To the east, the highway enters Traverse City, and to the west, the highway enters Leelanau County and runs toward Empire. The highway is considered "transpeninsular", as it traverses the entire Lower Peninsula from Empire on Lake Michigan to Harrisville on Lake Huron.

A major local thoroughfare is North Long Lake Road. Also known as County Road 610, North Long Lake Road runs east–west a few miles south of M-72, serving local residents. The roadway continues east into Garfield Township, and enters Traverse City as West Front Street. To the west of Long Lake Township, County Road 610 continues into Lake Ann as Maple Street, and continues west in northern Benzie County.

Long Lake Township contains no railways or airfields.

== Communities ==
- Cedar Run is a ghost town in the northwestern part of the township, at 44°45′46″N 85°48′49.30″W. Cedar Run was given a post office in 1868, and was traversed by a line of the Manistee and North-Eastern Railroad in 1892.
- Friend was a rural post office in 1881 and 1882.
- Long Lake is an unincorporated community on the northern shores of Long Lake, along North Long Lake Road. The community was established by Hannah, Lay & Company as the location of a sawmill west of Traverse City in 1871. The community had a post office from 1873 to 1878, and 1884 to 1887. The community is located at 44°44′51.6″N 85°45′52.2″W.
- Long Lake Peninsula, a residential community on the peninsula in Long Lake (44°42′33″N 85°44′19″W).
- Neal was the location of a post office lasting from 1890 to 1903.

Long Lake Township is located within 2 miles (3.2 km) of the city of Traverse City, to its east. The village of Lake Ann is also just 1 mile (1.6 km) west of Long Lake Township's border with Benzie County.

== Demographics ==
As of the census of 2000, there were 7,648 people, 2,742 households, and 2,111 families residing in the township. The population density was 254.0 inhabitants per square mile (98.1/km^{2}). There were 3,210 housing units at an average density of 106.6 per square mile (41.2/km^{2}). The racial makeup of the township was 97.19% White, 0.26% African American, 0.72% Native American, 0.44% Asian, 0.26% from other races, and 1.12% from two or more races. Hispanic or Latino of any race were 0.93% of the population.

There were 2,742 households, out of which 42.6% had children under the age of 18 living with them, 66.6% were married couples living together, 7.5% had a female householder with no husband present, and 23.0% were non-families. 16.6% of all households were made up of individuals, and 4.3% had someone living alone who was 65 years of age or older. The average household size was 2.77 and the average family size was 3.15.

In the township the population was spread out, with 29.5% under the age of 18, 7.3% from 18 to 24, 32.1% from 25 to 44, 22.6% from 45 to 64, and 8.6% who were 65 years of age or older. The median age was 36 years. For every 100 females, there were 102.1 males. For every 100 females age 18 and over, there were 99.0 males.

The median income for a household in the township was $48,826, and the median income for a family was $55,386. Males had a median income of $37,303 versus $26,920 for females. The per capita income for the township was $21,943. About 2.7% of families and 3.0% of the population were below the poverty line, including 2.3% of those under age 18 and 5.9% of those age 65 or over.

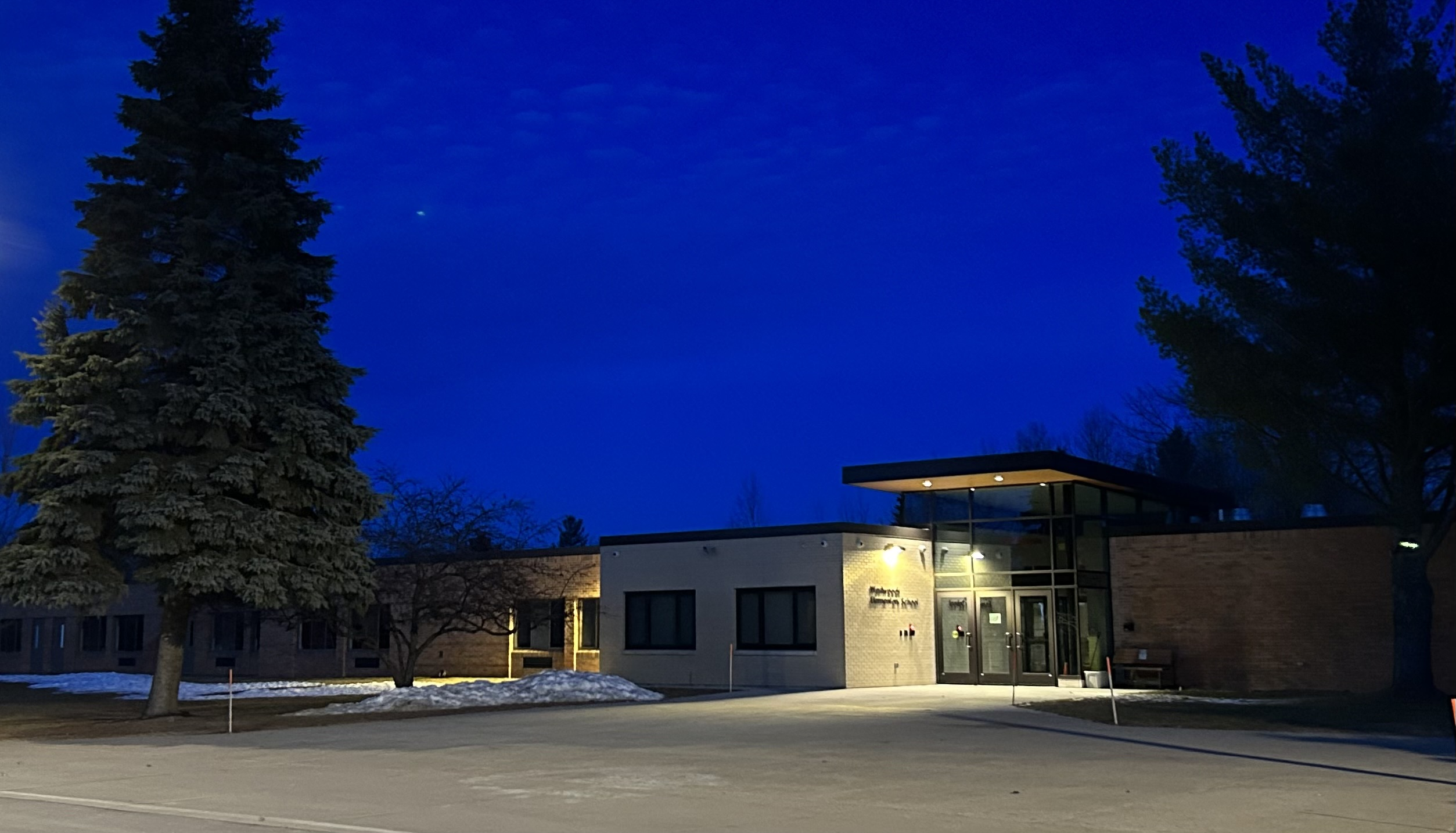
Westwoods Elementary School, located in the southwest of the township.

== Education ==
The entirety of Long Lake Township is zoned within Traverse City Area Public Schools. The district operates two elementary schools within the township – Long Lake Elementary School and Westwoods Elementary School. Middle and high school students are zoned to Traverse City West Middle School and Traverse City West Senior High School, respectively, both of which are located in neighboring Garfield Township.

== Notable people ==
- Demas T. Craw, posthumous Medal of Honor recipient, was born and raised in Long Lake Township.
- Robert P. Griffin, Justice of the Michigan Supreme Court from 1987 to 1994; United States Senator from 1966 to 1979; U.S. Representative from 1957 to 1966 – also buried at Linwood Cemetery.
