= Bendon, Michigan =

- Census-designated place (CDP) & unincorporated community
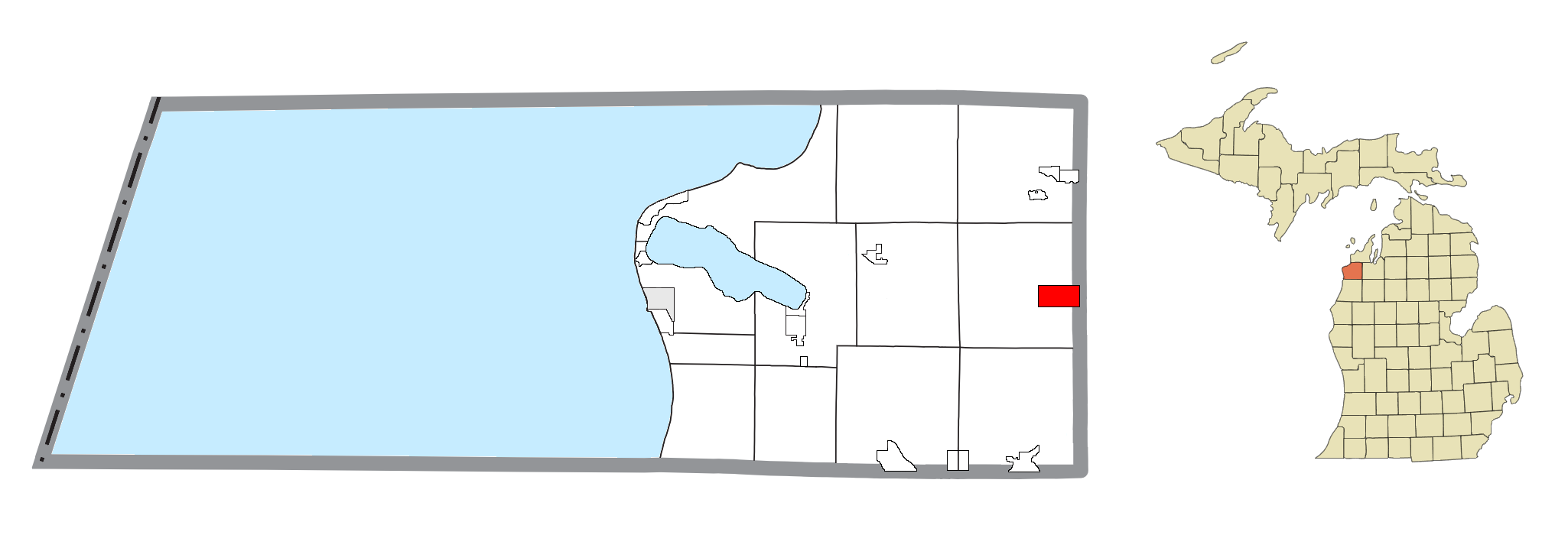
- Location within Benzie County

- Location within the state of Michigan Bendon (the United States)
- Coordinates: 44°37′59″N 85°50′16″W
- Country: United States
- State: Michigan
- County: Benzie
- Township: Inland
- Settled: 1888

Area
  - Total: 2.00 sq mi (5.19 km^{2})
  - Land: 2.00 sq mi (5.19 km^{2})
  - Water: 0 sq mi (0.00 km^{2})
- Elevation: 846 ft (258 m)

Population (2020)
  - Total: 210
  - Density: 104.8/sq mi (40.45/km^{2})
- Time zone: UTC-5 (Eastern (EST))
  - Summer (DST): UTC-4 (EDT)
- ZIP code(s): 49643 (Interlochen)
- Area code: 231
- FIPS code: 26-07220
- GNIS feature ID: 0621089

Bendon is an unincorporated community and census-designated place in Benzie County in the U.S. State of Michigan. The population was 210 at the 2020 census. Bendon is located within Inland Township.

== Geography ==
Bendon is located in the eastern part of Inland Township in eastern Benzie County. Bendon's eastern border is the Grand Traverse County line. The center of the community is at the intersection of Bendon Road and Cinder Road.

According to the United States Census Bureau, the Bendon CDP has a total area of 2.0 square miles (5.2 km^{2}), all land.

== History ==
The settlement developed around a sawmill and was first named "Kentville" after Albert Kent, a farmer who became the first postmaster on April 24, 1888. It was given a station on the now abandoned Chicago and West Michigan Railway. The post office was renamed "Bendon" on June 30, 1892, and operated until March 31, 1954.

The community of Bendon was listed as a newly organized census-designated place for the 2010 census, meaning it now has officially defined boundaries and population statistics for the first time.

== Demographics ==
Historical population
Census	Pop.	Note	%±
2010	208		—
2020	210		1.0%
U.S. Decennial Census
