= Lake Dubonnet =

Lake in Grand Traverse County, Michigan, United States of America

- Mud Lake, Floating Island Lake
- Location within Michigan
- Location: Green Lake and Long Lake townships, Grand Traverse County, Michigan
- Coordinates: 44°41′10.63″N 85°47′22.07″W
- Type: Reservoir
- Primary inflows: Platte River
- Primary outflows: Platte River
- Surface area: 645 acres (3 km^{2})
- Surface elevation: 840 ft (256 m)
- Islands: numerous

Lake Dubonnet (/ˌduːbəˈneɪ/ DOO-bə-nay) is a reservoir in Grand Traverse County, Michigan. Part of the Platte River system, the lake was originally two smaller, separate bodies of water known as Big Mud Lake and Little Mud Lake. In 1956, the Platte River was dammed, forming the larger Lake Dubonnet.

== See also ==
- List of lakes of Michigan
