= Platte Lake (Michigan) =

Lake in the state of Michigan, United States

- Location within Michigan
- Location: Benzie County, Michigan (Northwest Michigan)
- Coordinates: 44°41.48′N 86°05.63′W
- Primary inflows: Platte River
- Primary outflows: Platte River (eventually Lake Michigan)
- Basin countries: United States
- Max. length: 3.3 miles (5.3 km)
- Max. width: 1.6 miles (2.6 km)
- Surface area: 2,550 acres (10.3 km^{2})
- Average depth: 24 feet (7.3 m)
- Max. depth: 95 feet (29 m)
- Surface elevation: 584 feet (178 m)

Platte Lake (sometimes referred to as Big Platte Lake) is one of the many lakes located in the northwestern part of Michigan's lower peninsula. There are two lakes in Benzie County, Michigan based on the name Platte, the other being Little Platte. Platte Lake covers 2,516 acres (1,018 ha) and is 3.3 miles (5.3 km) long and 1.6 miles (2.6 km) wide. The average depth of Platte Lake is 24 feet (7.3 m) deep. The deepest point of the lake is measured at 95 feet (29 m) deep. The Platte River flows through the lake at a speed of 120 cubic feet per second (3.4 m^{3}/s). This means the residence time for the water in Platte Lake is 6 months. Also meaning that every hour 3,300,000 US gallons (12,000,000 L) of water are passing through Platte Lake. The Platte River flows through Platte Lake and continues downstream through Loon Lake until it finally reaches Lake Michigan.

== Geography ==
Platte Lake is located in Benzie County, which was molded into a land full of sand dunes by the glacial formations. Along with the sand dunes, the glaciers also left many lakes in the area, not only in Benzie but throughout the area. Platte Lake is located at an elevation of 584 feet (178 meters) above sea level. Platte Lake is one of the largest of the lakes located in Benzie Michigan.

== Geology ==
Platte Lake is surrounded by sand dunes that were formed by glaciers and it is believed that these same glaciers also formed the many lakes in the Benzie area, not excluding Platte Lake. These sand dunes and glacial formations have since 1970 been protected under state law. The lakes bottom is filled with sand much like the sand that rolls over the massive dunes that overlook Lake Michigan and that make up Sleeping Bear Dunes National Lakeshore.

== Lake environment ==
Seagulls are extremely prevalent in the area, as well as various species of ducks and loons. Hawks and wild turkeys are often seen around the lake. Occasionally spotted is the bald eagle. In the water there are many types of fish as well as water turtles. Around the lake, white-tailed deer, bears, and red-tailed foxes can be found.

=== Species of fish ===
Platte Lake has many different species of fish. The types of fish include, small mouth and large mouth bass, rock bass, northern pike, walleye, brown bullhead, chinook salmon, strickbacks, bluegill and perch.

=== Invasive species ===
A foreign species of mussel, called the zebra mussel has over the past 20 years inhabited Platte Lake as well as many other lakes in the Great Lake area. These mussels help water clarity, but they are not native to the Northern Michigan area. They have been transported to North America by large vessels from Asia. They are a serious problem because they have nearly eliminated the native clam population in Platte Lake and many other bodies of water in the area.

=== Climate ===
The climate around the lake is pretty steady. Winters are dreadfully cold filled with a large amount of snow, and the summers are pretty warm but never too hot. During the winter the average low is 17 degrees F and the average high is 31 degrees F. In the summer the average low is 55 degrees F and the average high is 78 degrees F. It is not unusual for it to be extremely windy on and around the lake.

== Tourism ==
Platte Lake is known for its vacation homes that are visible from every spot on the water. Benzie Michigan is extremely tourist oriented and is known for having a lot to do. There are many shops and restaurants not on the lake, but near the lake. You can go canoeing down Platte River. You are only minutes from the city of Frankfort, Michigan which is packed with cool shops, amazing restaurants and is located on the shores of Lake Michigan. There is also a pier, which you can walk out to view the spectacular lighthouse. Platte Lake is also minutes away from the most photographed lighthouse in Michigan, Point Betsie Light. Platte Lake is also near Sleeping Bear Dunes National Lakeshore, which is an amazing mound of sand dunes that overlook Lake Michigan from one side, and Glen Lake from the other. There are over a dozen golf courses in the area as well. The things to do in Benzie county are unlimited.

=== Summer rentals ===
There are an enormous amount of summer rental homes located on Platte Lake. Many people vacation there. During the summer tourists like to boat, water ski, wake board, tube, and sailboat on the water. Because Platte Lake is known for having such a variety of species of fish, fishing is also very popular on Platte Lake.

=== Fishing ===
To legally be able to fish on Platte Lake, you must have a fishing license.

== See also ==
- List of lakes in Michigan
