= Crystal Mountain (Michigan) =

Ski area in Michigan, United States

Coordinates: 44°31′12″N 85°59′32″W

- Interactive map of Crystal Mountain
- Location: Thompsonville, Weldon Township, Michigan
- Vertical: 314 ft (96 m).
- Top elevation: 1,132 ft (345 m).
- Base elevation: 757 ft (231 m).
- Skiable area: 103 acres (420,000 m^{2})
- Trails: 58
- Longest run: One half mile
- Lift system: 8 total: 1 detachable high-speed quad chair, 3 fixed-grip quad chairs, 2 triple chairs, and 2 "carpet style" surface lifts
- Lift capacity: 12,400 skiers per hour
- Terrain parks: 3
- Snowfall: 132" average per year
- Snowmaking: 98%
- Night skiing: 27 slopes lighted for night skiing
- Website: www.crystalmountain.com

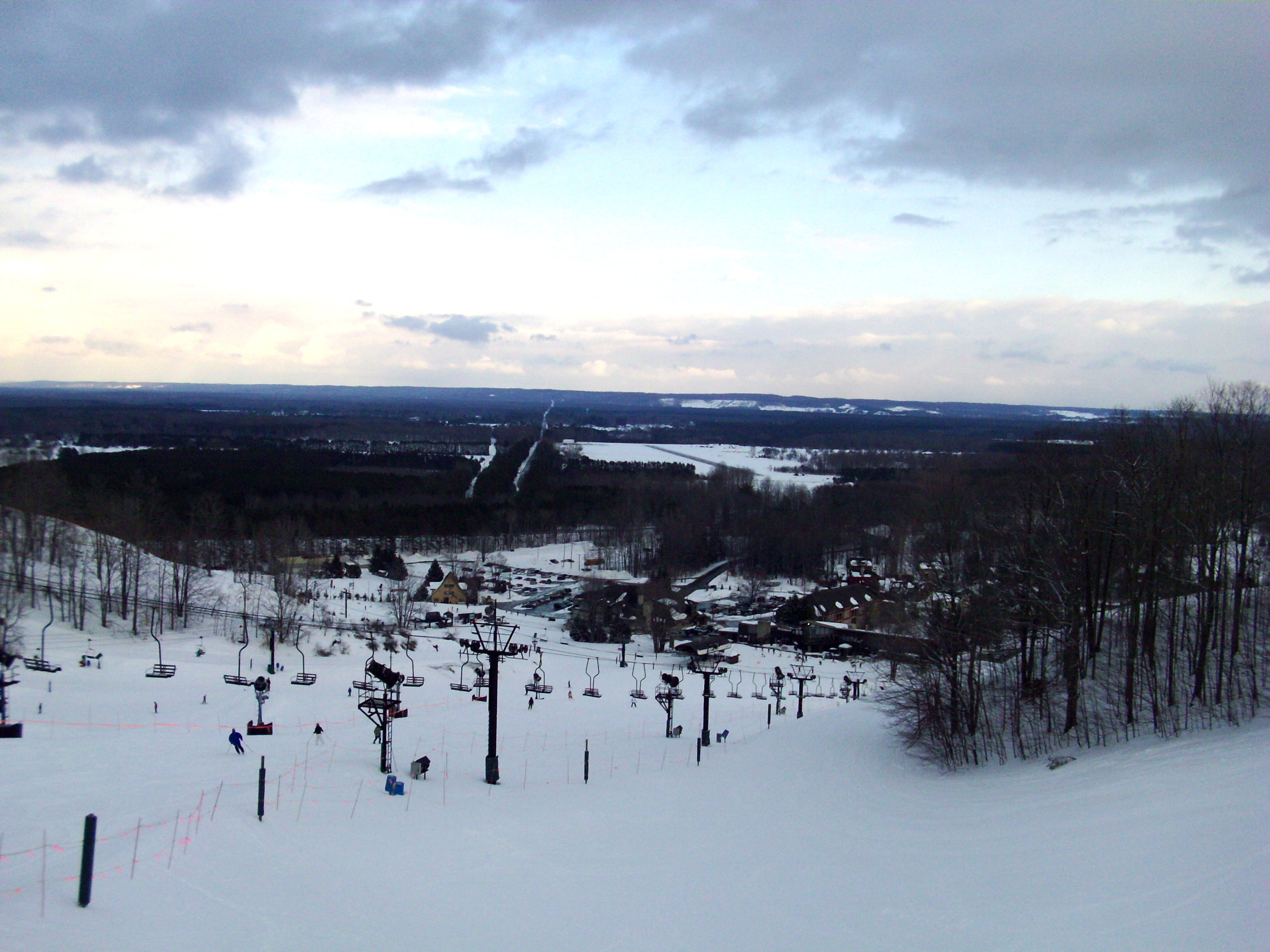
View of the "Cheers" chair lift and resort from near one of the peaks. Thompsonville air strip (7Y2) visible in the background

Crystal Mountain Resort is a resort and conference center located near the village of Thompsonville in Benzie County, Michigan. The resort's area forms the Crystal Mountain census-designated place. The resort offers recreational activities including downhill and cross country skiing the winter months, and golf, water activities, and an alpine slide in other seasons. The resort was founded in 1956. In March 2015 the resort announced it was planning a $9 million expansion project that will add new ski runs, lifts, lodging, retail and other amenities.

== Skiing and snowboarding ==
The resort's skiing and snowboarding season runs from approximately Thanksgiving weekend to early April, depending on weather conditions. The resort receives an average of 11' of natural snowfall, however artificial snow can be made when natural snowfall is lacking. The resort has 59 downhill slopes, 6 chairlifts and 2 surface lifts, with 27 slopes lighted for night skiing during the peak ski season.

== Golf ==
Crystal Mountain features two 18-hole championship golf courses. The Betsie Valley course, the resort's original golf course, plays at 6,567 yards (6,005 m) from the blue tees. The Mountain Ridge course, which hosts the Michigan Women's Open each summer, plays 7,077 yards (6,471 m) from the blue tees.

The resort's golf school offers golf instruction to players of all ages and ability levels.

== Recreational facilities ==
Crystal Mountain maintains Michigan's only Alpine slide. The resort also maintains biking trails available during the Summer.

== Lodging ==
Overnight lodging is available in over 250 hotel rooms, suites, condominiums, townhouses and vacation homes, which are located near the skiing and golf facilities throughout the resort property.

== Awards and recognition ==
Crystal Mountain is one of 60 golf courses in Michigan to be certified by the Michigan Turfgrass Environmental Stewardship Program. Its golf school has been named a Top 25 golf school by Golf Magazine. Crystal Mountain was named among Conde Nast Traveler's Ten Best Family Ski Resorts in the U.S. and Canada in 2017, and also ranked the resort #1 in the United States for Family Reunions in 2015.
