= Grand Traverse College =

19th-century college in Benzonia, Michigan, United States

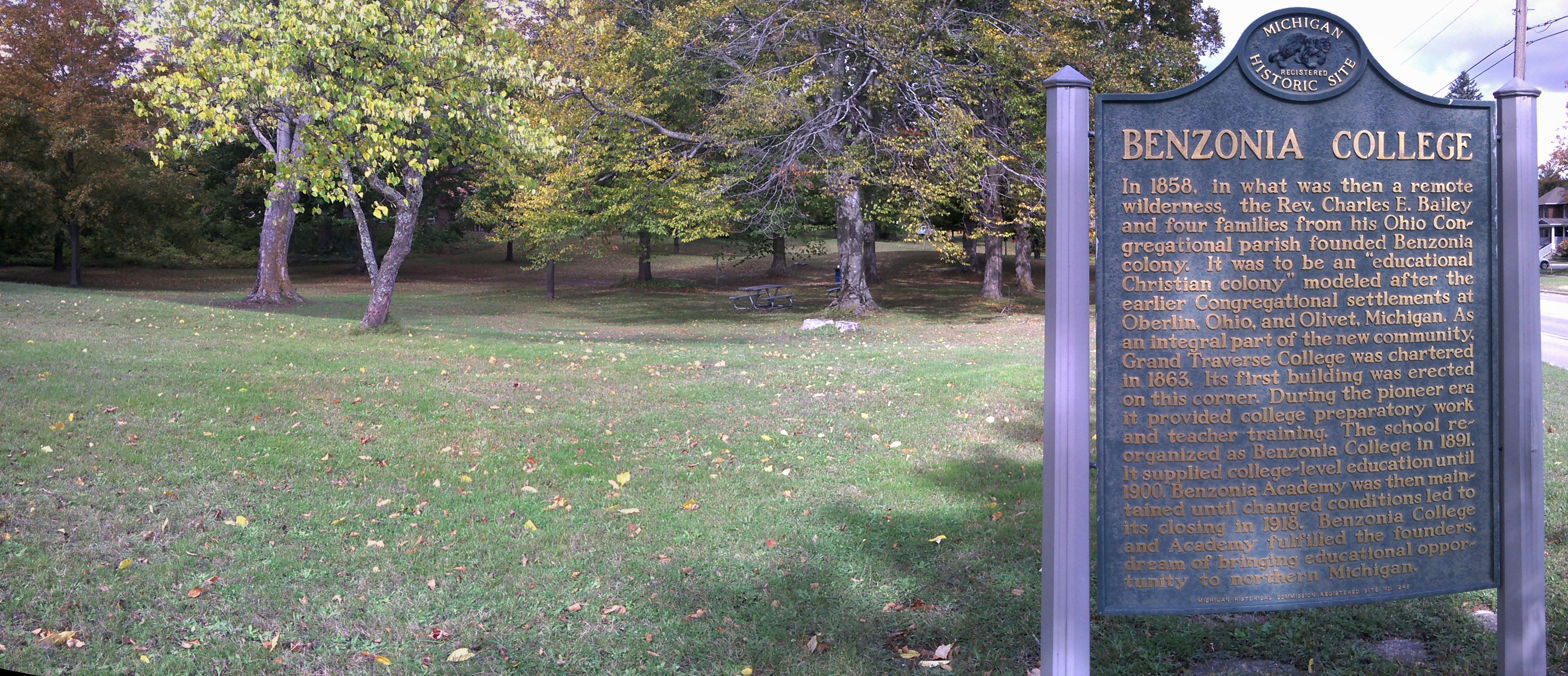
A marker commemorating the college

Grand Traverse College, latter known as Benzonia College, was a private college at Benzonia, Michigan, United States, during the 19th century.

The college was patterned after the model of Olivet College and Oberlin College. It opened in 1858 and offered primarily college preparatory and teacher training curriculum. In 1891 it changed its name to Benzonia College. It stopped offering college courses in 1900 but continued as Benzonia Academy to offer college preparatory courses until 1918.

== Sources ==
- Text of Historical Marker
