= Weldon Township, Michigan =

- Civil township
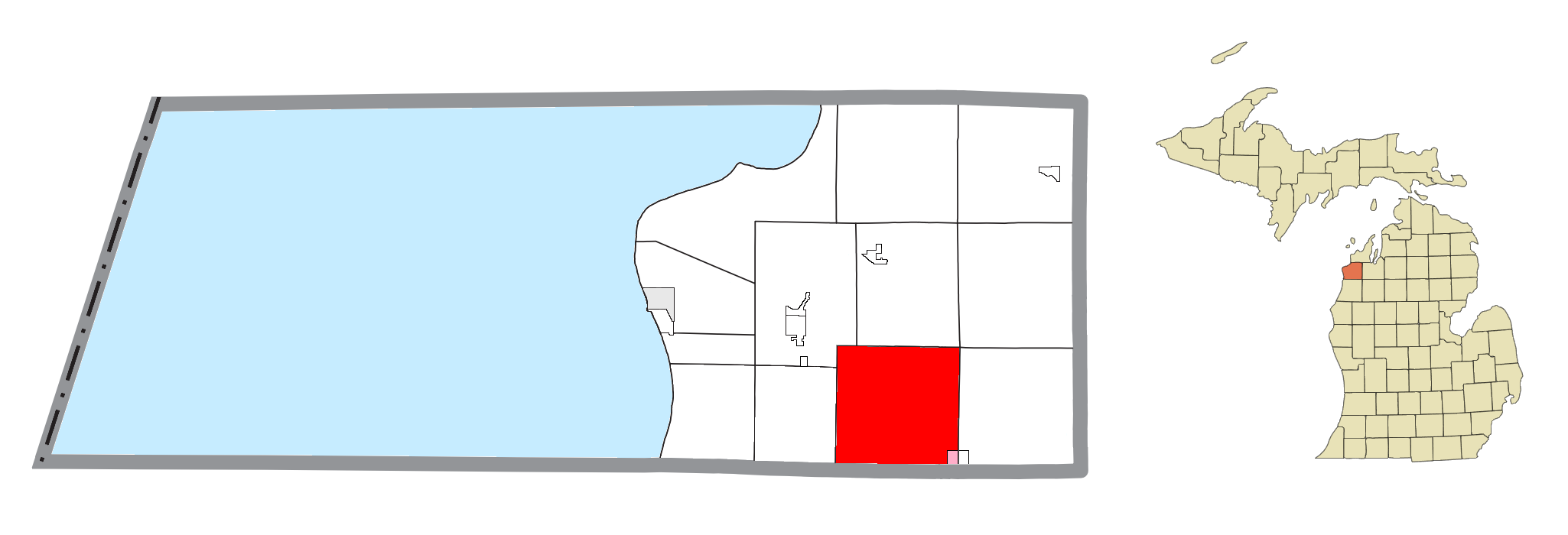
- Location within Benzie County (red) and an administered portion of the Thompsonville village (pink)

- Location within the state of Michigan Weldon Township (the United States)
- Coordinates: 44°32′59″N 85°59′20″W
- Country: United States
- State: Michigan
- County: Benzie

Area
  - Total: 36.6 sq mi (94.9 km^{2})
  - Land: 36.4 sq mi (94.4 km^{2})
  - Water: 0.19 sq mi (0.5 km^{2})
- Elevation: 797 ft (243 m)

Population (2020)
  - Total: 579
  - Density: 15.9/sq mi (6.13/km^{2})
- Time zone: UTC-5 (Eastern (EST))
  - Summer (DST): UTC-4 (EDT)
- ZIP code(s): 49616, 49617, 49683
- Area code: 231
- FIPS code: 26-85160
- GNIS feature ID: 1627239
- Website: Official website

Weldon Township is a civil township of Benzie County in the U.S. state of Michigan. The population was 579 at the 2020 census. The township is in the south central portion of the county. One half of the village of Thompsonville is located in the township, as well as the entire census-designated place of Crystal Mountain, containing the Crystal Mountain Resort, is in the southern part of the township.

== Geography ==
According to the United States Census Bureau, the township has a total area of 36.6 square miles (94.9 km^{2}), of which 36.4 square miles (94.4 km^{2}) is land and 0.19 square miles (0.5 km^{2}), or 0.55%, is water.

== Demographics ==
Historical population
Census	Pop.	Note	%±
2000	530		—
2010	542		2.3%
2020	579		6.8%

As of the census of 2000, there were 530 people, 217 households, and 149 families residing in the township. The population density was 14.5 per square mile (5.6/km^{2}). There were 483 housing units at an average density of 13.2 per square mile (5.1/km^{2}). The racial makeup of the township was 95.85% White, 2.45% Native American, 1.13% from other races, and 0.57% from two or more races. Hispanic or Latino of any race were 1.70% of the population.

There were 217 households, out of which 25.3% had children under the age of 18 living with them, 53.9% were married couples living together, 10.6% had a female householder with no husband present, and 30.9% were non-families. 24.9% of all households were made up of individuals, and 11.5% had someone living alone who was 65 years of age or older. The average household size was 2.44 and the average family size was 2.87.

In the township the population was spread out, with 22.5% under the age of 18, 7.9% from 18 to 24, 24.5% from 25 to 44, 28.3% from 45 to 64, and 16.8% who were 65 years of age or older. The median age was 42 years. For every 100 females, there were 97.0 males. For every 100 females age 18 and over, there were 95.7 males.

The median income for a household in the township was $33,125, and the median income for a family was $37,917. Males had a median income of $29,688 versus $21,339 for females. The per capita income for the township was $17,725. About 8.9% of families and 12.6% of the population were below the poverty line, including 25.2% of those under age 18 and 8.1% of those age 65 or over.
