= Benzonia Township, Michigan =

- Civil township
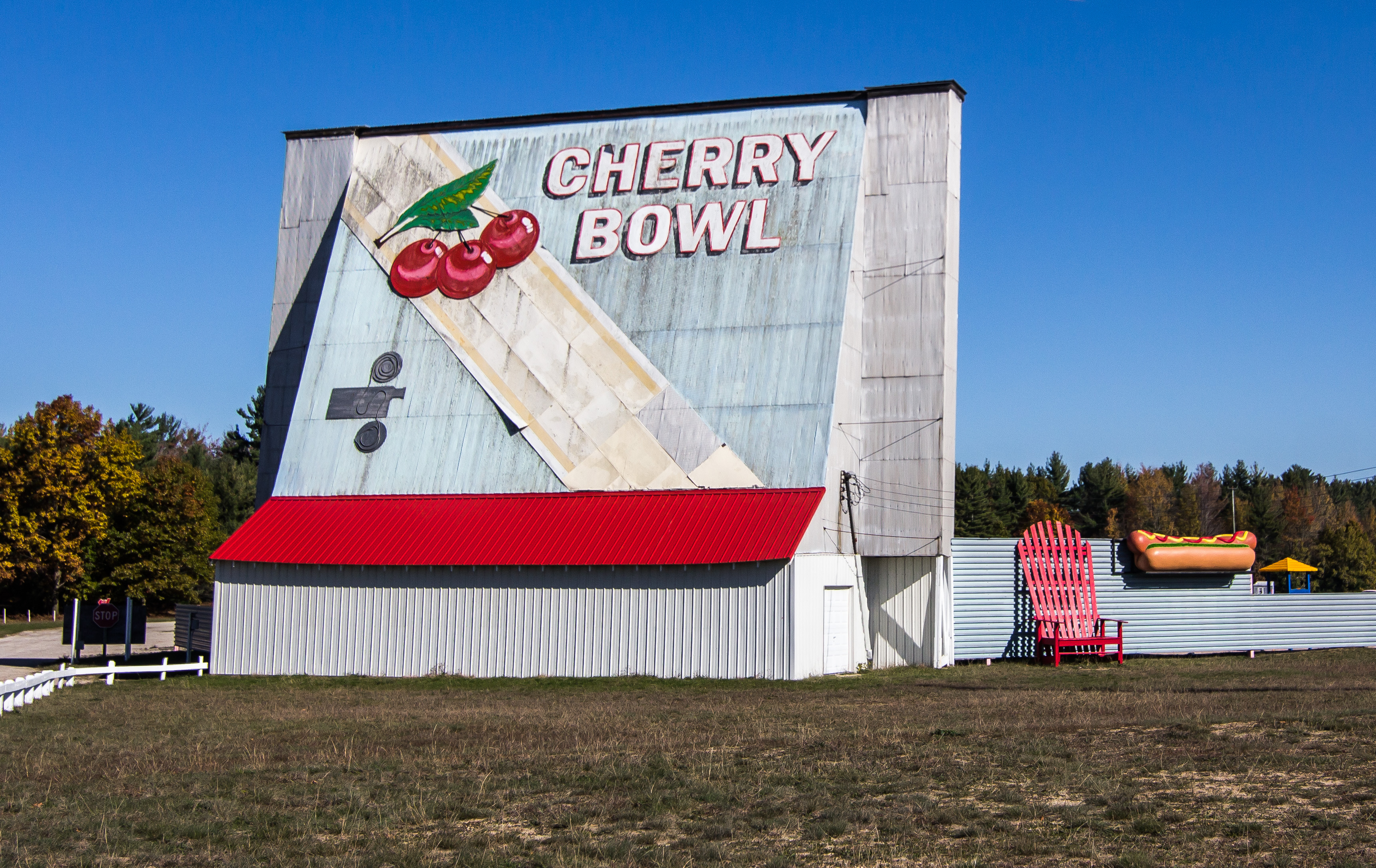
- The Cherry Bowl Drive-In Theatre & Diner

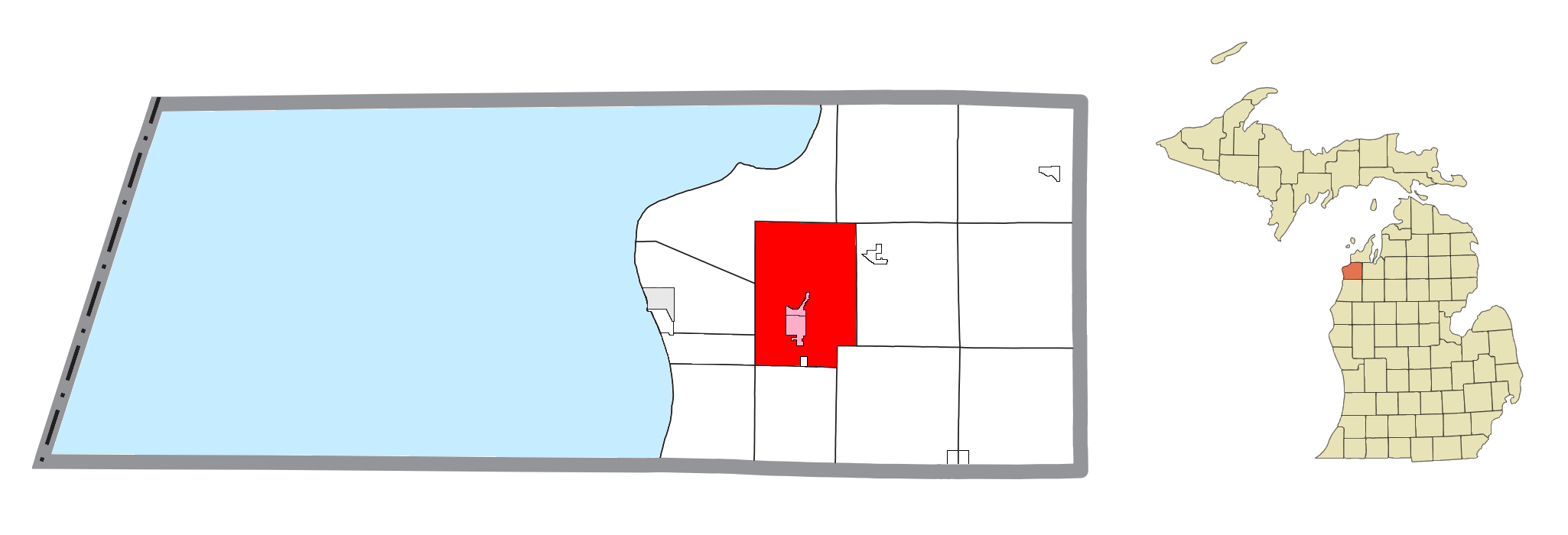
- Location within Benzie County (red) and the administered villages of Benzonia and Beulah (pink)

- Location within the state of Michigan Benzonia Township (the United States)
- Coordinates: 44°38′06″N 86°05′27″W
- Country: United States
- State: Michigan
- County: Benzie
- Organized: 1861

Government
  - Supervisor: Jason Barnard

Area
  - Total: 33.9 sq mi (87.7 km^{2})
  - Land: 27.8 sq mi (72.0 km^{2})
  - Water: 6.1 sq mi (15.7 km^{2})
- Elevation: 607 ft (185 m)

Population (2020)
  - Total: 2,734
  - Density: 81/sq mi (31.2/km^{2})
- Time zone: UTC-5 (Eastern (EST))
  - Summer (DST): UTC-4 (EDT)
- ZIP code(s): 49616
- Area code: 231
- FIPS code: 26-07600
- GNIS feature ID: 1625920
- Website: Official website

Benzonia Township (/bɛnˈzoʊniə/ ben-ZOH-nee-ə) is a civil township of Benzie County in the U.S. state of Michigan. As of the 2020 census, the township population was 2,734.

== History ==
Benzonia Township was organized in 1861.

== Geography ==
Benzonia Township is situated west of the center of Benzie County. The southeastern third of Crystal Lake occupies the central to western part of the township, and the southern half of Platte Lake is in the northern part of the township. The Betsie and Platte rivers flow through the township, both from east to west, toward Lake Michigan.

According to the United States Census Bureau, the township has a total area of 33.9 square miles (87.7 km^{2}), of which 27.8 square miles (72.0 km^{2}) is land and 6.1 square miles (15.7 km^{2}), or 17.87%, is water.

=== Major highways ===
- US 31 enters the township from the south and exits the township to the east. Motorists can use southbound US 31 to access Manistee and south, and eastbound US 31 to access Traverse City and north.
- M-115 enters the township from the south with US 31, however, exits the township to the west. It ends at a junction with M-22 in nearby Frankfort. Southeast of Benzonia Township, M-115 runs through Cadillac to Clare.

== Communities ==
- Benzonia is a village immediately south of Beulah. It is the location of a junction between highways US 31 and M-115.
- Beulah is the county seat of Benzie County. A small village, it is located upon the eastern shore of Crystal Lake.

== Demographics ==
As of the census of 2000, there were 2,839 people, 1,205 households, and 789 families residing in the township. The population density was 100.4 inhabitants per square mile (38.8/km^{2}). There were 2,024 housing units at an average density of 71.6 per square mile (27.6/km^{2}). The racial makeup of the township was 96.23% White, 0.14% African American, 2.18% Native American, 0.25% Asian, 0.04% Pacific Islander, 0.53% from other races, and 0.63% from two or more races. Hispanic or Latino of any race were 1.66% of the population.

There were 1,205 households, out of which 24.1% had children under the age of 18 living with them, 54.9% were married couples living together, 7.6% had a female householder with no husband present, and 34.5% were non-families. 28.7% of all households were made up of individuals, and 15.9% had someone living alone who was 65 years of age or older. The average household size was 2.25 and the average family size was 2.76.

In the township, the population was spread out, with 20.1% under the age of 18, 5.8% from 18 to 24, 23.3% from 25 to 44, 28.0% from 45 to 64, and 22.8% who were 65 years of age or older. The median age was 46 years. For every 100 females, there were 97.2 males. For every 100 females age 18 and over, there were 95.4 males.

The median income for a household in the township was $32,837, and the median income for a family was $40,786. Males had a median income of $29,667 versus $21,915 for females. The per capita income for the township was $18,720. About 2.9% of families and 7.0% of the population were below the poverty line, including 4.4% of those under age 18 and 7.2% of those age 65 or over.
