= Benzonia, Michigan =

- Village
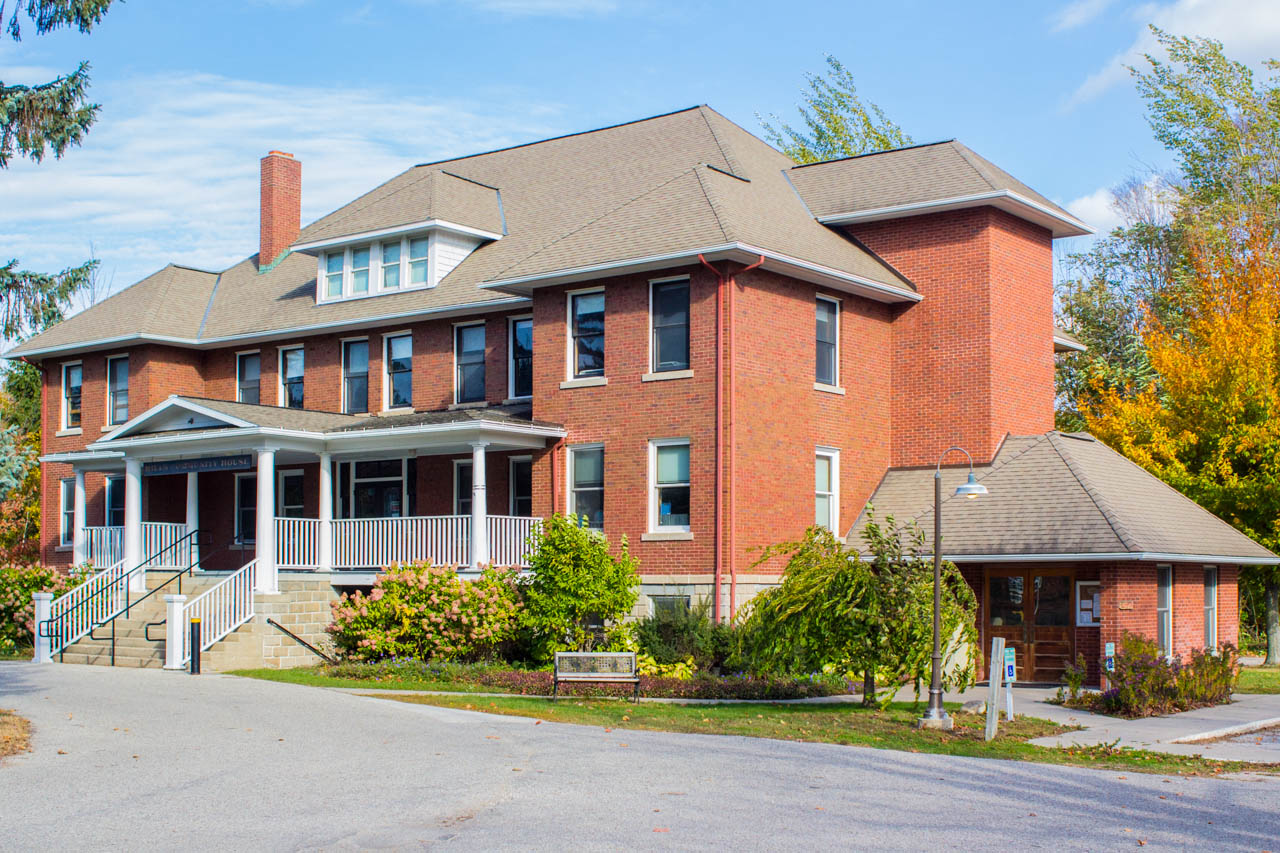
- The Mills Community House in Benzonia

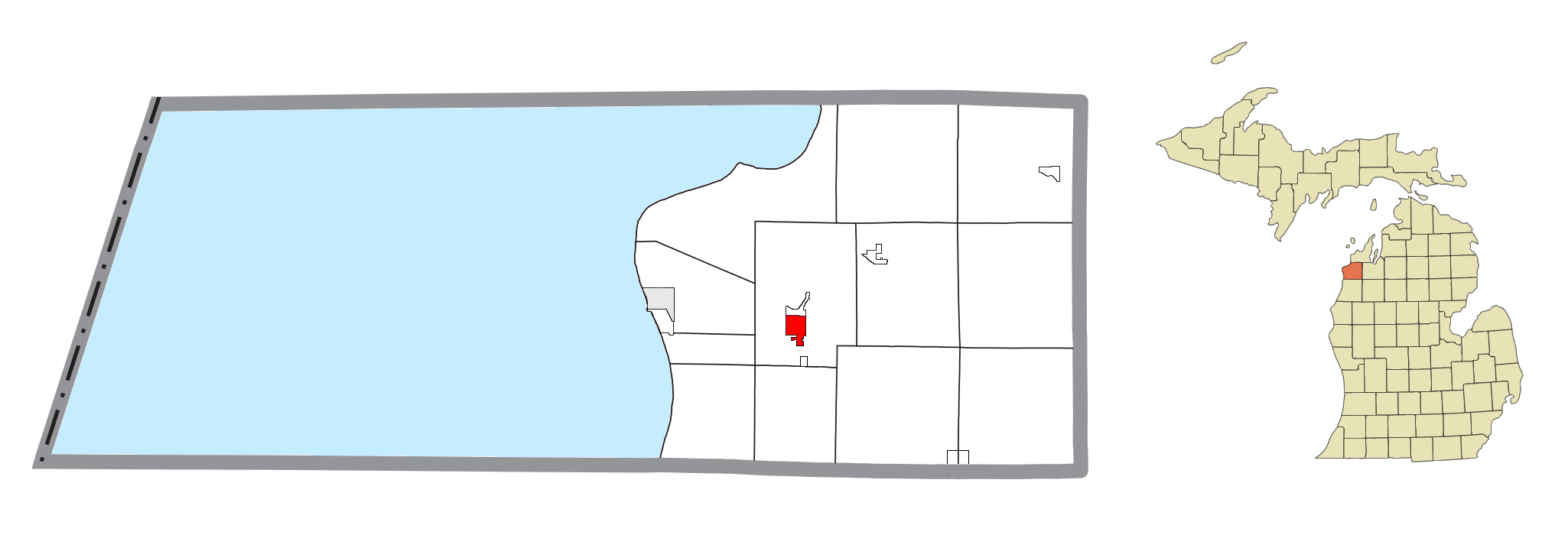
- Location within Benzie County

- Location within the state of Michigan
- Coordinates: 44°36′57″N 86°05′57″W
- Country: United States
- State: Michigan
- County: Benzie
- Township: Benzonia
- Established: 1858

Area
  - Total: 1.13 sq mi (2.93 km^{2})
  - Land: 1.13 sq mi (2.93 km^{2})
  - Water: 0 sq mi (0.00 km^{2})
- Elevation: 817 ft (249 m)

Population (2020)
  - Total: 551
  - Density: 487.2/sq mi (188.09/km^{2})
- Time zone: UTC-5 (Eastern (EST))
  - Summer (DST): UTC-4 (EDT)
- ZIP code(s): 49616
- Area code: 231
- FIPS code: 26-07580
- GNIS feature ID: 2398099
- Website: https://www.villagebenzonia.com/

Benzonia (/bɛnˈzoʊniə/ ben-ZOH-nee-ə) is a village in Benzie County in the U.S. state of Michigan. The population was 551 at the 2020 census, up from 497 at the 2010 census. The village is located within Benzonia Township at the southeast end of Crystal Lake on U.S. Highway 31 at the junction with M-115 west.

== Geography ==
According to the United States Census Bureau, the village has a total area of 1.13 square miles (2.93 km^{2}), all land.

== History ==
Benzonia began in 1858 as an educational Christian colony on the model of Oberlin, Ohio. Its founding was under the leadership of Charles E. Bailey. The village, which was once the county seat, was incorporated in 1891.

In 1863 Grand Traverse College was chartered and began here. It was renamed Benzonia College in 1891. In 1900 the college was changed to a preparatory school named Benzonia Academy. The academy continued to function until 1918 when it was closed. In his book Waiting for the Morning Train, historian Bruce Catton captured local history and documented his perspective of growing up in Benzonia as his father was an instructor at the academy.

== Demographics ==
Historical population
Census	Pop.	Note	%±
1900	484		—
1910	563		16.3%
1920	543		−3.6%
1930	623		14.7%
1940	340		−45.4%
1950	407		19.7%
1960	407		0.0%
1970	412		1.2%
1980	466		13.1%
1990	449		−3.6%
2000	519		15.6%
2010	497		−4.2%
2020	551		10.9%
U.S. Decennial Census

=== 2010 census ===
As of the census of 2010, there were 497 people, 209 households, and 125 families living in the village. The population density was 439.8 inhabitants per square mile (169.8/km^{2}). There were 275 housing units at an average density of 243.4 per square mile (94.0/km^{2}). The racial makeup of the village was 93.2% White, 1.2% African American, 0.4% Native American, 2.4% from other races, and 2.8% from two or more races. Hispanic or Latino of any race were 6.2% of the population.

There were 209 households, of which 28.7% had children under the age of 18 living with them, 35.9% were married couples living together, 19.1% had a female householder with no husband present, 4.8% had a male householder with no wife present, and 40.2% were non-families. 34.4% of all households were made up of individuals, and 11.5% had someone living alone who was 65 years of age or older. The average household size was 2.38 and the average family size was 3.04.

The median age in the village was 39.9 years. 25.6% of residents were under the age of 18; 8.3% were between the ages of 18 and 24; 21.2% were from 25 to 44; 26.1% were from 45 to 64; and 18.5% were 65 years of age or older. The gender makeup of the village was 45.1% male and 54.9% female.

=== 2000 census ===
As of the census of 2000, there were 519 people, 211 households, and 128 families living in the village. The population density was 488.2 inhabitants per square mile (188.5/km^{2}). There were 254 housing units at an average density of 238.9 per square mile (92.2/km^{2}). The racial makeup of the village was 93.45% White, 0.39% African American, 3.08% Native American, 0.39% Asian, 0.19% Pacific Islander, 0.96% from other races, and 1.54% from two or more races. Hispanic or Latino of any race were 2.89% of the population.

There were 211 households, out of which 25.6% had children under the age of 18 living with them, 44.5% were married couples living together, 12.3% had a female householder with no husband present, and 39.3% were non-families. 33.2% of all households were made up of individuals, and 19.9% had someone living alone who was 65 years of age or older. The average household size was 2.25 and the average family size was 2.88.

In the village, the population was spread out, with 21.0% under the age of 18, 10.4% from 18 to 24, 25.6% from 25 to 44, 22.4% from 45 to 64, and 20.6% who were 65 years of age or older. The median age was 40 years. For every 100 females, there were 100.4 males. For every 100 females age 18 and over, there were 106.0 males.

The median income for a household in the village was $28,650, and the median income for a family was $35,104. Males had a median income of $25,469 versus $20,313 for females. The per capita income for the village was $15,515. About 5.0% of families and 10.1% of the population were below the poverty line, including 4.6% of those under age 18 and 15.6% of those age 65 or over.

== Notable people ==
- Bruce Catton, American Civil War historian
- Jennie W. Erickson, probation officer and school superintendent
- Gwen Frostic, artist, author, Michigan Women's Hall of Fame inductee
- Douglass North, economic historian and Nobel laureate
