= Thompsonville, Michigan =

- Village
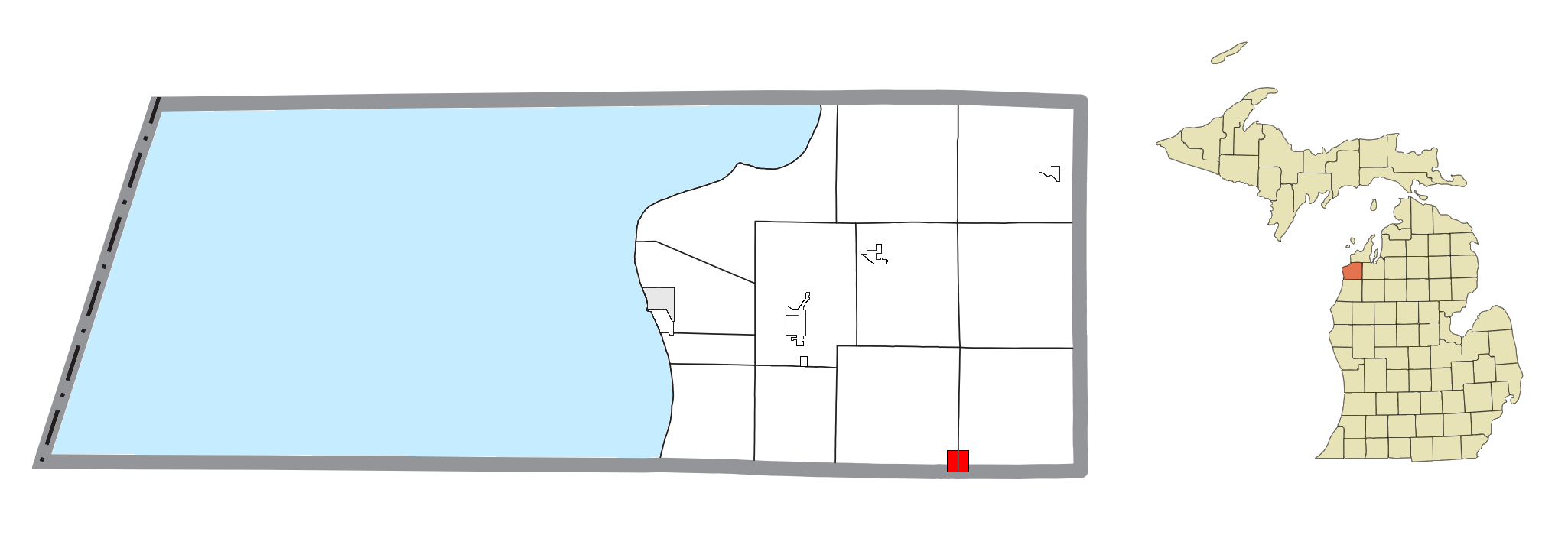
- Location within Benzie County

- Location within the state of Michigan
- Coordinates: 44°31′13″N 85°56′30″W
- Country: United States
- State: Michigan
- County: Benzie
- Townships: Colfax and Weldon

Area
  - Total: 1.00 sq mi (2.58 km^{2})
  - Land: 1.00 sq mi (2.58 km^{2})
  - Water: 0 sq mi (0.00 km^{2})
- Elevation: 794 ft (242 m)

Population (2020)
  - Total: 451
  - Density: 452.9/sq mi (174.88/km^{2})
- Time zone: UTC-5 (Eastern (EST))
  - Summer (DST): UTC-4 (EDT)
- ZIP code(s): 49683
- Area code: 231
- FIPS code: 26-79600
- GNIS feature ID: 1614783

Thompsonville is a village in Benzie County in the U.S. state of Michigan. The village had a population of 451 at the 2020 census, up from 441 at the 2010 census. The village lies immediately north of the Manistee County line, and is divided between Colfax and Weldon townships.

Crystal Mountain, one of Michigan's largest ski resorts, is located just west of Thompsonville.

== Geography ==
According to the United States Census Bureau, the village has a total area of 1.00 square mile (2.59 km^{2}), all land.

== Origin ==
Thompsonville was established when construction of the lines of two railroads, the Chicago & West Michigan and the Frankfort & South Eastern, crossed here in 1889. The village, originally called Lyndonville, was platted on July 23, 1890, and was named for Sumner S. Thompson,(4/12/1823-10/24/1889), who was the President of the Frankfort and South Eastern Railroad at the time of his death. Of the two railroads serving the village, the Chicago & West Michigan was merged into the Pere Marquette Railway in 1900 and the Chesapeake & Ohio Railway in 1947, while the Frankfort & South Eastern was acquired in 1892 by the Toledo, Ann Arbor & North Michigan, which in turn was reorganized in 1895 as the Ann Arbor Railroad.

== Points of interest ==
- Thompsonville is best known for the ski resort located there, Crystal Mountain.
- The junction between the two railroadsAA Railroad and C&O Railway is known locally as the "Diamond Crossing". In 1982, C&O Railway made its last train through Thompsonville before the closure. 9 Years later in 1991, Tuscola and Saginaw Bay Railway train was the last train through Thompsonville. When the railbeds were razed, the "Diamond Crossing" was saved from the dismantling of the railroad tracks and moved. It can be seen with Caboose on tracks adjacent to the George W. Sharp Park.
- A Michigan Historical Commission Historical Marker #2335 was registered in the fall of 2020 and is situated near the site of the Diamond Crossing.

== Demographics ==
Historical population
| Census | Pop. | Note | %± |
|---|---|---|---|
| 1900 | 893 | | — |
| 1910 | 815 | | −8.7% |
| 1920 | 410 | | −49.7% |
| 1930 | 295 | | −28.0% |
| 1940 | 324 | | 9.8% |
| 1950 | 313 | | −3.4% |
| 1960 | 243 | | −22.4% |
| 1970 | 312 | | 28.4% |
| 1980 | 331 | | 6.1% |
| 1990 | 416 | | 25.7% |
| 2000 | 457 | | 9.9% |
| 2010 | 441 | | −3.5% |
| 2020 | 451 | | 2.3% |
U.S. Decennial Census

=== 2010 census ===
As of the census of 2010, there were 441 people, 183 households, and 112 families living in the village. The population density was 441.0 inhabitants per square mile (170.3/km^{2}). There were 245 housing units at an average density of 245.0 per square mile (94.6/km^{2}). The racial makeup of the village was 94.8% White, 0.2% African American, 2.5% Native American, 0.2% Asian, 0.2% from other races, and 2.0% from two or more races. Hispanic or Latino of any race were 1.4% of the population.

There were 183 households, of which 28.4% had children under the age of 18 living with them, 37.2% were married couples living together, 16.4% had a female householder with no husband present, 7.7% had a male householder with no wife present, and 38.8% were non-families. 30.6% of all households were made up of individuals, and 12.6% had someone living alone who was 65 years of age or older. The average household size was 2.41 and the average family size was 2.99.

The median age in the village was 38.5 years. 23.1% of residents were under the age of 18; 9.1% were between the ages of 18 and 24; 28.1% were from 25 to 44; 24% were from 45 to 64; and 15.6% were 65 years of age or older. The gender makeup of the village was 49.9% male and 50.1% female.

=== 2000 census ===
As of the census of 2000, there were 457 people, 180 households, and 120 families living in the village. The population density was 454.5 inhabitants per square mile (175.5/km^{2}). There were 221 housing units at an average density of 219.8 per square mile (84.9/km^{2}). The racial makeup of the village was 96.06% White, 2.41% Native American, 0.22% Asian, 1.09% from other races, and 0.22% from two or more races. Hispanic or Latino of any race were 0.22% of the population.

There were 180 households, out of which 34.4% had children under the age of 18 living with them, 47.2% were married couples living together, 13.9% had a female householder with no husband present, and 33.3% were non-families. 28.9% of all households were made up of individuals, and 15.0% had someone living alone who was 65 years of age or older. The average household size was 2.54 and the average family size was 3.12.

In the village, the population was spread out, with 28.4% under the age of 18, 8.3% from 18 to 24, 27.6% from 25 to 44, 21.4% from 45 to 64, and 14.2% who were 65 years of age or older. The median age was 35 years. For every 100 females, there were 101.3 males. For every 100 females age 18 and over, there were 99.4 males.

The median income for a household in the village was $29,125, and the median income for a family was $31,103. Males had a median income of $22,500 versus $18,250 for females. The per capita income for the village was $12,104. About 12.8% of families and 13.3% of the population were below the poverty line, including 24.3% of those under age 18 and 7.1% of those age 65 or over.

== Climate ==
This climatic region has large seasonal temperature differences, with warm to hot (and often humid) summers and cold (sometimes severely cold) winters. According to the Köppen Climate Classification system, Thompsonville has a humid continental climate, abbreviated "Dfb" on climate maps.

Climate data for Thompsonville, Michigan
| Month | Jan | Feb | Mar | Apr | May | Jun | Jul | Aug | Sep | Oct | Nov | Dec | Year |
|---|---|---|---|---|---|---|---|---|---|---|---|---|---|
| Mean daily maximum °C (°F) | −6 (22) | −4 (24) | 1 (34) | 9 (48) | 17 (62) | 22 (71) | 25 (77) | 24 (75) | 19 (66) | 12 (54) | 4 (39) | −2 (28) | 10 (50) |
| Mean daily minimum °C (°F) | −15 (5) | −16 (4) | −11 (12) | −4 (25) | 3 (37) | 7 (44) | 10 (50) | 9 (49) | 6 (42) | 1 (33) | −5 (23) | −11 (12) | −2 (28) |
| Average precipitation mm (inches) | 89 (3.5) | 46 (1.8) | 56 (2.2) | 56 (2.2) | 71 (2.8) | 81 (3.2) | 81 (3.2) | 91 (3.6) | 97 (3.8) | 89 (3.5) | 76 (3.0) | 76 (3.0) | 909 (35.8) |
Source: Weatherbase
