= National Cherry Festival =

Annual food festival in Traverse City, Michigan, U.S.

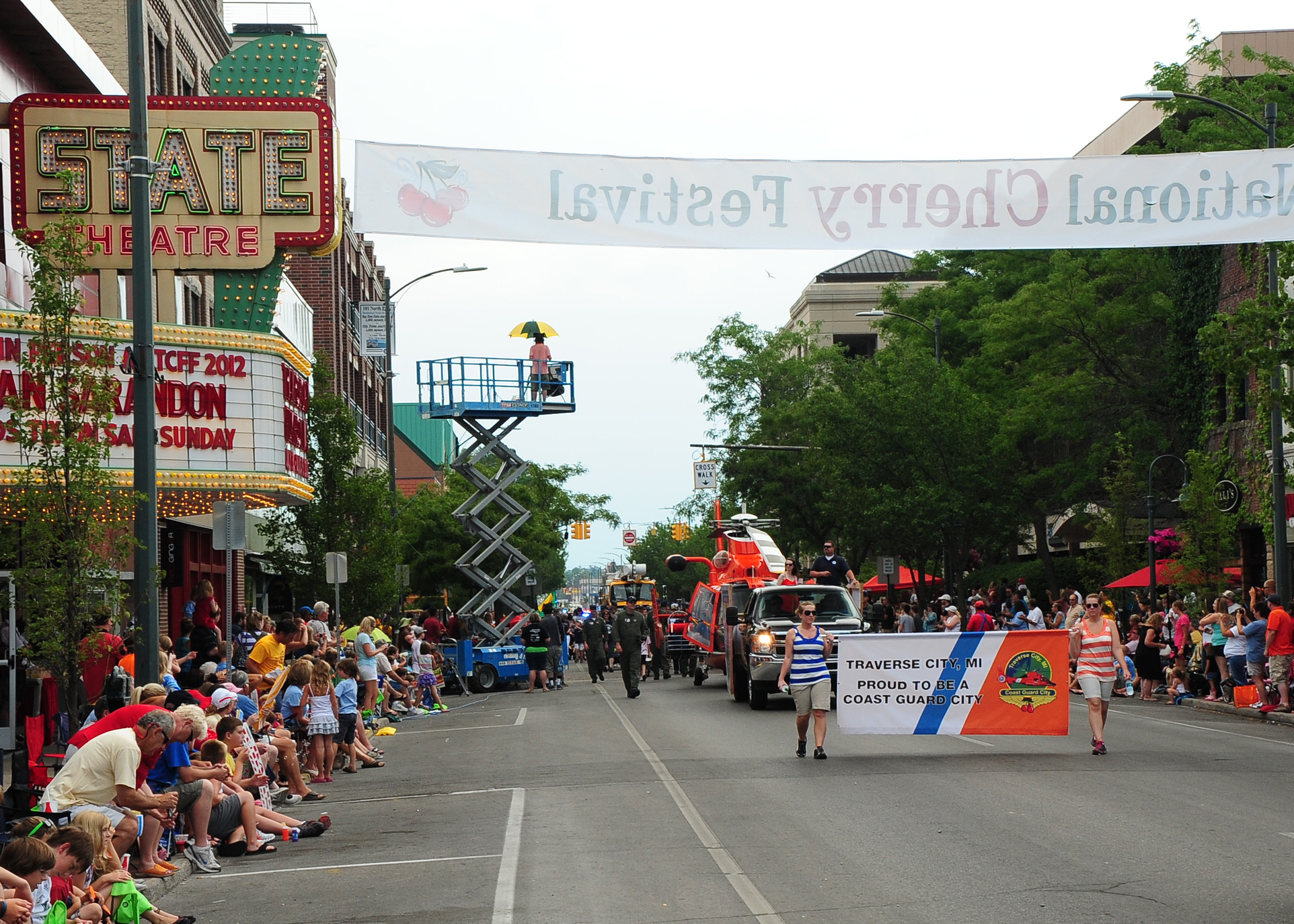
- National Cherry Festival parade on East Front Street in 2012
- Begins: July 3, 2027
- Ends: July 10, 2027
- Frequency: Annual
- Venue: Open Space Park; Downtown Traverse City
- Locations: Traverse City, Michigan
- Coordinates: 44°45′56″N 85°37′25″W
- Country: United States
- Years active: 1925–1941, 1948–2019, 2021–present
- Inaugurated: May 22, 1925; 101 years ago
- Attendance: >500,000
- Website: www.cherryfestival.org

The National Cherry Festival is a food festival held annually in Traverse City, Michigan, United States. The eight-day festival celebrates cherry production in the Grand Traverse Bay region of Northwest Michigan, surrounding Traverse City, which is nicknamed the "Cherry Capital of the World".

The festival was inaugurated in 1925 as the "Blessing of the Blossoms Festival". Since being renamed to the National Cherry Festival by the Michigan Legislature in 1931, the festival has been held nearly every year since, with cancellations from 1942 to 1947 and in 2020.

== History ==
=== Traverse City cherries ===
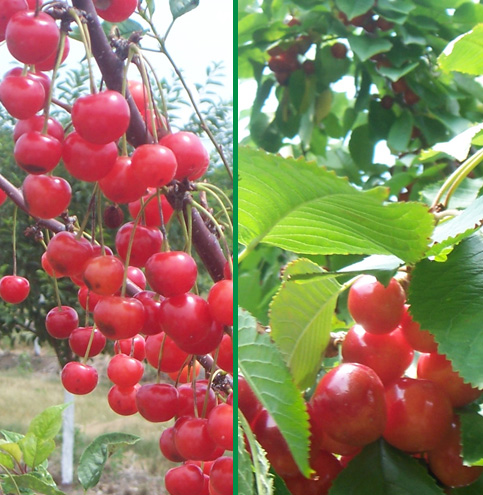
Tart (left) and sweet (right) cherries grown in Acme Township, just east of Traverse City.

In 1839, the Reverend Peter Dougherty, a Presbyterian missionary, established a Native American mission at present-day Old Mission, near the tip of the Old Mission Peninsula. In 1852, Dougherty planted the first cherry trees, which flourished, much to the surprise of locals, who began to plant trees themselves. The first commercial cherry orchard was established in 1893. By the beginning of the 20th century, much of the Lake Michigan shoreline, especially the area surrounding Traverse City, was the center of a well-established cherry-growing industry.

=== Festival history ===
The very first festival was held in May 1925, and was known as the Blessing of the Blossoms. The first cherry queen was Gertrude Brown. In 1931, the Michigan Legislature renamed the festival to the National Cherry Festival, and moved to July. The festival was cancelled from 1942 to 1946 due to World War II, and again in 1947, as Traverse City instead celebrated its centennial. In 1964, the festival was extended from three days to five, and in 1968, was extended to eight days. In 1975, President Gerald Ford, a Michigan native, attended the festival, and led the Cherry Royale Parade as Grand Marshal.

On July 25, 1987, Cherry Festival participants earned a place in the Guinness Book of World Records for baking the world's largest cherry pie. The pie was 17 ft 6 in (5.33 m) in diameter, weighing 28,350 pounds (12,860 kilograms). This replaced the pie baked nine years earlier in Charlevoix, Michigan. This record was held until July 14, 1990, when a pie weighing 37,740 lb 10 oz (17,118.9 kg), 20 feet (6.1 m) in diameter was baked and eaten by approximately 1,500 people in Oliver, British Columbia, Canada.

On April 16, 2020, that the festival was to be postponed until the following year, as a result of the COVID-19 pandemic. The festival resumed in 2021.

In 2021, the festival garnered national attention when on July 8, a Magic Carpet ride at the festival's midway malfunctioned and began to lean and sway. Bystanders rushed to the ride and held it down by its guardrails until the ride came to a stop. No serious injuries were reported, and shortly after, the ride was dismantled.

The 100th National Cherry Festival was celebrated in 2026. The festival's start date, July 4, coincided with the United States Semiquincentennial.

== Activities and traditions ==
=== National Cherry Queen and Junior Royalty ===
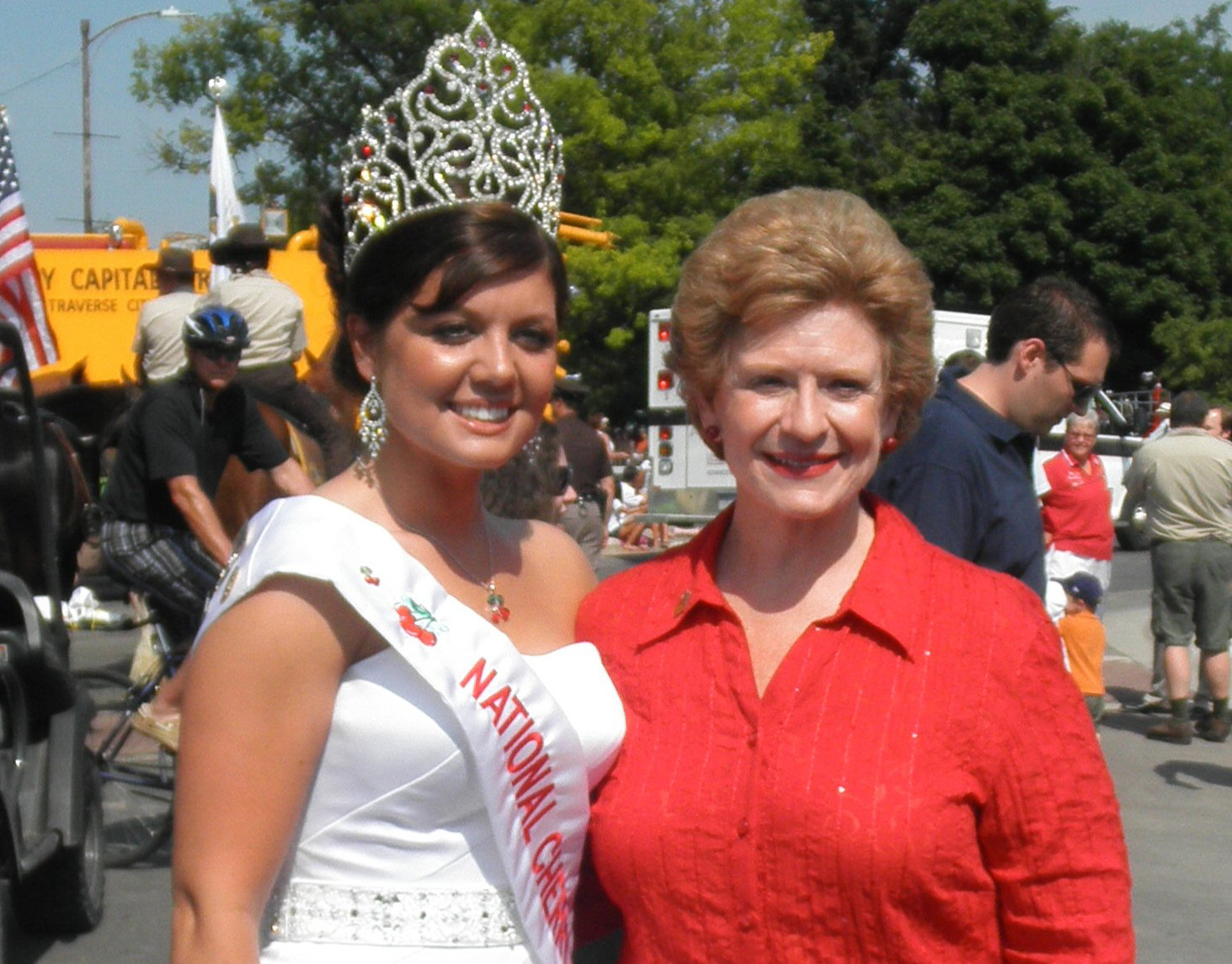
The 2011-12 National Cherry Queen, Jordan Blaker (left), with U.S. Senator Debbie Stabenow.

Each year, the National Cherry Festival selects a local young woman to serve as the National Cherry Queen, who serves as an ambassador of the Michigan cherry industry, often travelling throughout the state and country, attending promotional events, and making television appearances. The National Cherry Queen program began in 1925, with Gertrude Brown serving as the first queen. The current National Cherry Queen for 2026-27 is Magdalen Kleinrichert.

Additionally, the Junior Royalty program selects one prince and one princess each from over 25 local elementary schools. Each prince and princess represents their respective schools on a float in the National Cherry Festival parades.

=== Parades ===
The National Cherry Festival features two parades: the Consumers Energy Community Royale Parade and the DTE Energy Foundation Cherry Royale Parade. Both parades begin at the corner of East Front Street and Franklin Street, and begin procession westerly for five blocks down East Front Street. The parades then turn south along South Union Street. The Consumers Energy Community Royale Parade continues for three blocks, terminating at Seventh Street near Central Grade School, while the DTE Energy Foundation Cherry Royale Parade continues for nine blocks, terminating at Thirteenth Street near Thirlby Field.

=== Air show ===
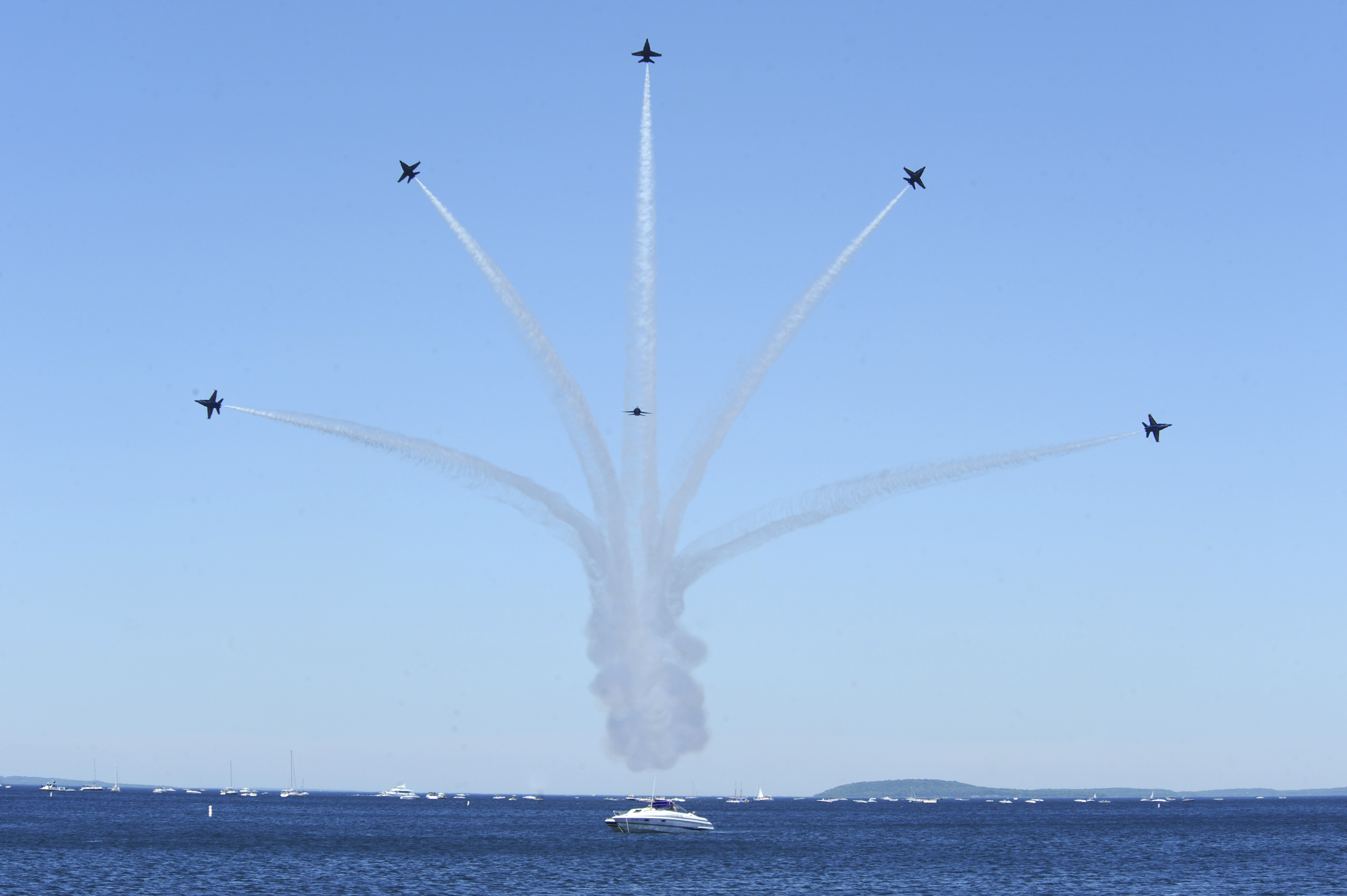
The Blue Angels performing over West Grand Traverse Bay in 2010. Each festival features an air show, rotating each year between the Blue Angels and USAF Thunderbirds.

The National Cherry Festival hosts an air show over West Grand Traverse Bay. At no cost to the public, the air show includes, but is not limited to, the United States Navy Blue Angels, A-10C Thunderbolt II Demo Team, the United States Coast Guard Air Station Traverse City, and the Michigan Army National Guard. The United States Coast Guard Air Station Traverse City also offers an opportunity to meet the pilots and see the aircraft that are flown. The air show is broadcast live on 107.5 WCCW.

=== Meijer Festival of Races ===
The Meijer Festival of Races is a series of competitive and recreational road races. Held on the festival's closing Saturday, the event includes a 5K, 10K, 15K, and half marathon. These races showcase the scenery of the Old Mission Peninsula and downtown Traverse City.

=== Midway ===
The National Cherry Festival Midway, operated by Arnold Amusements, is a traveling carnival in operation for the duration of each festival. The Midway is located in parking lots B & T, south of Grandview Parkway between North Union and North Cass streets.

=== Other activities ===
The festival also has a marching band, known as the Second Time Arounders that the public can join as long as they know a marching band instrument. The band has five rehearsals and three performance days that happen in late June and early July. The festival also hosts a number of concerts at Open Space Park.

The National Cherry Festival gives awards to a variety of people based on their contributions to the cherry industry, called Very Cherry Awards. The Cherry Industry Person/Couple Award recognizes those who've made substantial contributions to the cherry industry through leadership. The Lifetime Achievement Award recognizes those who have spent many years in the cherry farming industry and related fields. The Very Cherry Promotion Award recognizes businesses and individuals who heavily promote the cherry industry as a whole.

Other activities and traditions hosted annually by the festival include:

- A series of concerts at a temporary venue, the Pepsi Bayside Music Stage, in Open Space Park
- A powwow held by the Grand Traverse Band of Ottawa and Chippewa Indians
- Ultimate Air Dogs, a dock jumping competition
- Pie eating contests for both adults and children
- Pit spitting contests for both adults and children
- Two fireworks shows, organized by the Traverse City Boom Boom Club; one on the 4th of July, and one on the final night of the festival.
- A bed race
- A milk carton boat regatta

== See also ==
- Cherry production in Michigan
  - Cherry production in the United States
- Food festival
- Michigan wine
- History of Northern Michigan
