= Maple Grove, Benzie County, Michigan =

Maple Grove, Michigan
- Census-designated place (CDP) & unincorporated community
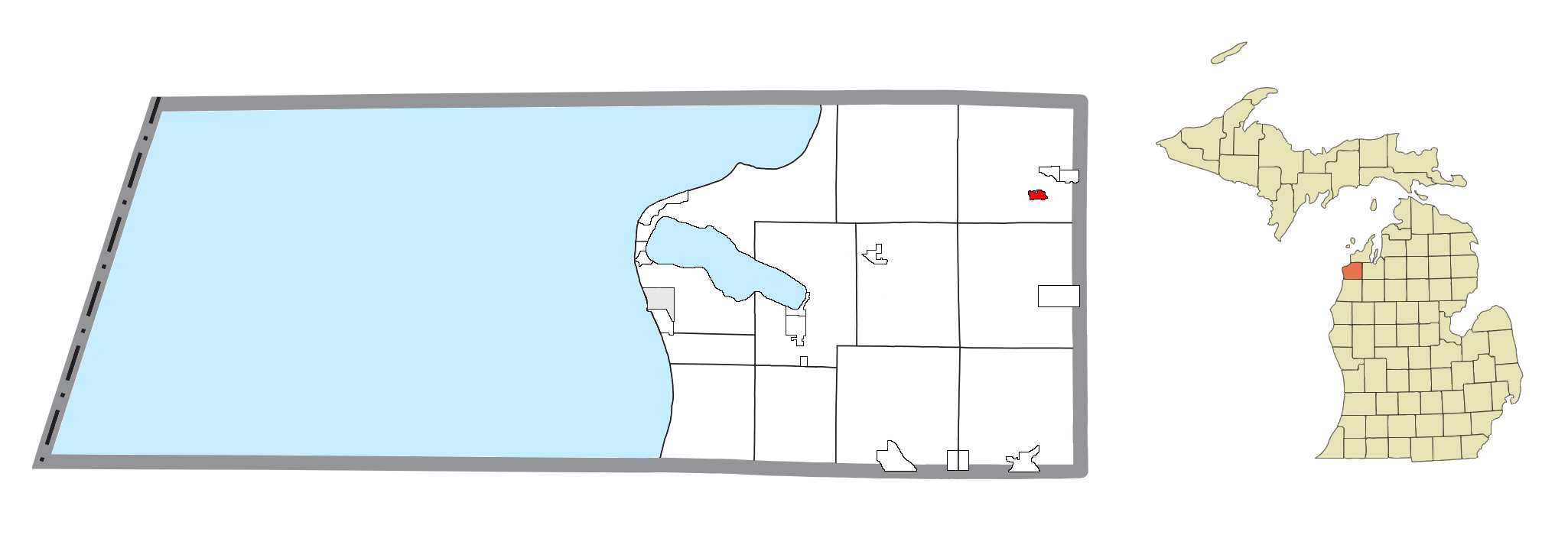
- Location within Benzie County

- Location within the state of Michigan Maple Grove (the United States)
- Coordinates: 44°42′30″N 85°51′12″W
- Country: United States
- State: Michigan
- County: Benzie
- Township: Almira

Area
  - Total: 0.35 sq mi (0.91 km^{2})
  - Land: 0.35 sq mi (0.91 km^{2})
  - Water: 0 sq mi (0.00 km^{2})
- Elevation: 820 ft (250 m)

Population (2020)
  - Total: 139
  - Density: 396.4/sq mi (153.06/km^{2})
- Time zone: UTC-5 (Eastern (EST))
  - Summer (DST): UTC-4 (EDT)
- ZIP code(s): 49617 (Beulah)
- Area code: 231
- FIPS code: 26-50970
- GNIS feature ID: 2583753

Maple Grove is an unincorporated community and census-designated place in Benzie County in the U.S. state of Michigan. The population was 139 at the 2020 census. Maple Grove is located within Almira Township.

== Geography ==
Maple Grove is located in southeastern Almira Township in northeastern Benzie County. The CDP is located on the south shore of Lake Ann just south of the village of Lake Ann.

According to the United States Census Bureau, the CDP has a total area of 0.35 square miles (0.9 km^{2}), all land.

== History ==
The community of Maple Grove was listed as a newly-organized census-designated place for the 2010 census, meaning it now has officially defined boundaries and population statistics for the first time.

== Demographics ==
Historical population
Census	Pop.	Note	%±
2010	132		—
2020	139		5.3%
U.S. Decennial Census
