= Hardwood Acres, Michigan =

- Census-designated place (CDP) & unincorporated community
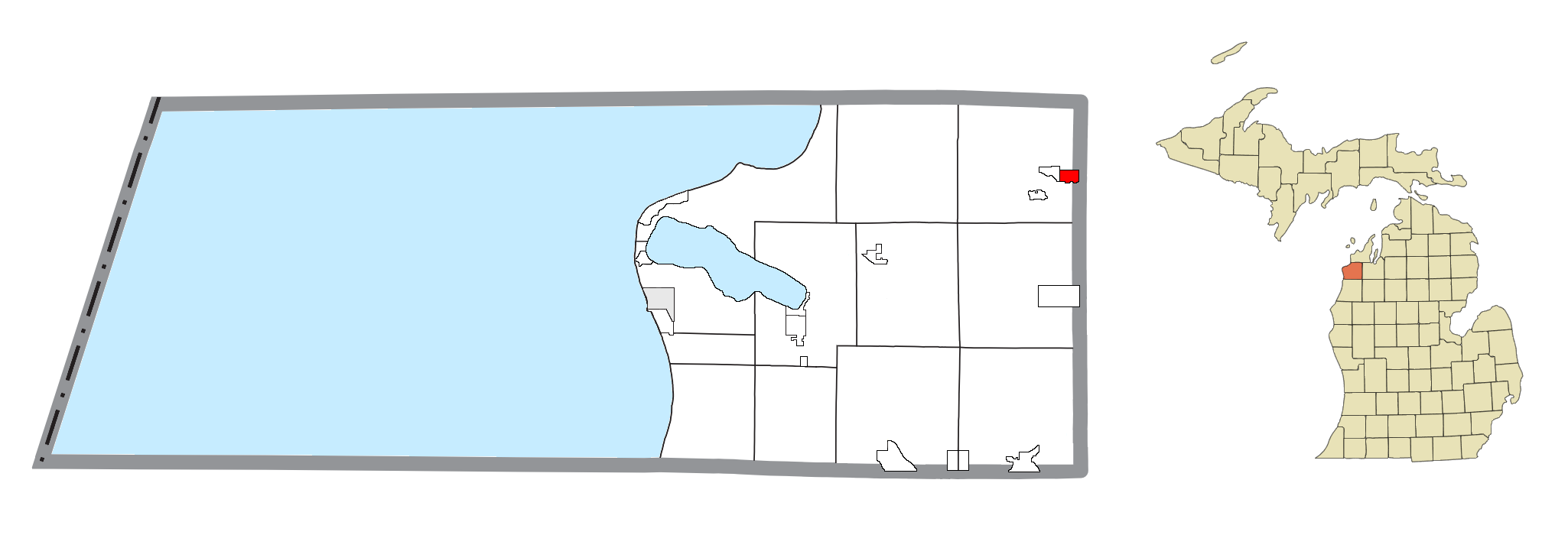
- Location within Benzie County

- Location within the state of Michigan Hardwood Acres (the United States)
- Coordinates: 44°43′19″N 85°49′36″W
- Country: United States
- State: Michigan
- County: Benzie
- Township: Almira

Area
  - Total: 0.54 sq mi (1.40 km^{2})
  - Land: 0.53 sq mi (1.38 km^{2})
  - Water: 0.0077 sq mi (0.02 km^{2})
- Elevation: 902 ft (275 m)

Population (2020)
  - Total: 393
  - Density: 738/sq mi (285.1/km^{2})
- Time zone: UTC-5 (Eastern (EST))
  - Summer (DST): UTC-4 (EDT)
- ZIP code(s): 49650 (Lake Ann)
- Area code: 231
- FIPS code: 26-36585
- GNIS feature ID: 2583739

Hardwood Acres is an unincorporated community and census-designated place in Benzie County in the U.S. state of Michigan. The population was 393 at the 2020 census. Hardwood Acres is located within Almira Township.

== Geography ==
Hardwood Acres is located in the eastern part of Almira Township in northeastern Benzie County. The CDP is bordered by the village of Lake Ann to the west and by the Grand Traverse County line to the east. The northern edge of the CDP is formed by Maple Street, and the southern edge by Nofsger Road, Bellows Lake Road, and Serenity Lane.

According to the United States Census Bureau, the Hardwood Acres CDP has a total area of 0.54 square miles (1.4 km^{2}), of which 0.008 square miles (0.02 km^{2}), or 1.72%, is water.

== History ==
The community of Hardwood Acres was listed as a newly-organized census-designated place for the 2010 census, meaning it now has officially defined boundaries and population statistics for the first time.

== Demographics ==
Historical population
Census	Pop.	Note	%±
2010	432		—
2020	393		−9.0%
U.S. Decennial Census

Hardwood Acres has a population of 611, with 207 households and an average of 3 persons per household. The median age is 39.4, with 70% of the population being between the ages of 18 and 64. The median household income is $109,196. 3.4% of the population is below the poverty line.

== Education ==
Most of the CDP is in the Traverse City Area Public Schools (TCAPS). A portion is zoned to Benzie County Central Schools.
