= Traverse City Area Public Schools =

School district in Michigan

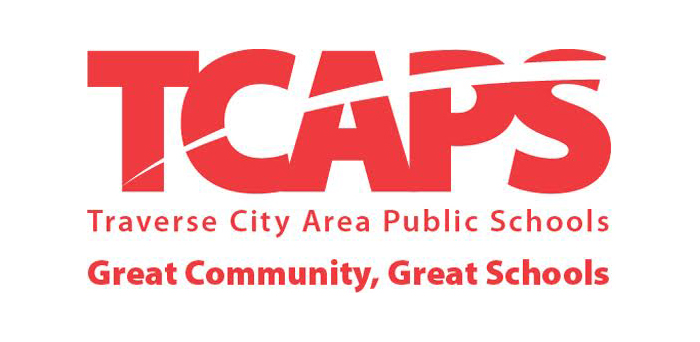

Address
- 1009 S. Oak Street Traverse City, Michigan, 49684; United States
- Coordinates: 44°45′10.3″N 85°37′49.2″W

District information
- Type: Public
- Motto: Great Community, Great Schools
- Grades: K-12
- Established: 1871; 155 years ago
- Superintendent: Dr. John VanWagoner
- NCES District ID: 2633870

Students and staff
- Students: 8,584 (2024-25)
- Teachers: 450.39 (on an FTE basis)
- Student–teacher ratio: 19.06

Other information
- Website: www.tcaps.net

Traverse City Area Public Schools (TCAPS; /ˈtiːkæps/ TEE-kaps) is a public school district based in Traverse City, Michigan. This district includes 10 elementary schools, 2 middle schools, 2 high schools, 1 alternative high school, and 1 Montessori school. The district is headquartered in the Glenn Loomis Building, a former elementary school located at 1009 S. Oak St. The district serves as the second-largest employer in Traverse City. As of 2017, TCAPS was the 18th largest school district in Michigan by enrollment.

The district serves 8,584 students (as of the 2024–25 school year) over an area of 283.6 square miles (735 km^{2}). The district encompasses about half of Grand Traverse County, as well as southeastern Leelanau County and a few square miles of eastern Benzie County.

The superintendent of TCAPS is John VanWagoner, who has served in that role since 2020.

== History ==
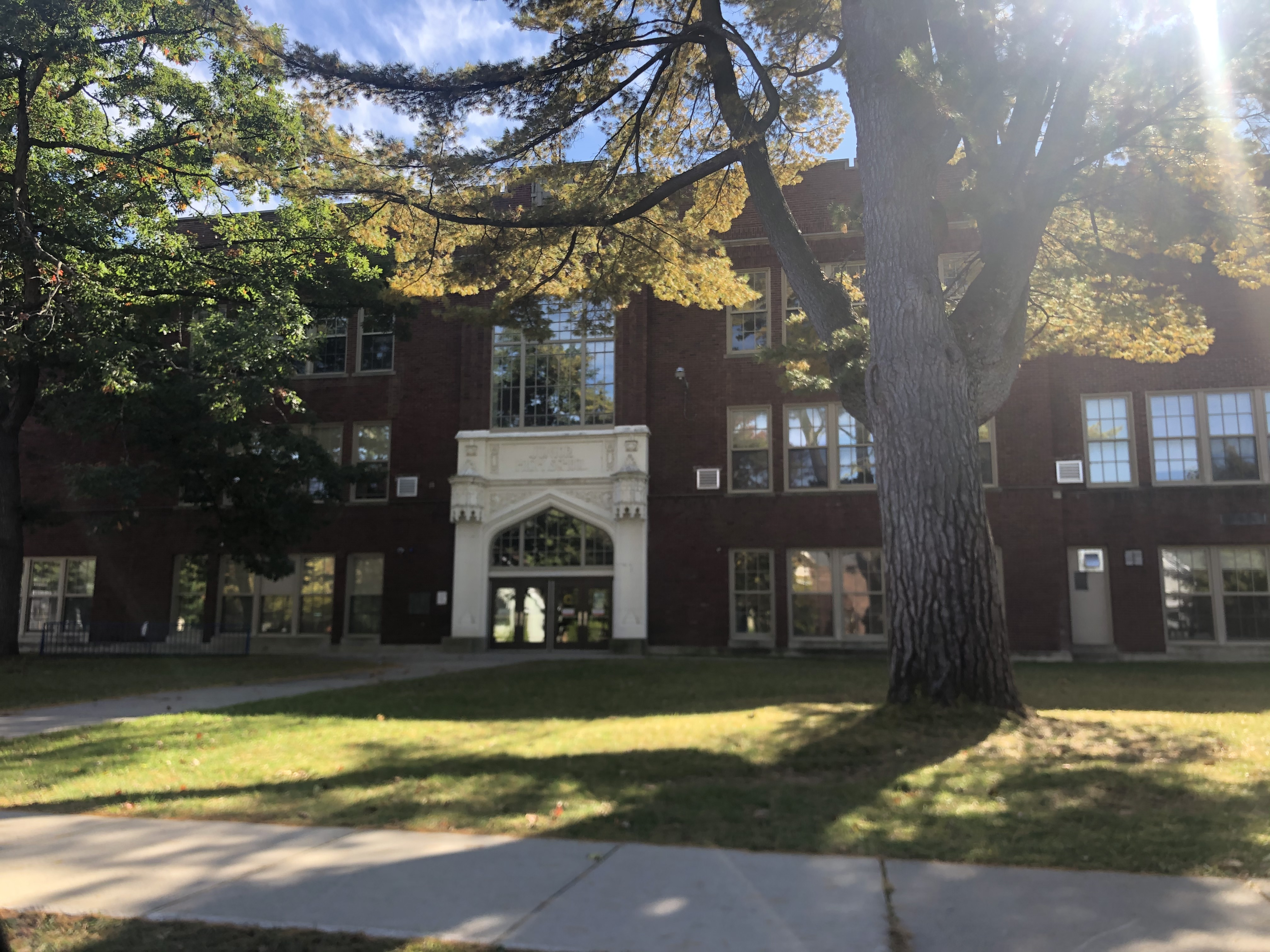
Central Grade School, the district's largest elementary school and former home of Traverse City High School from 1937 to 1959.

Traverse City's first public school district was founded in 1871 when Boardman, Central, Elmwood Avenue, Oak Park, and Union Street Independent Schools united. Today, all of these schools are closed, but Boardman, Central and Union Street school buildings are used for other purposes. Since 1871, many other schools around the area have been annexed and built.

In 1997, because of overcrowding at Traverse City Senior High School (TCSHS), which had become the largest high school in Michigan, a second high school was built, and opened in early 1998. The new high school became Traverse City West Senior High School, and the former TCSHS became Traverse City Central High School. This succeeded the split of Traverse City Junior High School into Traverse City West Junior High and East Junior High in 1992.

In the mid-2000s, due to dwindling attendance, five elementary schools closed their doors: Bertha Vos, Glenn Loomis, Norris, Oak Park, and Sabin Elementary schools. Also, until the 2009–10 school year, elementary schools in the district had grades K-6, junior high schools had 7–9, and senior highs had 10–12. However, at the beginning of this school year, the 6th grade class was moved to the junior highs (renamed middle schools), and the freshman class was moved to the senior high schools.

In 2011, the original Long Lake Elementary closed to be rebuilt nearby. This was the first time since 1997 that the district had opened a new building.

In March 2016, TCAPS decided to close Bertha Vos International School and Interlochen Community. Officials almost closed Old Mission Elementary School, but an unknown donor has pledged to pay about $100,000 to keep it open. In May 2016, the nearby Kingsley Area Schools decided to look into purchasing the Interlochen. For both 2015 and 2016 the TCAPS Japanese exchange program, in which TCAPS students exchange with Japanese ones for one week, has been completely paid for by an anonymous donor.

In May 2017, Eastern Elementary closed for a rebuild, similar to the rebuild of Long Lake Elementary six years prior. The project lasted the entire 2017/18 school year, and was completed in summer of 2018. The students were moved to the nearby vacant Bertha Vos, which closed the previous year. This project cost around $10 million. Also in 2017, a Traverse City food company called Food for Thought bought the vacant Long Lake Elementary School building, which was used as an elementary school before 2011. The company remodeled the elementary building into a warehouse.

Also in 2017, both Traverse City Central and West High Schools were named among the most challenging in the country.

In 2018, TCAPS has three vacant properties around the Traverse City Area. It is unknown if these properties are to become schools, but TCAPS has expressed feelings of building a new district headquarters, replacing the old Boardman Building in Traverse City. Also in 2018, Old Mission School became an independent district, further lowering the number of elementary schools in the district.

In 2019, Paul Soma retired as superintendent of TCAPS, and Ann Cardon took over. However, that October, Cardon resigned, due to tension between her and the school board. Former superintendent Jim Pavelka took the position of interim superintendent. On May 20, 2020, Dr. John VanWagoner, former superintendent of Alpena Public Schools, was elected to become the next superintendent. VanWagoner was elected by the board 7–0 over Denise Herrmann, former superintendent of the Roseville Joint Union High School District in Roseville, California. VanWagoner was officially hired in June 2020.

Also in 2019, TCAPS announced their intent to rebuild their Montessori school at the old Glenn Loomis Elementary, set to open in the 2021–2022 school year. Proposed locations included east of Thirlby Field, its current location west of Thirlby Field, or on Franke Road near Meijer. In January 2020, TCAPS voted to build on the Franke Road location. The school officially opened in June 2023, after years of delay. This succeeds a number of school rebuilds and remodels around the area, including the building of remodeled front entrances at Courtade, Willow Hill, Silver Lake Elementary schools, as well as West Middle School, during summer of 2019, and Westwoods and Blair in 2020. Blair, Silver Lake, and Westwoods Elementary schools had also been expanded in the previous years to accommodate a higher number of students.

In the 2025–2026 school year, every TCAPS school (17 schools) earned the Michigan Green School recognition, making TCAPS one of two school districts in the state to obtain 100% participation.

=== COVID-19 pandemic ===
Due to the COVID-19 pandemic, amidst three documented cases in Michigan and other Michigan schools closing, TCAPS announced they would stay open, for the benefit of the parents. However, Governor Gretchen Whitmer announced the closure of all K-12 districts until April 6, 2020. On April 2 of that year, the rest of the 2019–2020 school year was cancelled. The first two weeks of the 2020–21 school year began on September 8 with online schooling. Following this, the district went back to in-person schooling.

Later in the year, on October 20, TCAPS reported that a staff member at Traverse City Central High School had contracted COVID-19. The next two days, a Wednesday and Thursday, would see Central students revert to online classes while the Grand Traverse County Health Department conducted contact tracing, with the following Friday seeing students return to in-school learning. However, other TCAPS schools, including Traverse City West Senior High School, would remain open. On Sunday, November 8, TCAPS announced cases at West Senior High, and announced that that school would be closed the following day. However, the next day, another case was announced, and TCAPS closed west again for the next day. On Tuesday, November 10, TCAPS announced they would be closing both high schools, as well as both middle schools, for the rest of the week, while all elementary schools would remain open. On Friday, November 13, TCAPS extended this second shutdown for the whole of the next week too. Two days later, the Michigan Department of Health and Human Services ordered all high schools resort to online learning once again, while leaving all K-8 schools open with restrictions. An additional two weeks in April 2021 saw the middle and high schools close due to Michigan's rapid rise in COVID cases.

=== Racist group chat incident ===
In April 2021, TCAPS revealed that some high school students (at both Central and West) were involved in a Snapchat group called "Slave Trade", in which pictures of African American students were posted and assigned price tags. Screenshots showed messages such as "All Blacks should die" and "Let's have another Holocaust". TCAPS and the Grand Traverse County Sheriff's Department conducted investigations at both high schools.

== Board of education ==
The following table lists members of the current TCAPS Board of Education (as of 2025):

Member	Position	Appointment
Scott Newman-Bale	President	2021
Erica Moon Mohr	Vice President	2019
Josey Ballenger	Secretary	2021
Scott Hardy	Treasurer	2025
Sara Bageris	Trustee	2025
Beth Pack	Trustee	2023
Ty Schmidt	Trustee	2025

== School district boundary ==
Most of the district is in Grand Traverse County. It includes the portion of Traverse City in that county, as well as the following townships: East Bay, Garfield, Long Lake, Peninsula, and Union. It also includes portions of Acme, Blair, Grant, Green Lake, and Whitewater townships. Census-designated places in this county within the district are Chums Corner, Grawn, and Interlochen.

A portion of the district is in Leelenau County. The district covers that county's portion of Traverse City and sections of Elmwood Charter Township and Solon Township. This section includes Greilickville.

A portion of the district is in Almira Township, Benzie County. This section of the district includes most of the Hardwood Acres CDP.

== Schools ==
=== High schools ===
TCAPS offers two comprehensive high schools, serving grades 9 through 12. In addition, the district offers alternative high school education.

==== Central High School ====
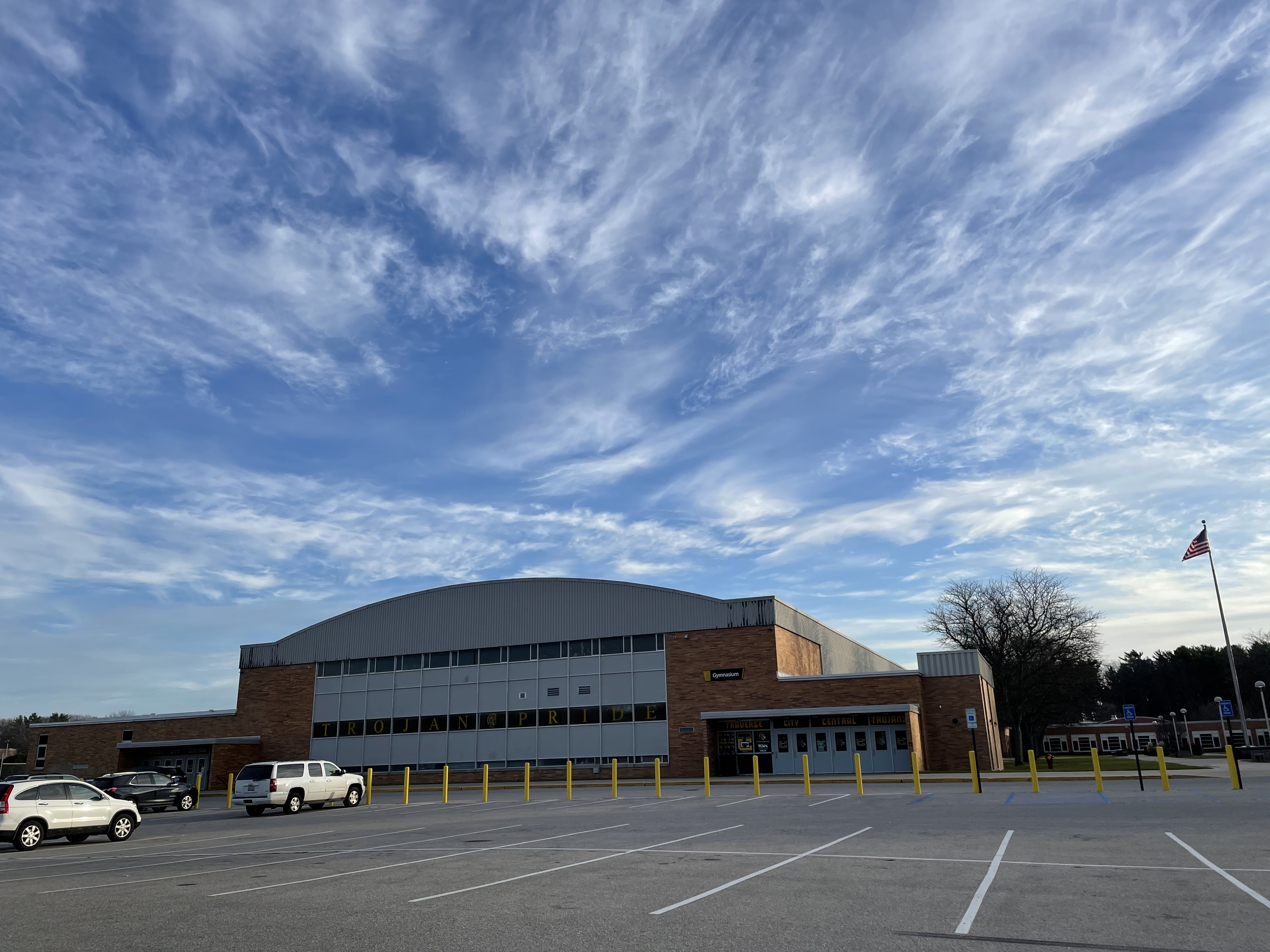
Traverse City Central High School

Traverse City Central High School is Traverse City's oldest high school. Originally opened in 1853, the school is changed names and locations a multitude of times. Its current location was opened in 1959. In 1997, the school, which had previously been named Traverse City Senior High School, changed names to Traverse City Central High School, after the original senior high school split to form West Senior High. Its athletic teams are known as the Trojans. The school's current principal is Ben Berger, and enrolls 1,326 students.

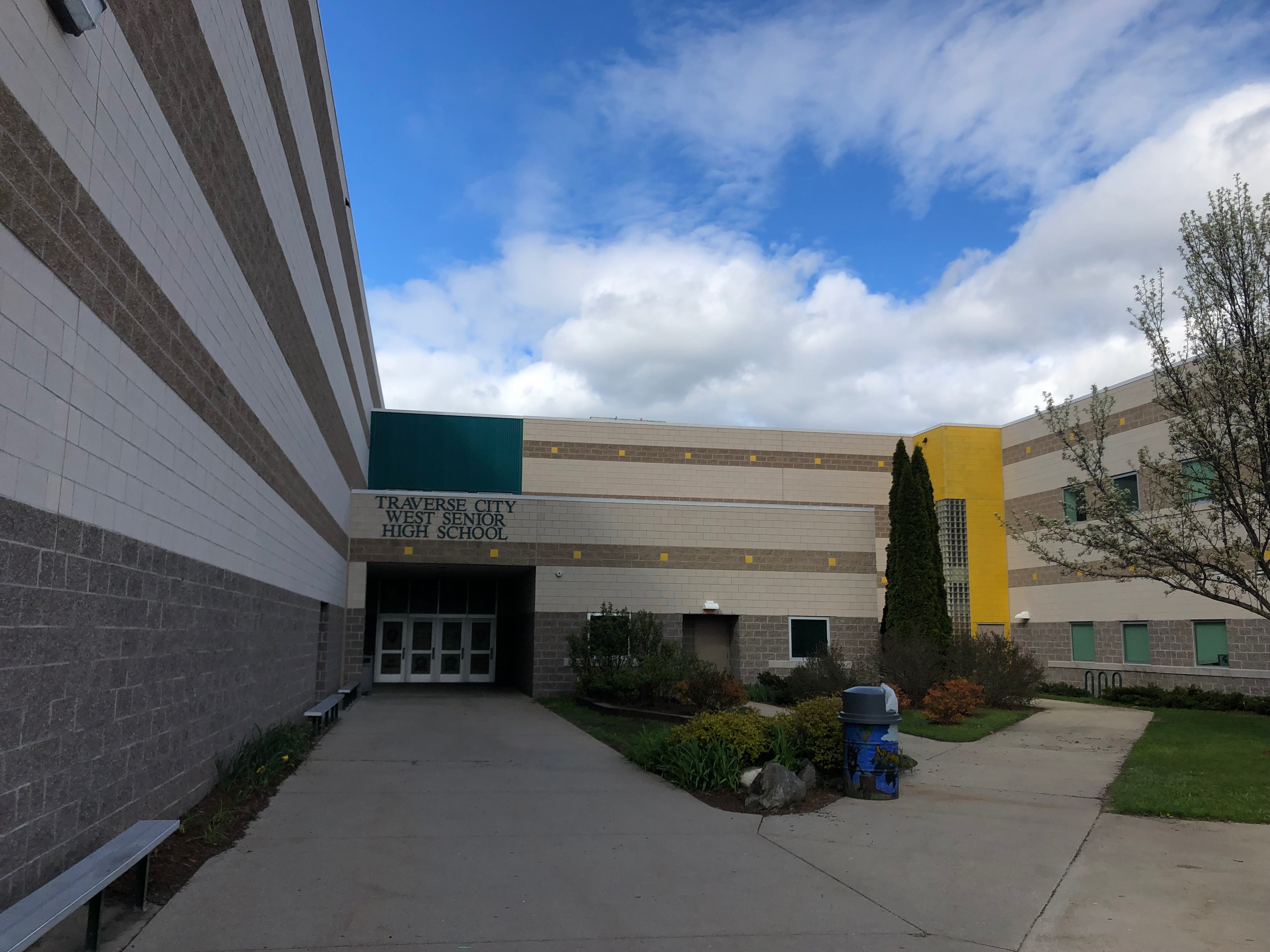
Traverse City West Senior High School

==== West Senior High School ====
Traverse City West Senior High School is Traverse City's second comprehensive high school. It was opened in 1997 after overcrowding at the former Traverse City Senior High School. The school's principal is Brian Guiney, who has served since 2025. It enrolls 1,384 students, making it the largest high school in Michigan north of Kent County. Its athletic teams are known as the Titans.

==== Traverse City High School ====
TCAPS offers alternative education at Traverse City High School. The school is located on Three Mile Road at the site of the former East Bay Elementary School. Despite having no athletic teams, the school's students are referred to as the "Mavericks", and its colors are maroon and gold. Its principal is Jennifer Ciolek.

=== Middle schools ===
TCAPS has two middle schools, serving grades 6, 7 and 8.

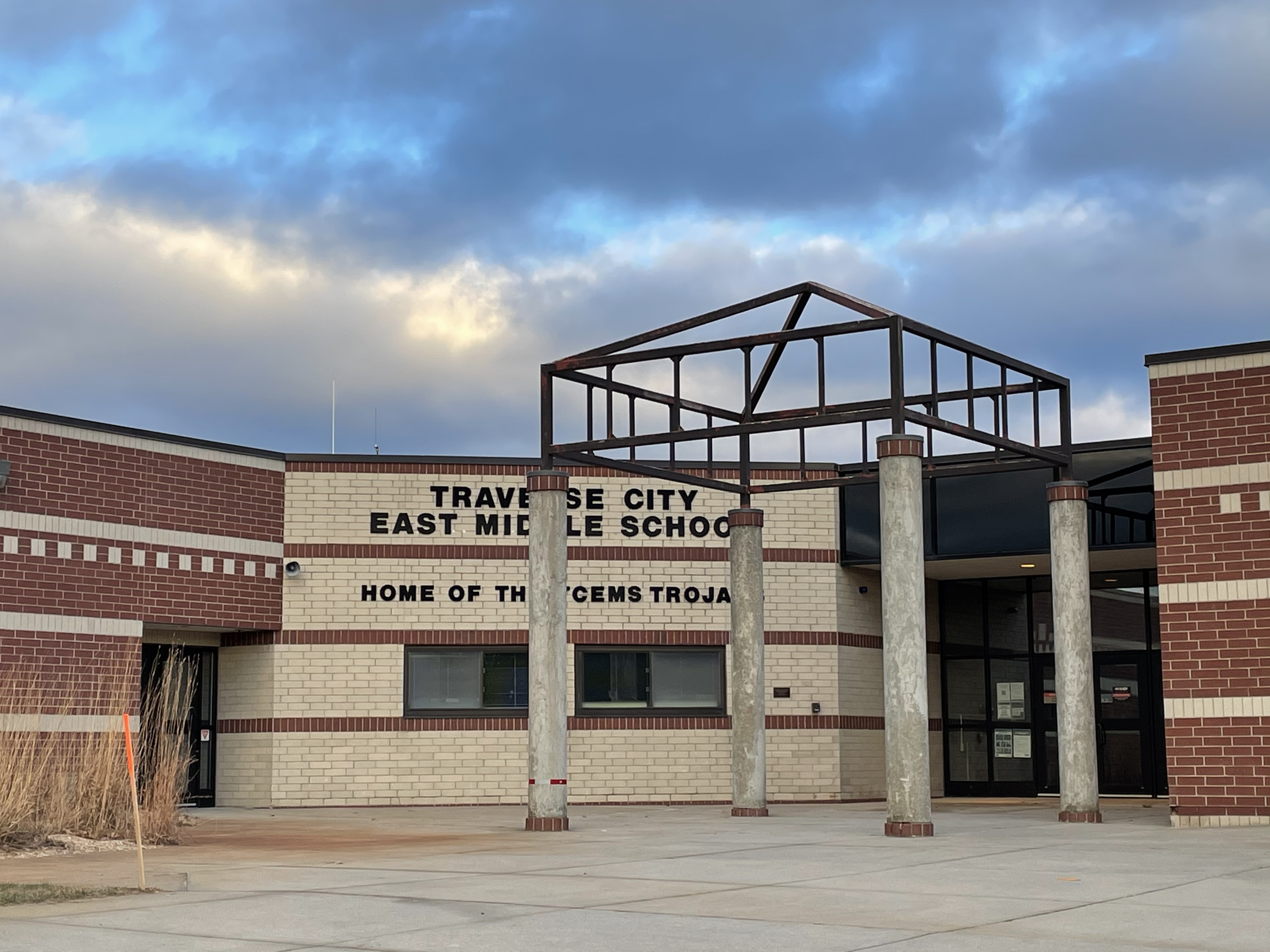
Traverse City East Middle School

==== East Middle School ====
Traverse City East Middle School is Traverse City's public middle school serving Traverse City's east side. Because it serves as a feeder to Central High School, East Middle's athletic teams are also known as the Trojans, with colors black and gold. It is located on Three Mile Road, on the same campus as Cherry Knoll Elementary School. The school was opened in 1992 to relieve crowding at the former Traverse City Junior High School. The school's current principal is Ryan Ranger, and enrolls 829 students.

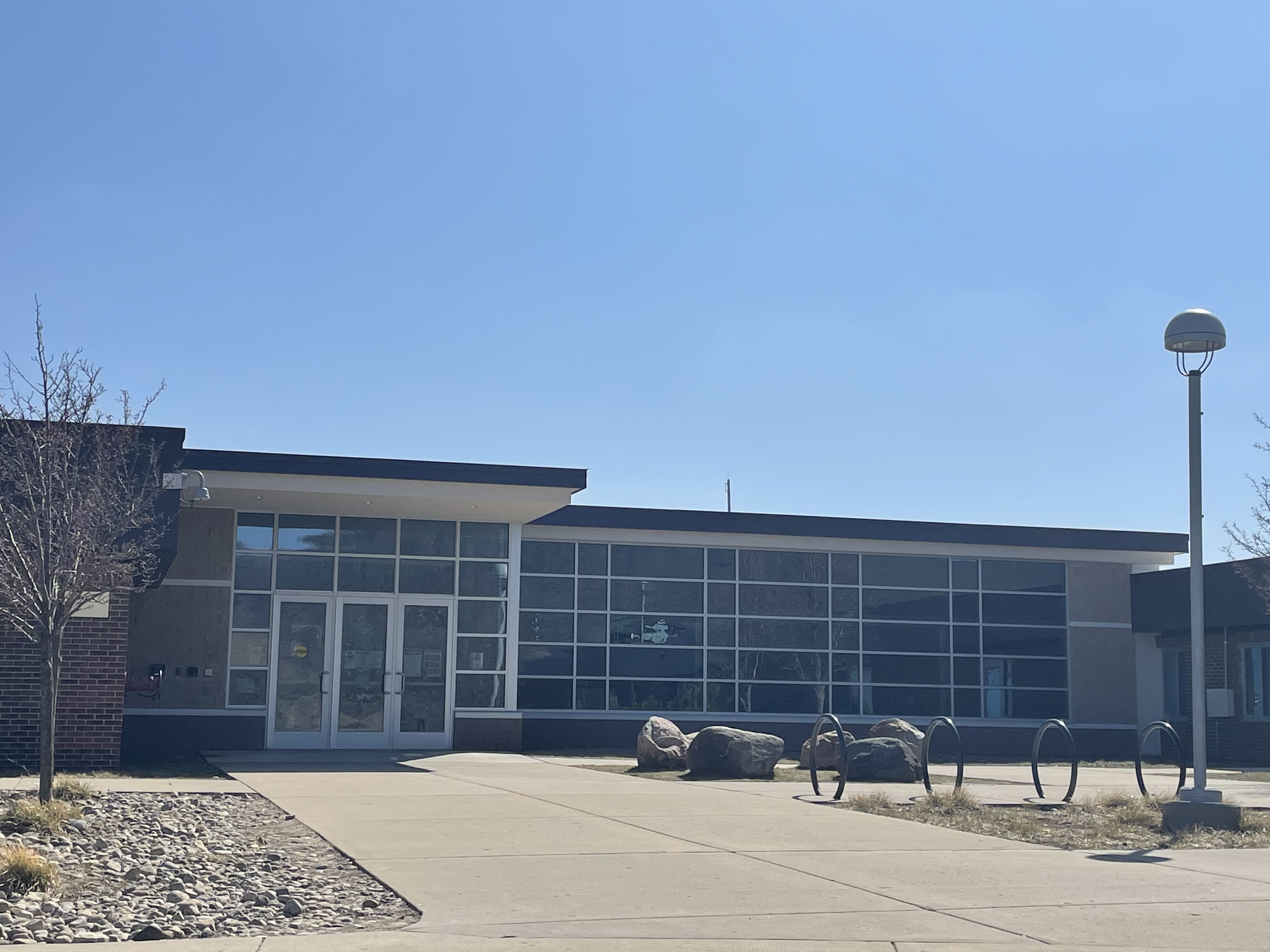
Traverse City West Middle School

==== West Middle School ====
Traverse City West Middle School is Traverse City's public middle school serving Traverse City's west side. The school's athletic teams are known as the Titans, as the school serves as a feeder to West Senior High School. Like that school, West Middle's colors are forest green and metallic gold. The school is located on grounds formerly used for agriculture by the Traverse City State Hospital. The school, formerly known as Traverse City Junior High School, was formerly located in what is now Central Grade School, but was located outside of the city to its current locale in the 1970s. In the 1990s, the original middle school was split into East and West Middle Schools. The school's current principal is Kristin Stuedemann, and the school enrolls 1,081 students.

=== Elementary schools ===
TCAPS offers 10 standard elementary schools, serving grades prekindergarten through 5. In addition, the district offers a K-8 montessori school.

School name	2024-25 enrollment	Opened	Principal	Address	High school	Mascot	Colors
Blair Elementary	202	1992	Kirk Ranney	1625 Sawyer Road, Traverse City, MI 49684	Central/West	Bobcats	
Central Grade School	510	1970	Jana DuGuay	301 West Seventh Street, Traverse City, MI 49684	Central/West	Superstars	
Cherry Knoll Elementary	333	1956	Victoria Derks	1800 North Three Mile Road, Traverse City, MI 49696	Central	Wildcats	
Courtade Elementary	215	1992	Andrew Phillips	1111 Rasho Road, Traverse City, MI 49696	Central	Cougars	
Eastern Elementary	475	1950s	Jonathan Swegles	1600 Eastern Avenue, Traverse City, MI 49686	Central	Stars	
Long Lake Elementary	364	???	Kate Burwinkel	7600 North Long Lake Road, Traverse City, MI 49685	West	Panthers	
Silver Lake Elementary	286	1992	Angela Camp	5858 Culver Road, Traverse City, MI 49685	West	Seahawks	
TCAPS Montessori	331	2008	Tracy Rucker	4053 Franke Road, Traverse City, MI 49684	Central/West	Timberwolves	
Traverse Heights Elementary	245	???	Bryan Kay	933 Rose Street, Traverse City, MI 49686	Central	RoadRunners	
Westwoods Elementary	365	1992	Toby Tisdale	1500 Fisher Road, Traverse City, MI 49685	West	Wings	
Willow Hill Elementary	429	1956	Angela Sides-McKay	1250 Hill Street, Traverse City, MI 49684	West	Falcons	

==== Closed elementary schools ====
School Name	Closed	Address	High school	Mascot	Colors	Fate
Boardman School	1978	412 Webster Street, Traverse City, MI 49686	TCSHS	???	???	Converted to district headquarters, sold in 2024
Bertha Vos Elementary	2008	3723 Shore Road, Williamsburg, MI 49690	Central	Bobcats		Converted to TCAPS International, closed in 2016
East Bay Elementary	2002	3962 Three Mile Road, Traverse City, MI 49686	Central	Coyotes	???	Converted to Traverse City High School
Elmwood School	1956	Elmwood Avenue, Traverse City, MI 49684	TCSHS	???	???	Razed
Glenn Loomis Elementary	2008	1009 Oak Street, Traverse City, MI 49685	Central/West	Mercury		Converted to TCAPS Montessori, abandoned in 2023, converted to district headquarters in 2024
Interlochen Community School	2016	3113 M-137, Interlochen, MI 49643	West	Lakers		Sold to Interlochen Center for the Arts in 2022
Norris Elementary	2008	10781 Cherry Bend Road, Traverse City, MI 49684	West	Navigators		Sold, converted to Grand Traverse Regional Arts Campus
Oak Park Elementary	2006	301 Garfield Avenue, Traverse City, MI 49686	Central	Pirates		Converted to Northwest Educational Services School for Special Education
Old Mission Peninsula School	2018	2699 Island View Road, Traverse City, MI 49686	Central	Panthers		Sold to an independent charter school
Sabin Elementary	2006	2075 Cass Road, Traverse City, MI 49685	Central/West	Supercats		Converted to TCAPS Sabin Data Center
Union Street School	1959	South Union Street, Traverse City, MI 49684	TCSHS	???	???	Razed

=== Other facilities ===
TCAPS utilizes Northwest Educational Services facilities for other forms of education. The Northwest Educational Services Career Tech is a technological education center used by West and Central High Schools. Oak Park school (former Oak Park Elementary), also owned by Northwest Educational Services, is used as a special education school

== Athletic facilities ==
Thirlby Field in Traverse City, which seats 9000, serves as a neutral ground between the athletic teams on Traverse City's west and east sides. The stadium is used by both Traverse City West and Central, as well as St. Francis High School, as a home field for football, soccer, and lacrosse. Both high schools also use Howe Arena and Centre Ice Arena for ice hockey and figure skating. The Grand Traverse Bay YMCA complexes are used for swim meets. Both high schools in the district, as well as middle schools, have their own football fields, used for smaller football games, as well as track and field. These schools also have their own baseball, softball, and tennis court complexes.

== Gallery ==
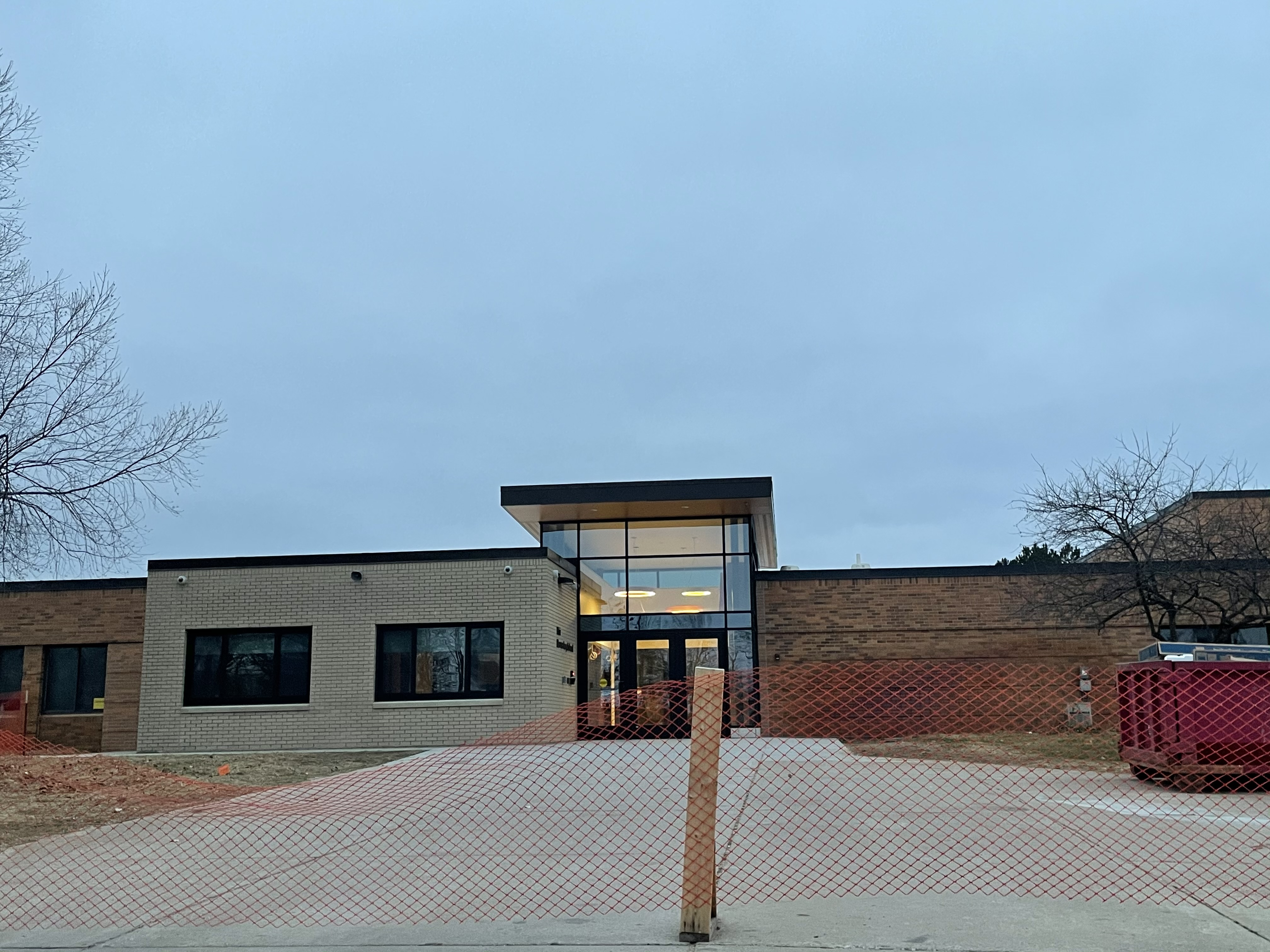
Blair Elementary School

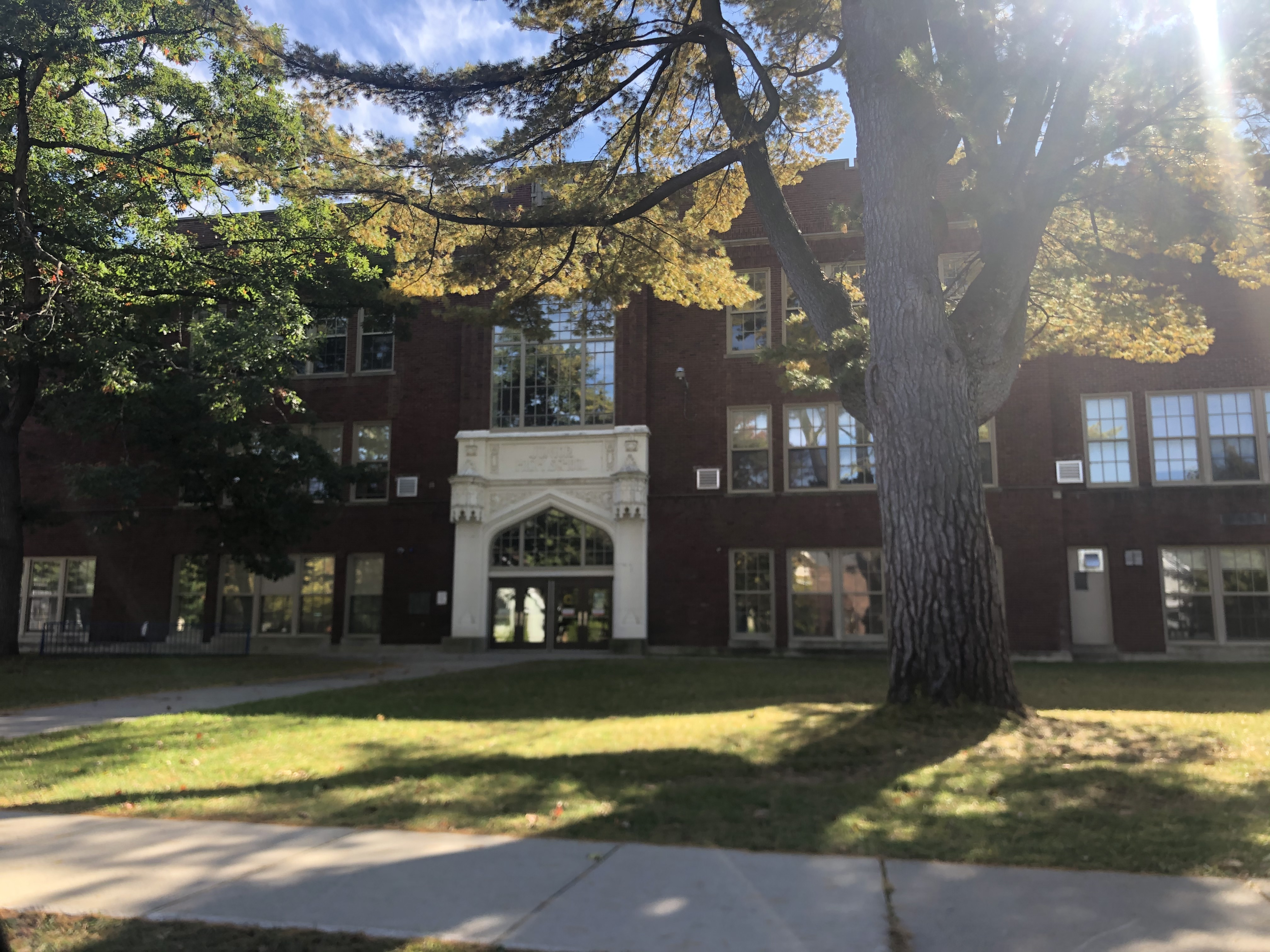
Central Grade School

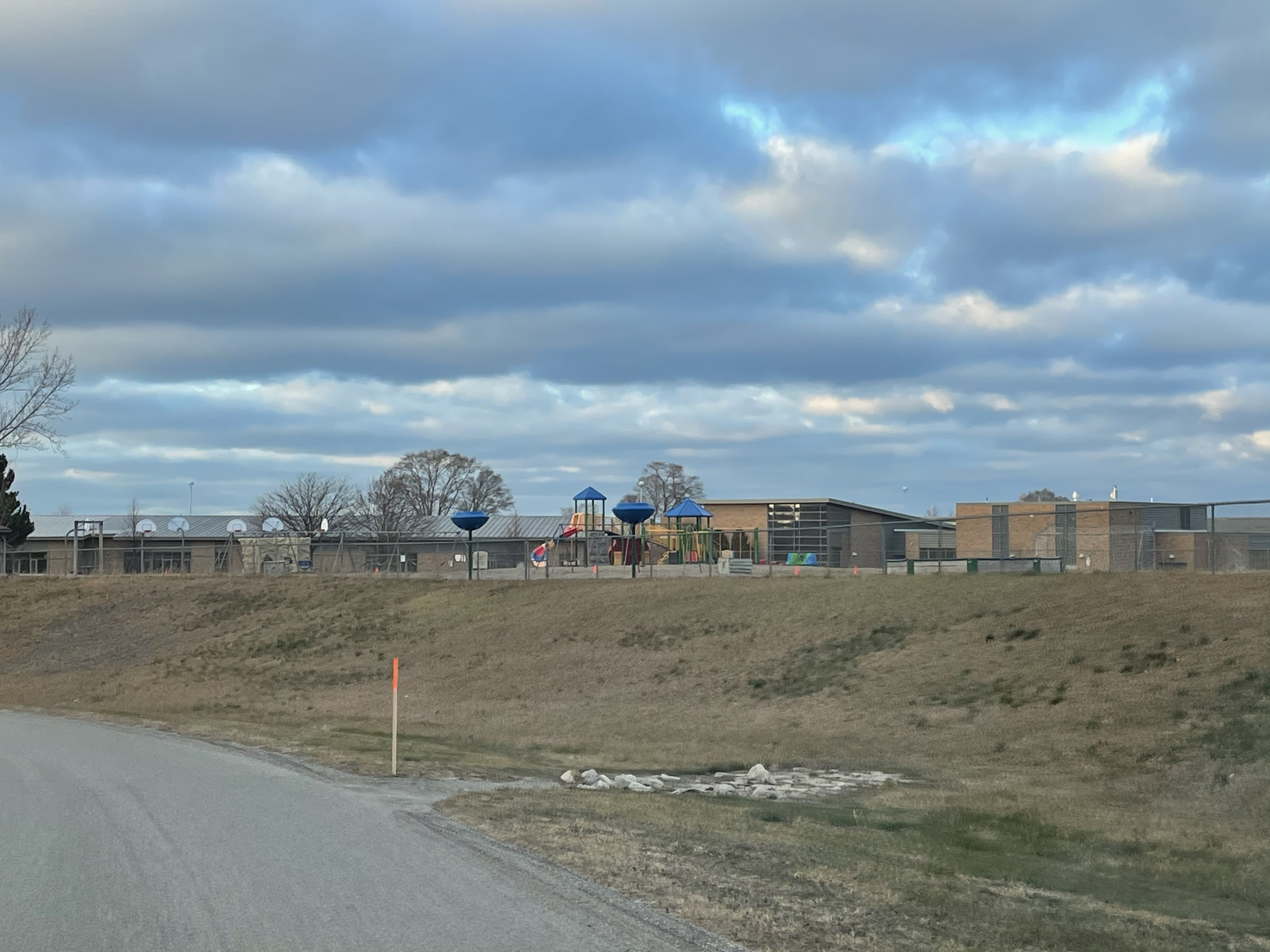
Cherry Knoll Elementary School

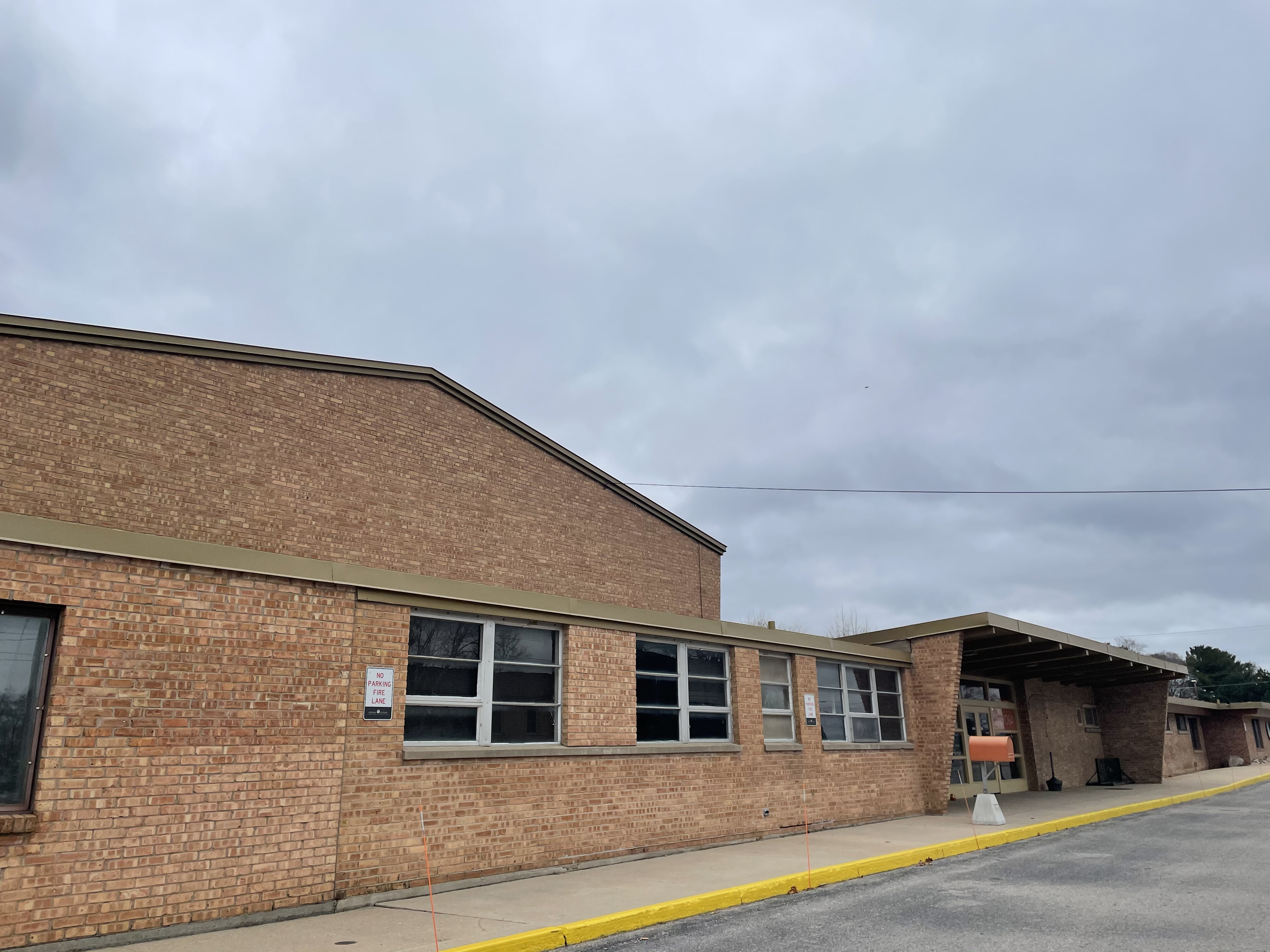
Norris Elementary School (closed 2008, now an art studio)

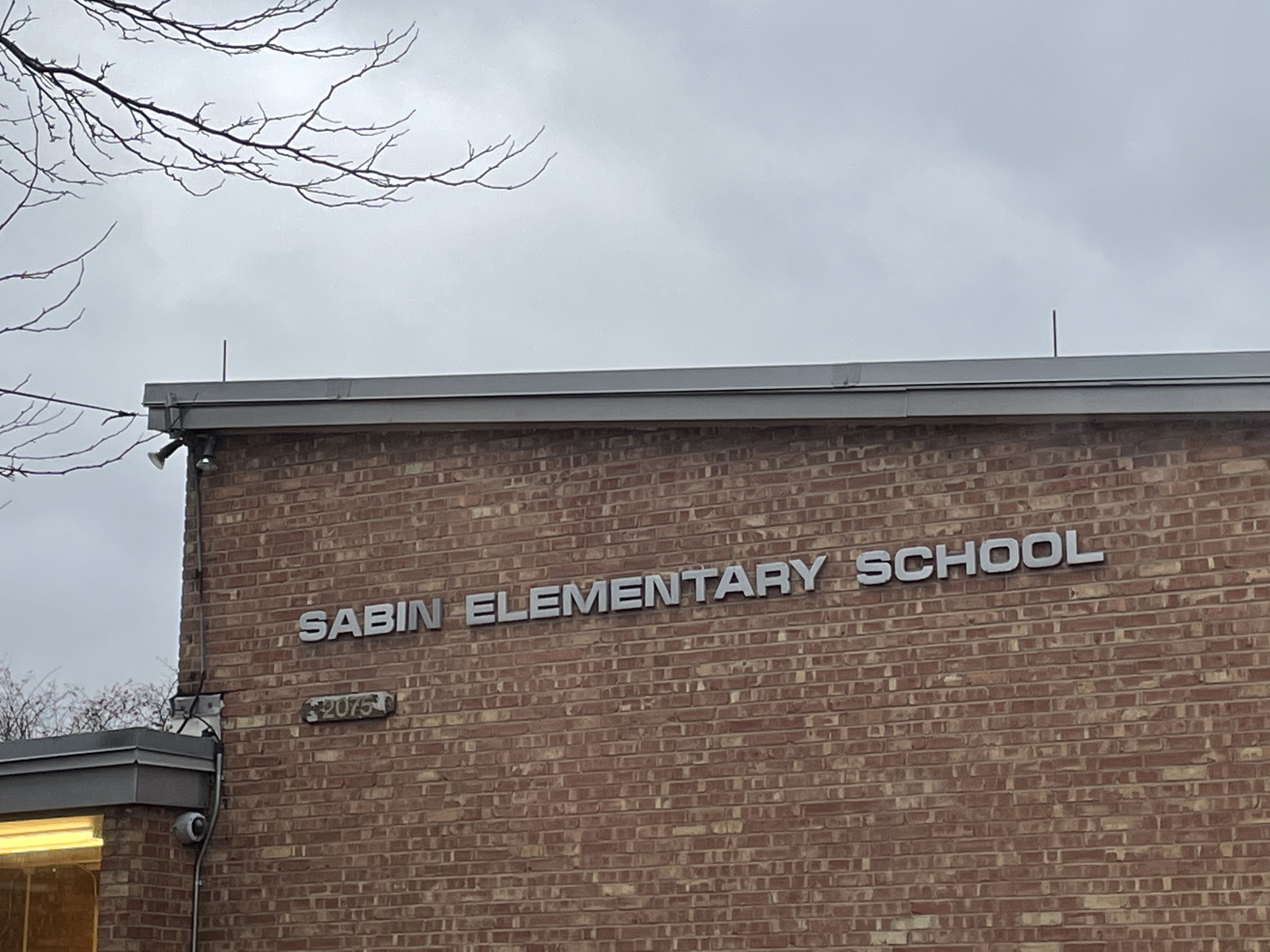
Sabin Elementary School (closed 2006)

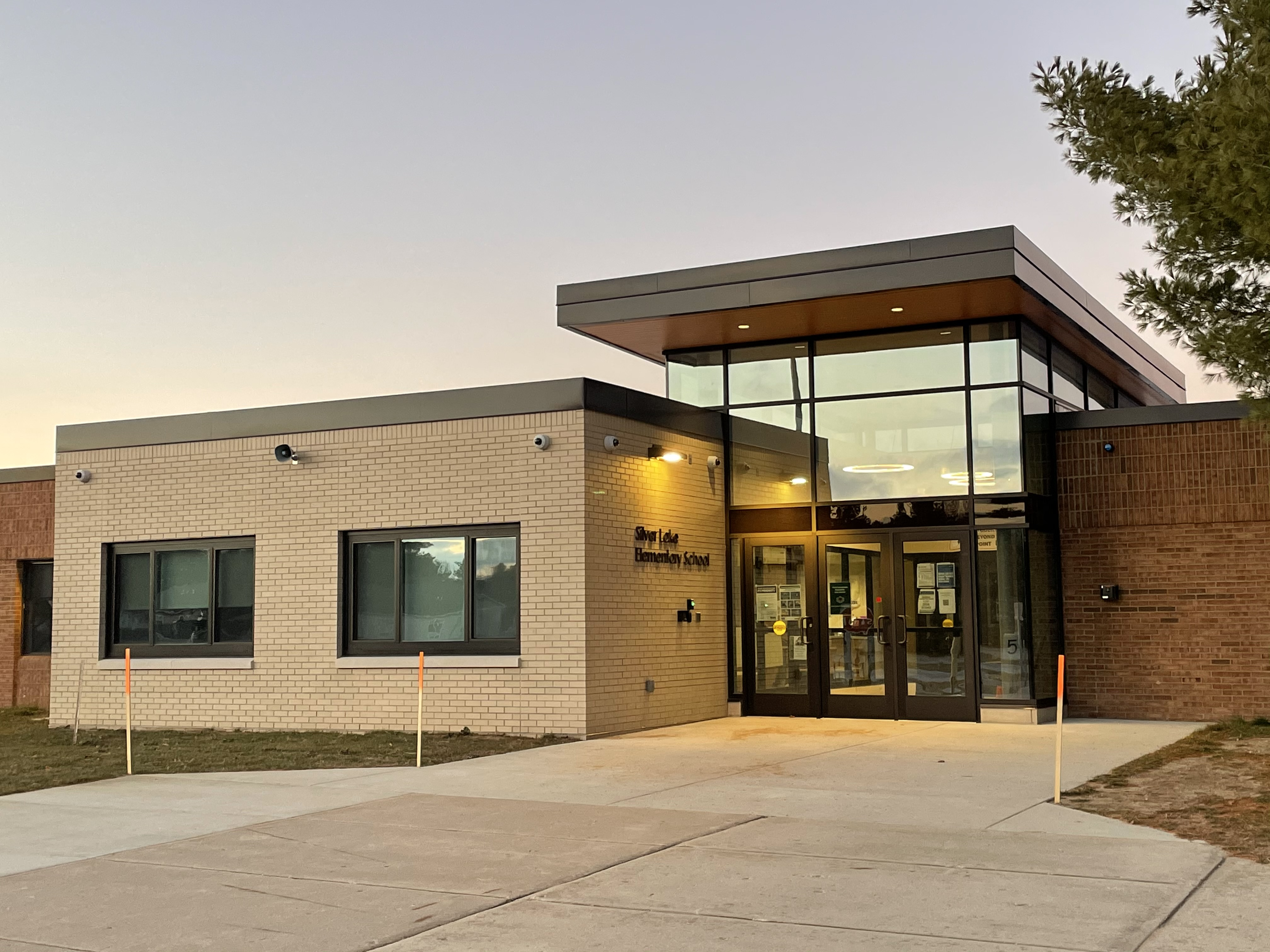
Silver Lake Elementary School

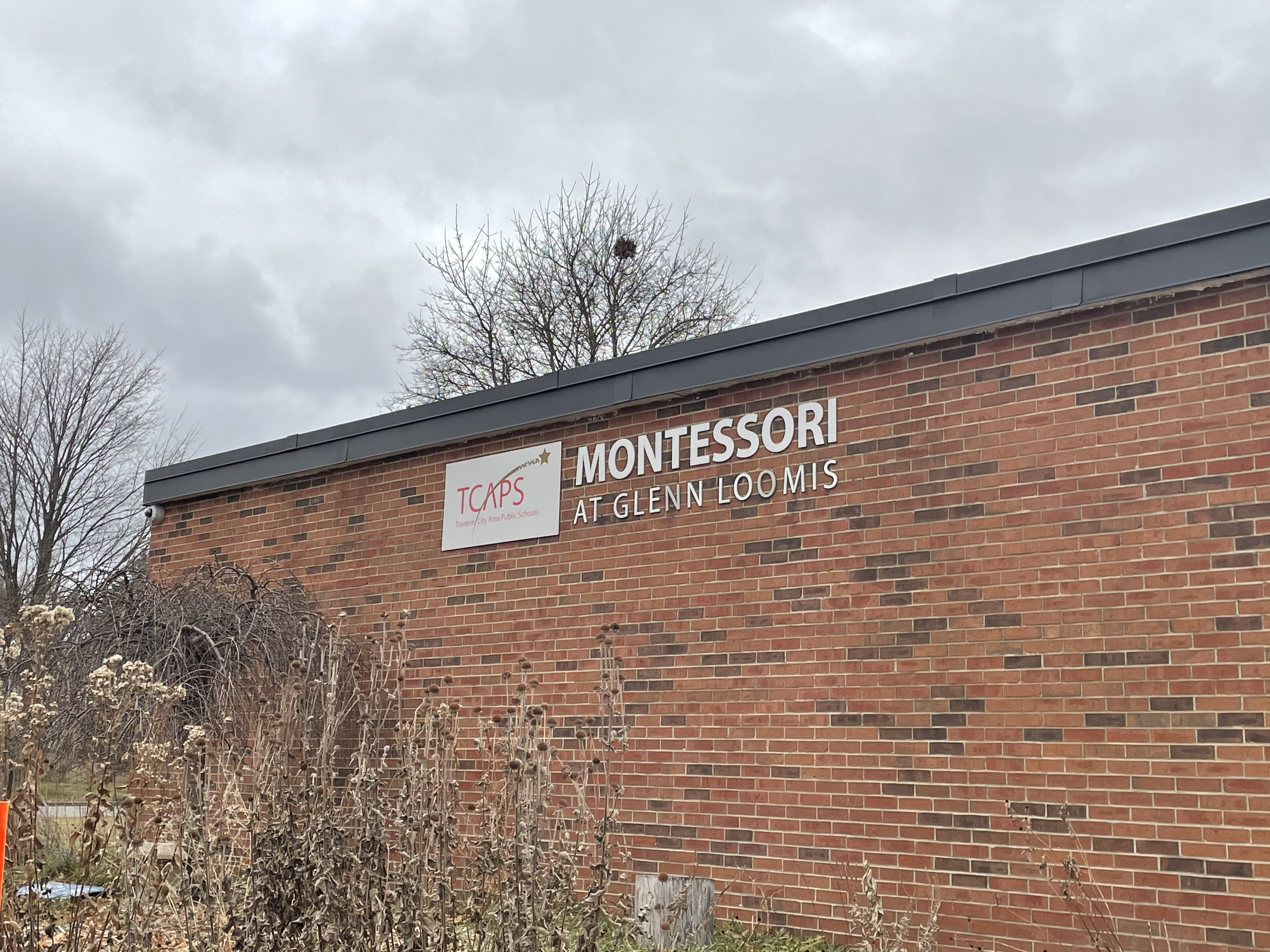
TCAPS Montessori (formerly Glenn Loomis Elementary School)

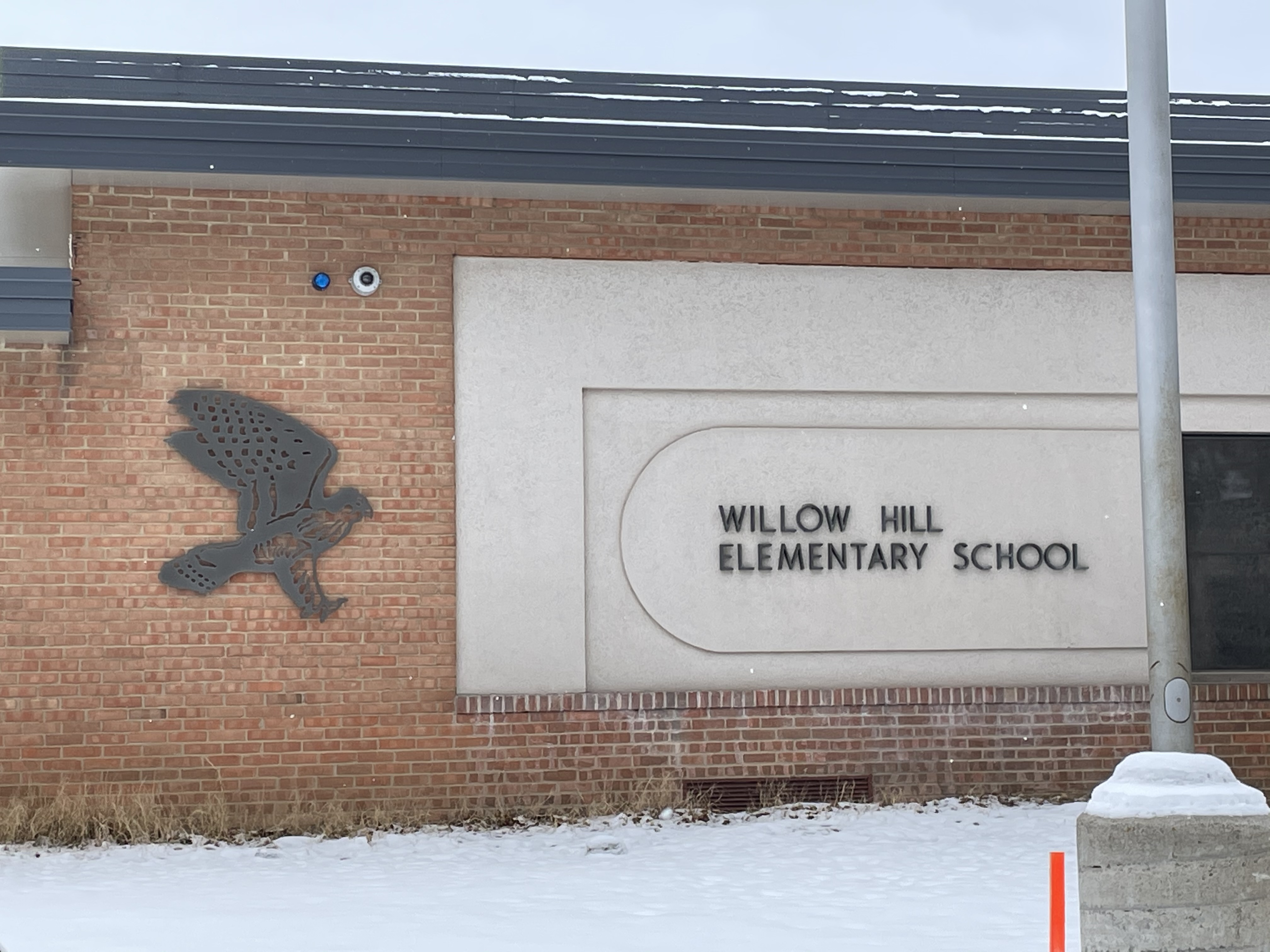
Willow Hill Elementary School

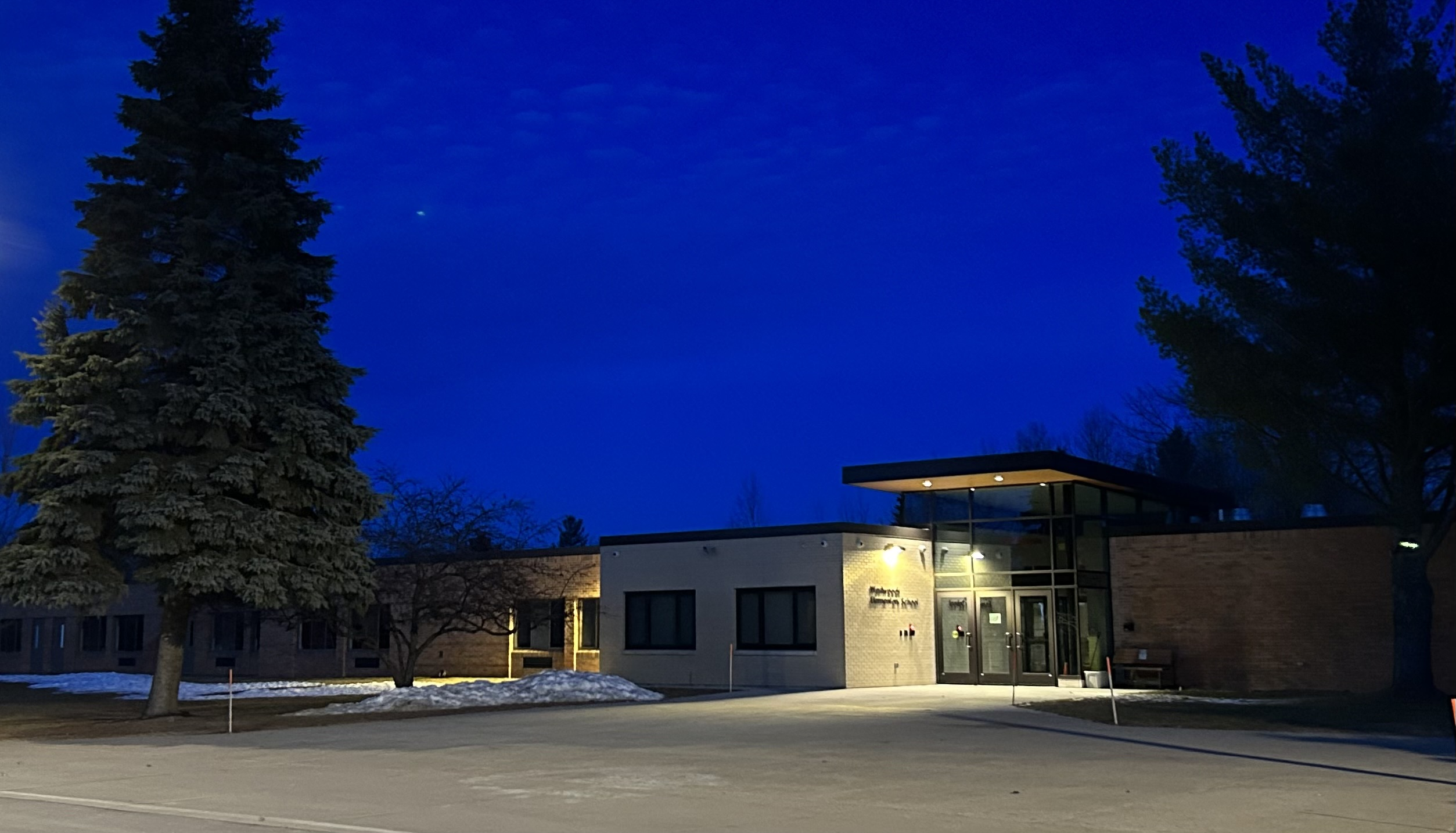
Westwoods Elementary School

== See also ==
- List of high schools in Michigan
- Education in Michigan
