= Alpena High School (Michigan) =

Location
- 3303 South Third Avenue; Alpena, Michigan 49707; United States
- Coordinates: 45°03′23″N 83°28′05″W

Information
- Type: Public high school
- School district: Alpena Public Schools
- Superintendent: David Rabbideau
- Principal: Romeo Bourdage
- Teaching staff: 61.11 (on an FTE basis)
- Grades: 9–12
- Enrollment: 1,096 (2023–2024)
- Student to teacher ratio: 17.93
- Colors: Green; White
- Athletics conference: Big North Conference
- Nickname: Wildcats
- Newspaper: The Wildcat
- Yearbook: The Anamakee
- Website: www.alpenaschools.com/o/ahs

Alpena High School is a public high school in Alpena, Michigan, United States. It serves students in grades 9–12 for the Alpena Public Schools.

== Academics ==
Alpena ranked 204th in Michigan and 5,937th nationally in the 2020 U.S. News & World Report annual survey of US public schools.

== Demographics ==
The demographic breakdown of the 1,147 students enrolled in 2020–21 was:

- Male - 50.3%
- Female - 49.7%
- Native American/Alaskan - 0.2%
- Asian - 0.4%
- Black - 0.5%
- Hispanic - 0.9%
- White - 94.3%
- Multiracial - 4%

In addition, 51.2% of the students were eligible for free or reduced-cost lunch.

== Athletics ==
Alpena's Wildcats compete in the Big North Athletic Conference. School colors are green and white. Alpena offers the following Michigan High School Athletic Association (MHSAA) sanctioned sports:

- Baseball (boys)
- Basketball (girls and boys)
- Competitive cheerleading (girls)
- Cross country (girls and boys)
- Football (boys)
- Golf (girls and boys)
- Ice hockey (boys)
  - State champion - 1981, 1987, 1993
- Soccer (girls and boys)
- Softball (girls)
- Tennis (girls and boys)
- Track and field (girls and boys)
- Volleyball (girls)
- Wrestling (boys)

== Notable alumni ==
- Lisa Dietlin, philanthropic consultant
- Jim Dutcher, former head basketball coach for the University of Minnesota
- Butch Feher, National Basketball Association (NBA) shooting guard
- Fred Grambau, Canadian Football League (CFL) defensive tackle
- Kenneth Joseph Povish, Roman Catholic bishop
- Paul Fitzpatrick Russell, auxiliary bishop of the Archdiocese of Detroit
- Chad Zielinski, Bishop of the Roman Catholic Diocese of New Ulm
