= Bingham School (Alpena, Michigan) =

- U.S. National Register of Historic Places
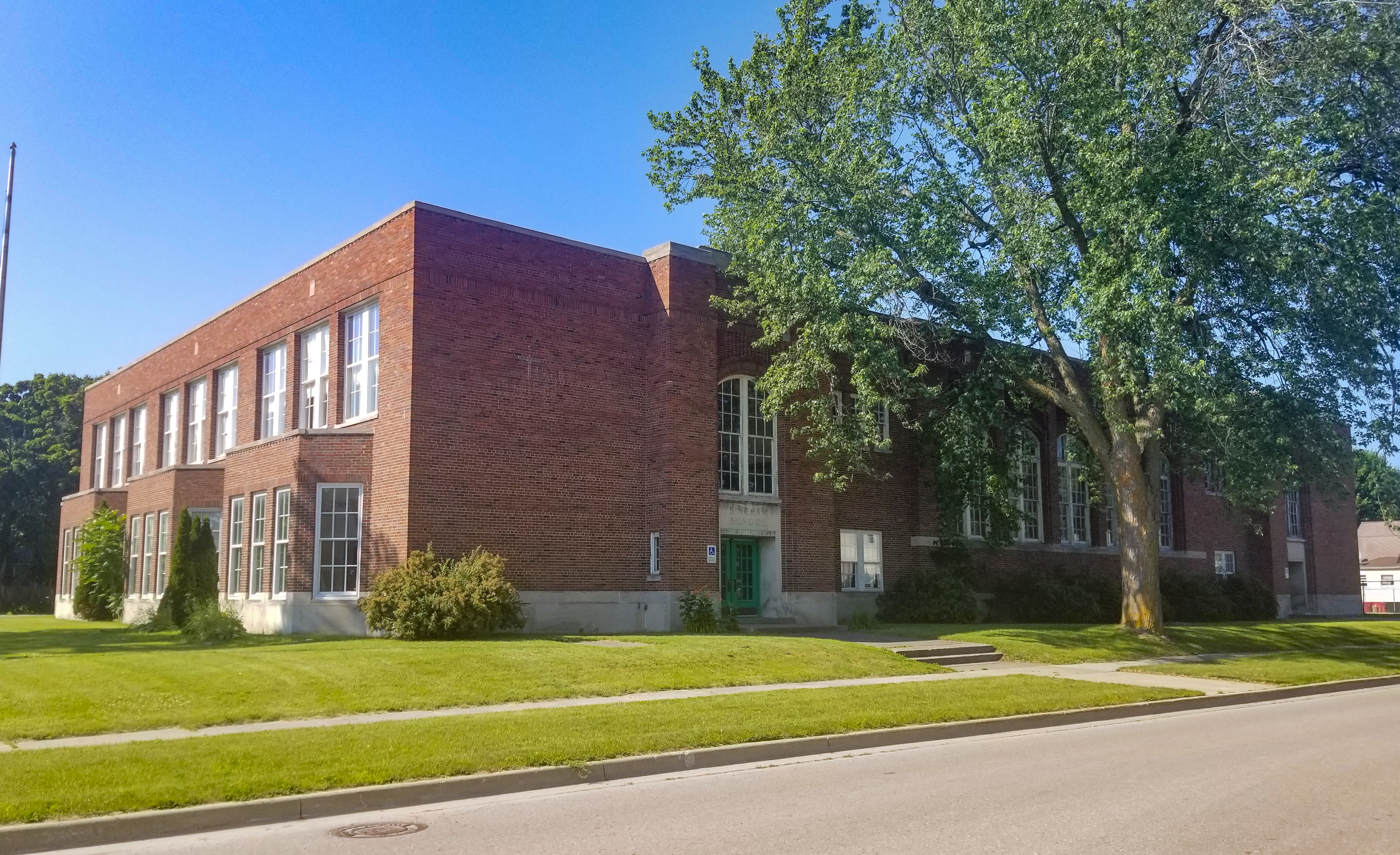
- Interactive map
- Location: 555 South 5th Ave. Alpena, Michigan, United States
- Coordinates: 45°03′45″N 83°26′30″W
- Built: 1936
- Built by: Spence Brothers
- Architect: Joseph C. Goddeyne
- Architectural style: Late Gothic Revival / Collegiate Gothic
- NRHP reference No.: 100005778
- Added to NRHP: November 10, 2020

Bingham School is a former elementary school located at 555 South 5th Avenue in Alpena, Michigan. It was listed on the National Register of Historic Places in 2020.

== History ==
The first school in Alpena was constructed in 1863, and a union school followed in 1870. In the 1880s, five small "ward schools" were constructed in neighborhoods to house younger students. As the city grew, these schools became almost immediately overcrowded. More schools were constructed, but despite this the space issue was chronic. The three ward schools on the city's south side, Franklin, Lockwood, and Cass, all remained in use into the 1930s. In 1935, however, the school board authorized the construction of a new building to replace these three.

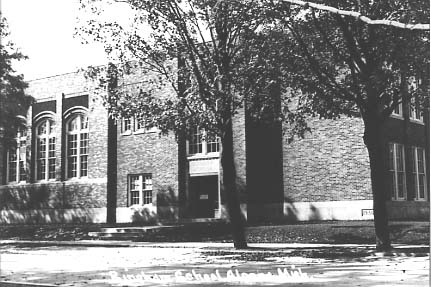
Bingham School c. 1936

Joseph C. Goddeyne was hired to provide a plan for the school, which had an estimated cost of $180,000. Fortunately, the WPA covered $81,000 of the cost. Construction began in 1935, and was completed in 1936. The school was named after Moses Bingham, one of the first settlers of Alpena, and the owner of its first hotel and first gristmill. This was the last elementary school built in the city until 1950. The city continued to grow, and student enrollment peaked in 1970 at over 9000 students. However, enrollment declined afterward, and by 1995 there were fewer than 6000 students enrolled' In 2008, there were only about 4500 students enrolled. Alpena Public Schools closed Bingham School in 1982.

After the school closed, it remained vacant for a time. It was sold to a private investor, and in 2004 was reopened as a charter school. The charter school closed in 2015, and the building has been vacant since that time.

== Description ==
Bingham School is two-story red brick Collegiate Gothic structure, laid out in a traditional H plan. The brick exterior is trimmed with light colored limestone detailing. There are two main entrances on the main façade located in two-story projecting bays. The entries are recessed with large segmental arched windows. Between the entry projections are five very large window openings. On either side are three bays with windows in the first and second floor.

On the interior are six classrooms on each floor, three on each side of the hall. The main floor also contains the principal's office, music teacher's office and rest rooms. In the front there is a combined gymnasium and auditorium located between the entrances; the gymnasium extends up to the second floor. The second floor also has classrooms, restrooms, and library and conference room.
