= Lisa Dietlin =

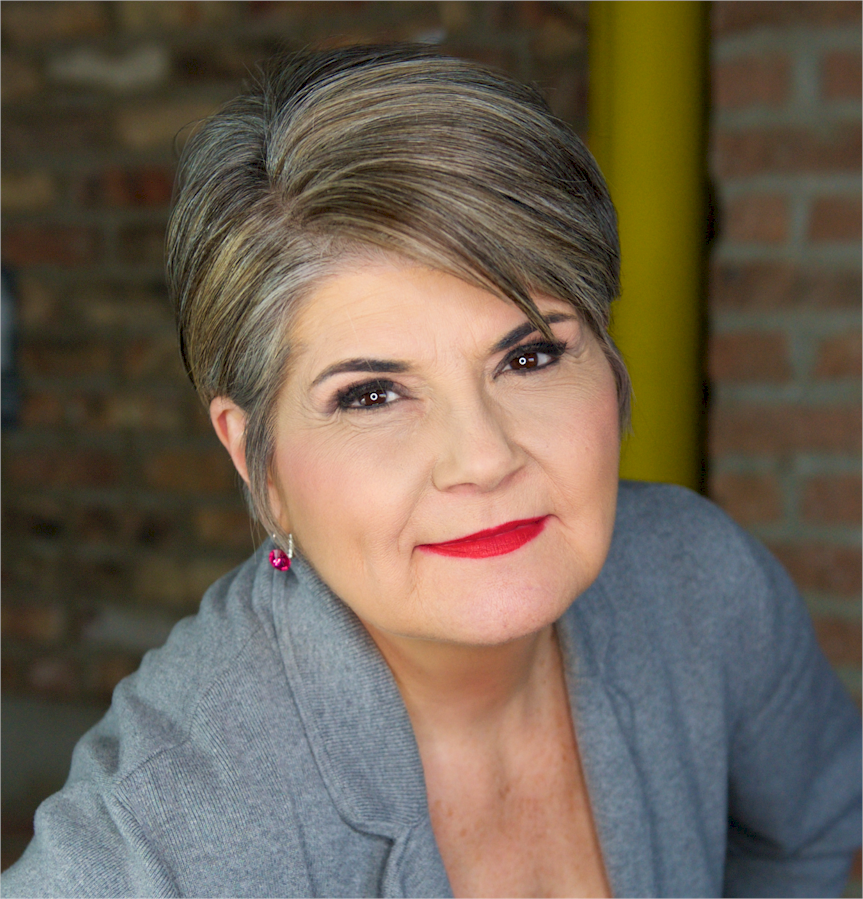
- Lisa M. Dietlin in 2018
- Born: August 20, 1963 (age 62); Alpena, Michigan, U.S.
- Education: Alpena High School; Alpena Community College; Michigan State University; St. Mary's University of Minnesota
- Occupations: President and CEO of The Institute of Transformational Philanthropy
- Website: www.lisadietlin.com

Lisa M. Dietlin (born August 20, 1963) is speaker and writer on the subject of philanthropy. She is the author of four books about the subject, and she is the president and CEO of the philanthropic consulting company The Institute of Transformational Philanthropy.

== Early life ==
Dietlin was born in Alpena, Michigan, and spent her childhood in Michigan and Montana. Her father died when she was 13, and she and her siblings were raised by her mother. After graduating from Alpena High School and Alpena Community College, Dietlin earned a degree from Michigan State University. She received a Master of Arts degree in Philanthropy and Development from St. Mary's University of Minnesota. Dietlin served as the president for the Michigan Young Democrats, and then was the legislative services specialist for the Michigan State University Senate from 1986-1991.

== Career ==
At Michigan Technological University, Dietlin served as Associate Director of Corporate Relations, Director of Major Gifts and Senior Advancement Director. She moved to Chicago in 1998 and worked as Assistant Dean of Development at University of Illinois at Chicago and an adjunct professor at North Park University. Lisa currently serves as a full time faculty member at DePaul University in its School of Public Service teaching multiple courses including The Business of Philanthropy a GLE + (Global Learning Experience, Plus) course. This course was developed with colleagues from Nottingham Trent University/Nottingham Business School. In 2023, its first year, this course was recognized by the UN Global Forum PRME.

In 2023, Lisa Dietlin was named as a Fulbright Specialist by the US Department of State. This is a three year appointment. In August 2023, she was deployed to Ashgabat, Turkmenistan, on her Fulbright Specialist assignment.

In 2000, Dietlin founded Lisa M. Dietlin & Associates, Inc. in Chicago, and served as president and CEO. LMDA worked to create philanthropic strategies for its clients, mainly entrepreneurs and non-profit organizations. Dietlin served on the Board of the Ms. Foundation and WomenOnCall.

Dietlin's first book, Transformational Philanthropy: Entrepreneurs and Nonprofits, was published in 2010. She later authored three more books, the Making A Difference series, which provides tips, ideas and stories about creating positive impact through giving. Two additional books authored by Lisa are The Power of Three: How to achieve your goals by simply doing three things a day and I Got Hit By a Taxi but You Look Run Over: Life Lessons about happiness and joy.

Dietlin was featured by the Chicago Tribune in their ebook Remarkable Women: Interviews with Inspiring Chicagoland Women In 2013 she was named one of the Top 50 Singles by Today's Chicago Woman magazine. She has also named as a SheSource expert on strategic fundraising, philanthropy, nonprofits, media and entertainment.

Dietlin has been a guest on many television and radio programs including NBC., CBS, Fox News, Better TV, WGN Radio, Oprah & Friends Radio NPR and First Business, giving information and ideas about how to get involved in charitable work. She appeared regularly on CBS 2 as its Chicago Charity Contributor, and was a national judge for the Tom’s of Maine "50 States for Good" charity recognition awards for several years. Dietlin has also contributed articles to, and been featured and quoted in various newspapers and magazines and in The Chronicle of Philanthropy. She has been a regular Huffington Post contributor through her blog "Making A Difference®: The World of Giving".

== Selected publications ==
=== Books ===
- Transformational Philanthropy: Entrepreneurs and Nonprofits 2010
- The Power of Three: How to achieve your goals by simply doing three things a day
- I Got Hit By a Taxi but You Look Run Over: Life Lessons about happiness and joy.
- Making A Difference - 365 Tips, Ideas and Stories to Change Your World.
- Making A Difference 2 - More Tips, Ideas and Stories to Change Your World.
- Making A Difference 3 - Still More Tips, Ideas and Stories to Change Your World.

=== Articles ===
- Conscious Magazine (February 2016) "Breaking Up The Winter Doldrums: Volunteer or Virtually Volunteer Options"
- University World News (2016) "Philanthropy For Social Leadership"
- HuffPost Blog Post (June 2015) "Making A Difference®: The World of Giving – US Charitable Giving Surpasses All Past Records in 2014"
- HuffPost Blog Post (November 2013) "Making A Difference®: The World of Giving – 50 STATES FOR GOOD" Announces Those Organizations Doing the Most Good
- HuffPost Blog Post (August 2012) "Making A Difference®: The World of Giving -- More Inspiration Right After the Olympics
- Today’s Chicago Woman (December 2011) "Women’s Role in Philanthropy"
