= Almira Township, Michigan =

- Civil township
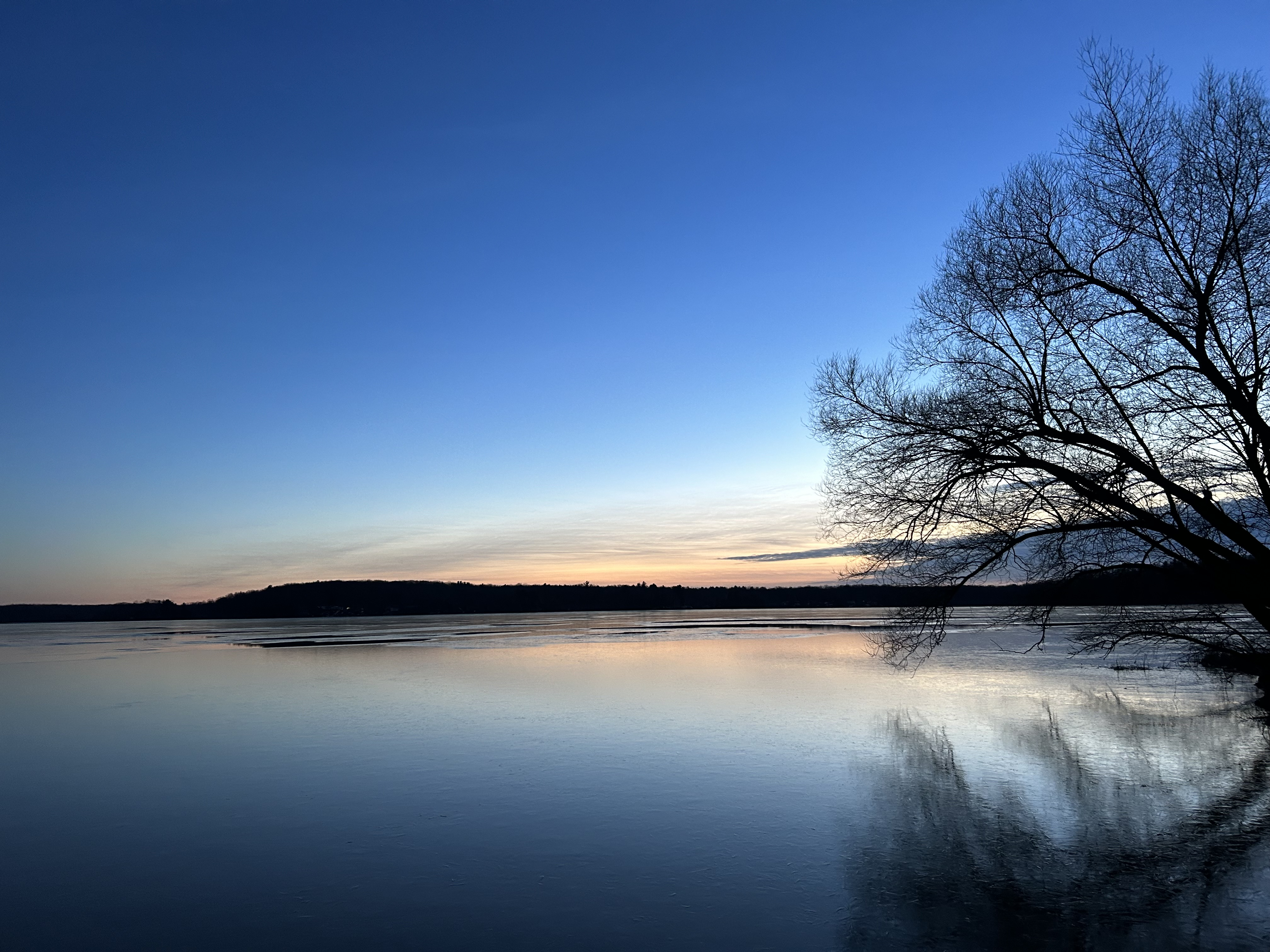
- View of the waterfront in Lake Ann

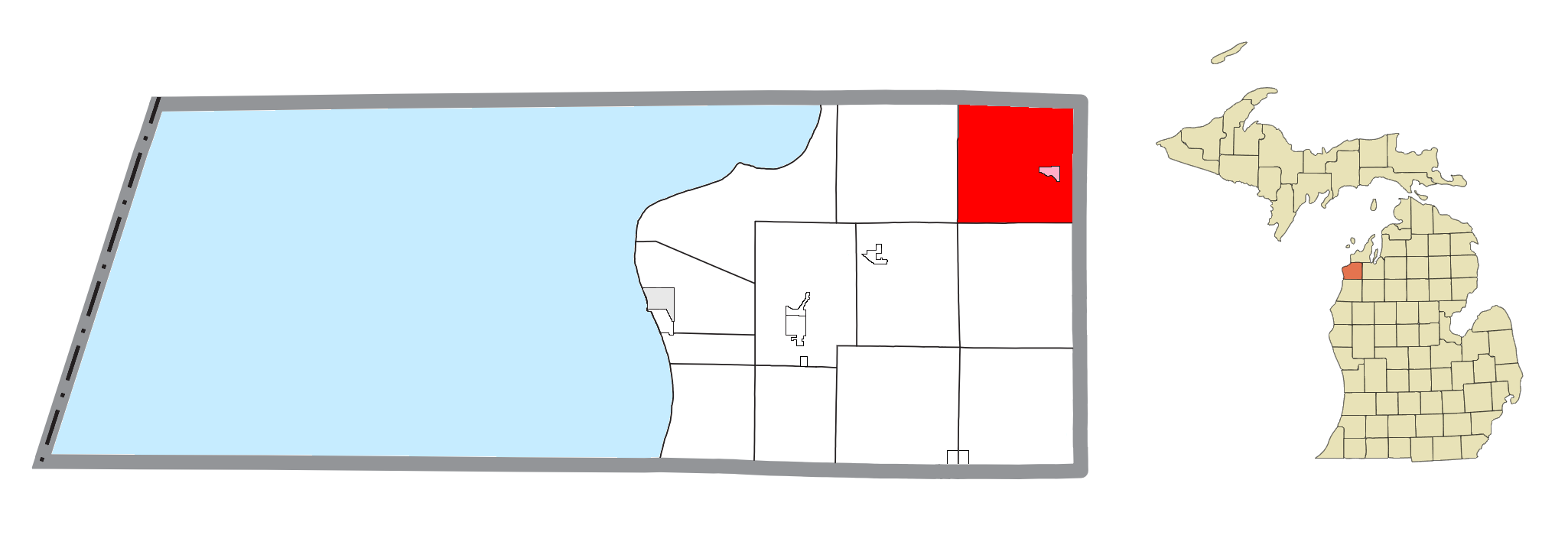
- Location within Benzie County (red) and the administered village of Lake Ann (pink)

- Location within the state of Michigan Almira Township (the United States)
- Coordinates: 44°43′42″N 85°51′24″W
- Country: United States
- State: Michigan
- County: Benzie
- Established: 1855

Government
  - Supervisor: Mark Roper

Area
  - Total: 36.0 sq mi (93.3 km^{2})
  - Land: 33.7 sq mi (87.4 km^{2})
  - Water: 2.3 sq mi (5.9 km^{2})
- Elevation: 873 ft (266 m)

Population (2020)
  - Total: 3,873
  - Density: 108/sq mi (41.7/km^{2})
- Time zone: UTC-5 (Eastern (EST))
  - Summer (DST): UTC-4 (EDT)
- ZIP code(s): 49630, 49643, 49650, 49664
- Area code: 231
- FIPS code: 26-01640
- GNIS feature ID: 1625829
- Website: Official website

Almira Township (/ælˈmaɪrə/ al-MY-rə) is a civil township in the northeast of Benzie County in the U.S. state of Michigan. As of the 2020 census, the township population was 3,873, making it the most-populous municipality in Benzie County.

== Name ==
Almira Township was named after the township's first female house-dwelling settler, Almira Burrell.

== Geography ==
According to the United States Census Bureau, the township has a total area of 36.0 square miles (93.3 km^{2}), of which 33.7 square miles (87.4 km^{2}) is land and 2.3 square miles (5.9 km^{2}), or 6.29%, is water.

Almira Township is about 8 miles (13 km) west of Traverse City, the largest city in Northern Michigan. Because of this proximity, residents of Almira Township and neighboring Inland Township are largely dependent on Traverse City.

The Platte River flows east to west through the township, originating in nearby Long Lake and flowing to Lake Michigan.

Almira Township contains no state trunkline highways, although US 31 and M-72 run east–west to the south and north of the township, respectively.

== Communities ==
- Hardwood Acres is a subdivision and census-designated place in eastern Almira Township, east of Lake Ann and on the border with Grand Traverse County.
- The village of Lake Ann is the most noteworthy settlement within Almira Township.
- Maple Grove is a small census-designated place within Almira Township.

== Demographics ==
As of the census of 2000, there were 2,811 people, 1,054 households, and 808 families residing in the township. The population density was 83.2 inhabitants per square mile (32.1/km^{2}). There were 1,320 housing units at an average density of 39.0 per square mile (15.1/km^{2}). The racial makeup of the township was 97.69% White, 0.21% African American, 0.60% Native American, 0.07% Asian, 0.25% from other races, and 1.17% from two or more races. Hispanic or Latino of any race were 1.14% of the population.

There were 1,054 households, out of which 38.8% had children under the age of 18 living with them, 65.9% were married couples living together, 7.7% had a female householder with no husband present, and 23.3% were non-families. 17.2% of all households were made up of individuals, and 5.2% had someone living alone who was 65 years of age or older. The average household size was 2.67 and the average family size was 3.03.

In the township the population was spread out, with 27.7% under the age of 18, 6.9% from 18 to 24, 33.5% from 25 to 44, 21.9% from 45 to 64, and 10.0% who were 65 years of age or older. The median age was 36 years. For every 100 females, there were 97.0 males. For every 100 females age 18 and over, there were 95.9 males.

The median income for a household in the township was $46,389, and the median income for a family was $49,024. Males had a median income of $33,164 versus $25,759 for females. The per capita income for the township was $20,137. About 3.3% of families and 4.0% of the population were below the poverty line, including 3.2% of those under age 18 and 1.4% of those age 65 or over.
