= Alpena Public Schools =

School district in Michigan

Address
- 2373 Gordon Road Alpena, Alpena County, Michigan; United States

District information
- Type: Public
- Grades: K–12
- Established: 1963
- Superintendent: David Rabbideau
- Schools: 9
- Budget: $61,263,000 2022-2023 expenditures
- NCES District ID: 2602730

Students and staff
- Students: 3,553 (2024-2025)
- Teachers: 212.35 FTE (2024-2025)
- Staff: 517.17 FTE (2024-2025)
- Student–teacher ratio: 16.73 (2024-2025)
- Athletic conference: Big North

Other information
- Website: www.alpenaschools.com

Alpena Public Schools is a public school district in the Alpena County, Michigan. It serves all of Alpena County, except for some western parts of Green Township and Wellington Township. In Presque Isle County, it serves Presque Isle Township and part of Krakow Township.

APS covers more than 600 square miles (1,600 km^{2}) and was officially established as Michigan's first county-wide school district in 1963.

== History ==
The first school building in Alpena was built in 1863. A union school district was established in the town in 1867, and the district built its school four years later. In 1883, the first class (of four students) graduated from the high school and the school board requested and gained accreditation from the University of Michigan.

Four buildings have served as Alpena High School:

- 1870: The first high school operated within the Union School building.
- 1891: Central High School was built, and additions were added in the 1920s. The school burned down in 1940.
- 1942: The burned high school was replaced by a new building. Additions were added in 1952 and 1957. It became a junior high with the opening of the present high school, and has since been demolished.
- 1967: The present high school opened. Additions were added in 1998.

Alpena's school district once only served the City of Alpena. In 1957, Presque Isle Township joined the school district. Rural districts in the county consolidated with the School District of the City of Alpena in 1963 and the district gained its present name. In 1966, the current high school was built to accommodate the increased student population. It was designed by the architecture firm Tarapata and MacMahon Associates.

In October 1981, the district ran out of money and closed for about two weeks. That November, district voters approved a tax renewal but defeated a tax increase, allowing the district to reopen, but without many services such as buses. In April of 1982, voters recalled four of the seven school board members, and the remaining members requested Governor William Milliken to appoint new members, which he did.

== Schools ==
=== High school (8–12) ===
School Name	Mascot	Address
Alpena High School	Wildcats	3303 South 3rd Street, Alpena, MI 49707

=== Junior high (6–8) ===
School Name	Mascot	Address
Thunder Bay Junior High School	Wildcats	3500 South 3rd Street, Alpena, MI 49707

=== Elementary schools (K–5) ===
School Name	Opened	Mascot	Address
Besser Elementary School	1986	Bulldogs	375 Wilson Street, Alpena, MI 49707
Ella White Elementary School	1950	Eagles	201 N. Ripley Boulevard, Alpena, MI 49707
Hinks Elementary School	1952	Hawks	7667 US 23, Alpena, MI 49707
Lincoln Elementary School		Lions	309 W. Lake Street, Alpena, MI 49707
Sanborn Elementary School	1963	Wolves	12170 US 23, Ossineke, MI 49766
Wilson Elementary School	1957	Wildcats	4999 Herron Road, Herron, MI 49744

=== Alternative school (7–12) ===
School Name	Address
ACES Academy	3303 South 3rd Street, Alpena, MI 49707

==== Closed elementary schools ====
School Name	Closed	Address
Bingham School	1982	555 South 5th Avenue, Alpena, MI 49707
Hubbard Lake Elementary School	2004	6891 Nicholson Hill Road, Hubbard Lake, MI 49747
Long Rapids Elementary School	2010	12595 Long Rapids Road, Lachine, MI 49753
Maple Ridge Elementary School	2004	7065 Dietz Road, Alpena, MI 49707
Sunset Elementary School	2010	1241 Hobbs Drive, Alpena, MI 49707

== See also ==
- List of school districts in Michigan
