= Lake Ann, Michigan =

- Village
- Village of Lake Ann
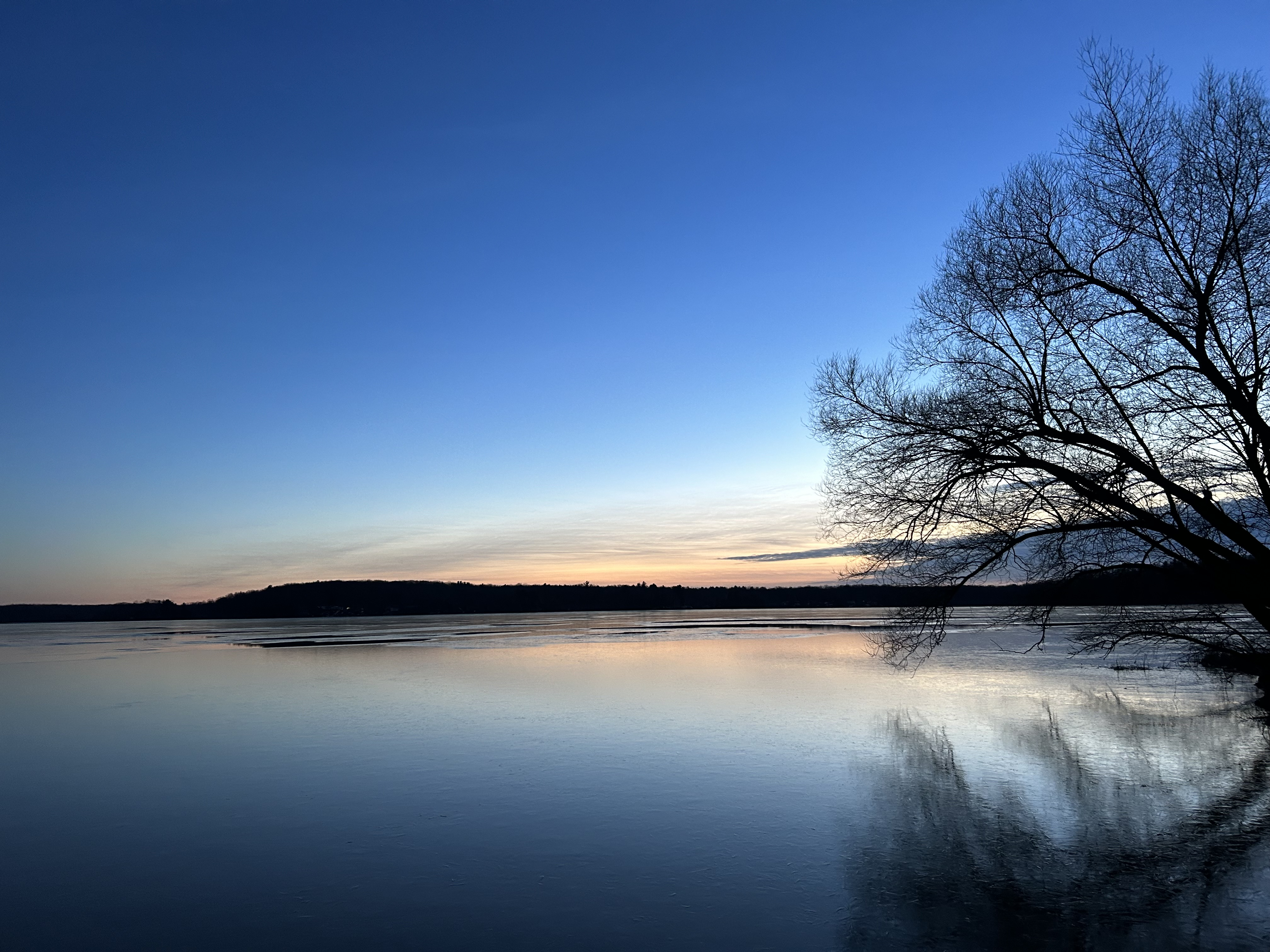
- Lake Ann waterfront at dusk, from Lakefront Park
- Nickname: "L.A."
- Motto(s): "Small, but Friendly"
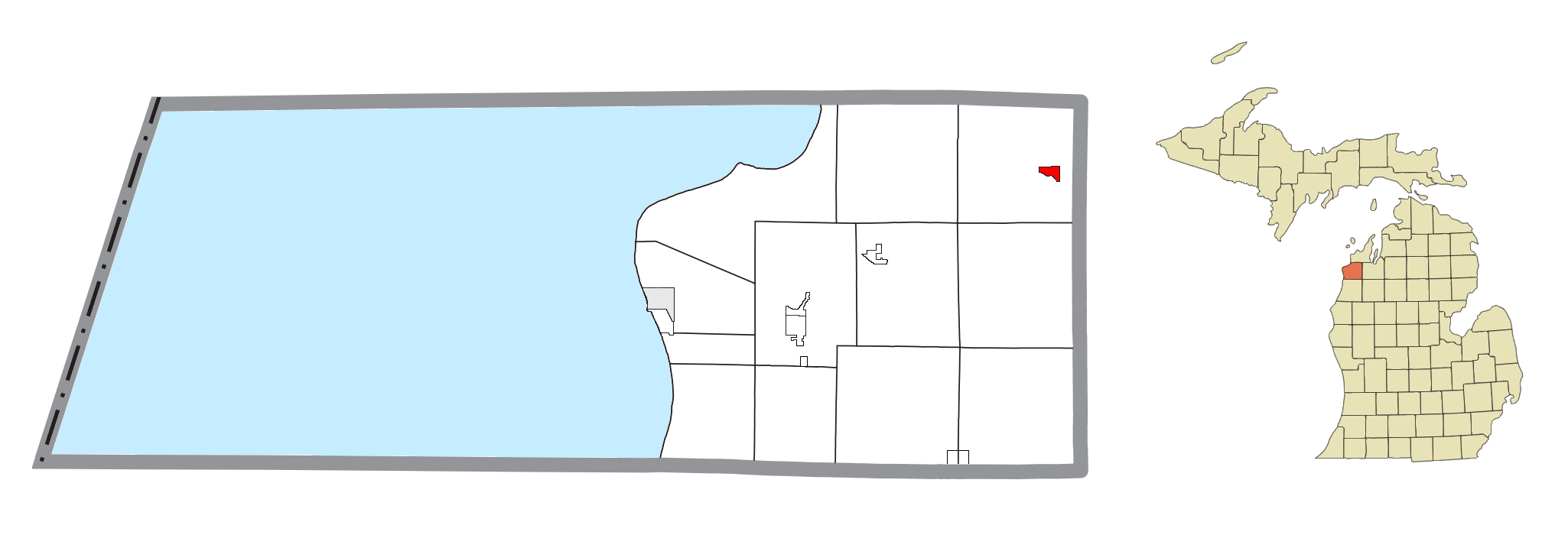
- Location within Benzie County

- Location within the state of Michigan
- Coordinates: 44°43′29″N 85°50′53″W
- Country: United States
- State: Michigan
- County: Benzie
- Township: Almira
- Established: 1864
- Organized: 1893
- Incorporated: 1914

Government
  - President: Dan Hawkins

Area
  - Total: 0.48 sq mi (1.24 km^{2})
  - Land: 0.45 sq mi (1.16 km^{2})
  - Water: 0.031 sq mi (0.08 km^{2})
- Elevation: 827 ft (252 m)

Population (2020)
  - Total: 273
  - Density: 607.9/sq mi (234.72/km^{2})
- Time zone: UTC-5 (Eastern (EST))
  - Summer (DST): UTC-4 (EDT)
- ZIP code(s): 49650
- Area code: 231
- FIPS code: 26-44460
- GNIS feature ID: 0629963
- Website: Official website

Lake Ann is a village in northeastern Benzie County in the U.S. state of Michigan. Part of Almira Township, Lake Ann is situated 10 miles (16 km) west of Traverse City, and largely dependent upon that city. The population of Lake Ann was 273 at the 2020 census.

== History ==
The first family to settle on Lake Ann was the family of Addison P. Wheelock, who name the lake after his wife.

Lake Ann was organized in 1893, and incorporated in 1914. It was once a station on the Manistee and North-Eastern Railroad, which has since been removed.

The Lake Ann Camp, a Christian summer camp, was established just west of Lake Ann in 1948.

== Geography ==
According to the United States Census Bureau, the village has a total area of 0.48 square miles (1.24 km^{2}), of which 0.45 square miles (1.17 km^{2}) is land and 0.03 square miles (0.08 km^{2}) is water.

Lake Ann lies upon the northern shore of the lake of the same name. Lake Ann itself is a basin that lies along the Platte River, which flows west to Lake Michigan.

Lake Ann contains no state trunkline highways, although Benzie County signs County Roads 610 (Maple Street), 665 (Lake Ann Road), and 667 (Reynolds Road) through the village.

== Demographics ==
Historical population
Census	Pop.	Note	%±
1900	241		—
1910	171		−29.0%
1920	67		−60.8%
1930	31		−53.7%
1940	37		19.4%
1950	99		167.6%
1960	106		7.1%
1970	172		62.3%
1980	235		36.6%
1990	217		−7.7%
2000	276		27.2%
2010	268		−2.9%
2020	273		1.9%
U.S. Decennial Census

=== 2010 census ===
As of the census of 2010, there were 268 people, 118 households, and 76 families residing in the village. The population density was 595.6 inhabitants per square mile (230.0/km^{2}). There were 174 housing units at an average density of 386.7 per square mile (149.3/km^{2}). The racial makeup of the village was 95.1% White, 0.4% African American, 1.5% Native American, 0.4% from other races, and 2.6% from two or more races. Hispanic or Latino of any race were 0.4% of the population.

There were 118 households, of which 22.0% had children under the age of 18 living with them, 59.3% were married couples living together, 4.2% had a female householder with no husband present, 0.8% had a male householder with no wife present, and 35.6% were non-families. 30.5% of all households were made up of individuals, and 7.6% had someone living alone who was 65 years of age or older. The average household size was 2.27 and the average family size was 2.80.

The median age in the village was 48.2 years. 16.8% of residents were under the age of 18; 7.8% were between the ages of 18 and 24; 18.7% were from 25 to 44; 38% were from 45 to 64; and 18.7% were 65 years of age or older. The gender makeup of the village was 48.1% male and 51.9% female.

=== 2000 census ===
As of the census of 2000, there were 276 people, 113 households, and 81 families residing in the village. The population density was 632.9 inhabitants per square mile (244.4/km^{2}). There were 174 housing units at an average density of 399.0 per square mile (154.1/km^{2}). The racial makeup of the village was 97.46% White, 0.72% Native American, 0.36% Asian, 0.36% from other races, and 1.09% from two or more races. Hispanic or Latino of any race were 1.81% of the population.

There were 113 households, out of which 24.8% had children under the age of 18 living with them, 60.2% were married couples living together, 9.7% had a female householder with no husband present, and 28.3% were non-families. 22.1% of all households were made up of individuals, and 9.7% had someone living alone who was 65 years of age or older. The average household size was 2.44 and the average family size was 2.84.

In the village, the population was spread out, with 20.7% under the age of 18, 9.1% from 18 to 24, 26.8% from 25 to 44, 23.9% from 45 to 64, and 19.6% who were 65 years of age or older. The median age was 42 years. For every 100 females, there were 91.7 males. For every 100 females age 18 and over, there were 92.1 males.

The median income for a household in the village was $42,917, and the median income for a family was $46,944. Males had a median income of $31,563 versus $19,583 for females. The per capita income for the village was $17,387. None of the families and 4.8% of the population were living below the poverty line, including no under eighteens and 8.0% of those over 64.

== Education ==
The Lake Ann area is divided between the Benzie Central Schools and Traverse City Area Public Schools districts. The nearest public elementary school is Lake Ann Elementary School, part of the Benzie Central Schools district. However, the nearest public secondary school is Traverse City West Senior High School, which is part of the Traverse City Area Public Schools district.

== Government ==
The village president of Lake Ann is Dan Hawkins. The village is, as of 2023, governed by Hawkins, treasurer Mandy Gray-Rineer, clerk Tammy Clous, and trustees Jess Bocian, Vince Edwards, Christi Grant-Wagner, and Joe Harrison.
