= Thirlby Field =

Football stadium in Traverse City, Michigan

- Thirlby Field at Harry T. Running Stadium
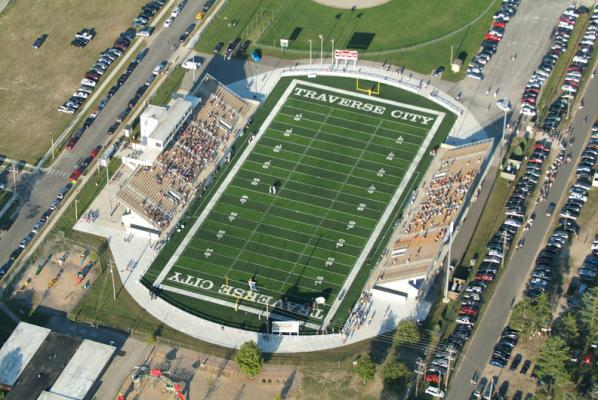
- Aerial view of Thirlby Field before a high school high school football game in 2020.
- Interactive map of Thirlby Field
- Location: 410 W. Thirteenth Street; Traverse City, Michigan 49684
- Coordinates: 44°45′10″N 85°37′40.5″W
- Owner: City of Traverse City
- Operator: TCAPS, GTACS
- Capacity: 7,000
- Surface: FieldTurf
- Scoreboard: Daktronics

Construction
- Opened: 1934
- Renovated: 1995, 2009

Tenants
- Traverse City Central Trojans (1896-present); St. Francis Gladiators (1950-present); Traverse City West Titans (1997-present)

Thirlby Field (/θɜːrəlbi/ THURR-əl-bee; officially Thirlby Field at Harry T. Running Stadium) is a 7,000-seat football stadium located in Traverse City, Michigan. It was built in 1934 on a site where football has been played since 1896 by the Traverse City Trojans. The stadium is where home football games are played for the Traverse City Central Trojans, Traverse City West Titans and St. Francis Gladiators.

== History ==
=== Original history ===
Thirlby Field originally ran north and south along Pine Street when play began in 1896. Mr. Thirlby, a local farmer gave the land to the Traverse City Schools for athletic contests. In the early years it was known as Thirlby's farm fields, or 12th Street Athletic Field.

The current configuration facing east and west was originally built in 1934 and was one of the first lighted athletic fields in Northern Michigan. It was then officially given the name "Thirlby Field" in honor of Dr. E.L. Thirlby, a relative of the farmer Thirlby and mayor of Traverse City in 1933 and 1934.

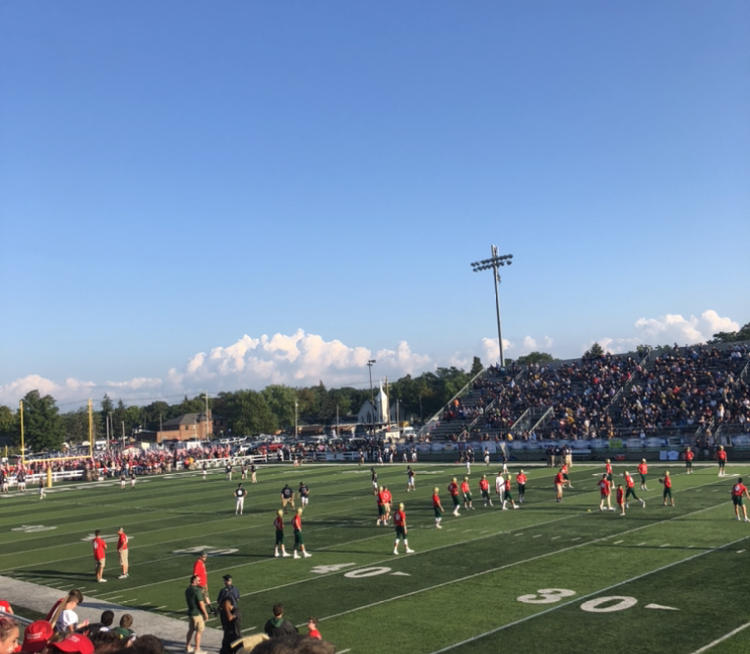
Thirlby Field on September 20, 2019, during the 8th annual Traverse City Patriot Game

=== Recent history ===
The stadium seated 5,000 until 1995 and is the only football stadium in Traverse City. Seating was then enlarged to approximately 7,000 at that time. Improvements to the stadium including the addition of locker rooms, public bathrooms, and an elevator to the press-box were made in 2009. While the stadium has a capacity of 7,000 it has hosted crowds of up to 12,000 for the annual TC Central/TC West football game. With portable field seating crowds of 15,000 might be accommodated.

The stadium received a new Daktronics scoreboard in 2021.
