= List of Michigan state parks =

Map showing state parks within the state of Michigan

This is a list of Michigan state parks and related protected areas under the jurisdiction or owned by the Michigan Department of Natural Resources (DNR) Parks and Recreation Division. A total of 113 state parks, state recreation areas, state scenic sites, and trail state parks currently exist along with six other sites as well as 16 state harbors on the Great Lakes. While the Parks and Recreation Division directly manages the large majority of the parks in the system, a few are either jointly-managed with other agencies or are leased to other governmental entities, either temporarily or on an ongoing basis. Michigan's 103 state parks and recreation areas cover 306,000 acres (124,000 ha) with 14,100 campsites in 142 campgrounds and over 900 miles (1,400 km) of trails. The state parks and recreation areas statewide collectively saw more than 26 million visits in 2016.

== History ==
Michigan's state parks system was started in 1919. Three Michigan state parks pre-date the creation of the park system in 1919: Mackinac Island State Park (1895), Michilimackinac State Park (1909) and Interlochen State Park (1917).

Mackinac Island State Park was created in 1895. It had served as the nation's second national park for two decades beginning in 1875. In 1909, Michilimackinac State Park was created in nearby Mackinaw City. Both of these parks, along with Dousman's Mill are under the jurisdiction of the Mackinac Island State Park Commission.

Interlochen State Park was purchased by the Michigan Legislature in 1917 and was the first public park to be transferred to the Michigan State Park Commission in 1920. Because Mackinac Island State Park was a federal gift with its own commission and jurisdiction, for those reasons some choose to not consider it the first state park even though it predates Interlochen State Park by nearly 25 years.

Since 1919, 36 additional state park units have been decommissioned for varied reasons. The majority of these former state park units, 17, were transferred to counties or cities and are still local parks today. Four of the former units were incorporated into Michigan's two National Lakeshores when were created in the 1960s and 70s, while five others were removed and reverted into surrounding state lands (state game areas, state forests, state fish hatcheries, etc.). Four of the units were incorporated into larger state recreation areas in the 1940s in the Greater Detroit area, although one of those recreation areas is now a local park. Two of the former state park units are now state forest campgrounds and another two units existed on state lands which were sold to private interests and closed. (The Former state park units section lists each of these former units.)

== Additional DNR facilities ==
DNR operates 746 boat launches on 57,000 acres (230 km^{2}) of designated public water access sites. It also operates 16 "harbors of refuge" as well as providing support for the other 61 harbors in the system. The harbors of refuge are approximately 30 miles (50 km) apart along the Great Lakes shoreline to provide shelter from storms and often provide boat launches and supplies. There are 13 state underwater preserves covering 2,450 square miles (6,300 km^{2}) of Great Lakes bottomland and ten of them have a maritime museum or interpretive center in a nearby coastal community.

The DNR Parks and Recreation Division also manages 138 state forest campgrounds (including a dozen equestrian campgrounds). The Michigan state game and wildlife areas encompass more than 340,000 acres (1,400 km^{2}). DNR also oversees the trail systems in the state. This includes 880 miles (1,400 km) of non-motorized trails, 1,145 miles (1,800 km) of rail-trails, 3,193 miles (5,100 km) of off-road vehicle (ORV) routes and 6,216 miles (10,000 km) of snowmobile trails.

== Michigan state parks ==
Name	County	Size		Estab- lished	Lake / river	Image	Remarks
Name	County	acres	ha	Estab- lished	Lake / river	Image	Remarks
Algonac State Park	St. Clair	1,550 acres	630 ha	1937	St. Clair River		Rare savanna lands
Aloha State Park	Cheboygan	172 acres	70 ha	1923	Mullett Lake		On the Michigan Inland Waterway
Baraga State Park	Baraga	56 acres	23 ha	1922	Lake Superior		On Keweenaw Bay
Bay City State Park	Bay	2,389 acres	967 ha	1923	Lake Huron		On Saginaw Bay
Belle Isle Park	Wayne	982 acres	397 ha	2014 (Note: Established in 1845 as a Detroit City Park, established as a Michigan State Park in 2014 under a 30-year lease.)	Detroit River		Historic island park in Detroit
Bewabic State Park	Iron	315 acres	127 ha	1966 (Note: Established in 1923 as an Iron County Park, purchased by the State of Michigan in 1966.)	Fortune Lake		
Brimley State Park	Chippewa	100 acres	40 ha	1922	Lake Superior		On Whitefish Bay
Burt Lake State Park	Cheboygan	125 acres	51 ha	1920	Burt Lake		
Cambridge Junction Historic State Park	Lenawee	80 acres	32 ha	1965	--		Historic Walker Tavern
Cheboygan State Park	Cheboygan	1,250 acres	510 ha	1962	Lake Huron		
Clear Lake State Park	Montmorency	290 acres	120 ha	1966	Clear Lake		
Coldwater Lake State Park	Branch	400 acres	160 ha	1987	Coldwater Lake		
Craig Lake State Park	Baraga, Marquette	9,732 acres	3,938 ha	1967	Craig Lake		Protects a large wilderness area formerly owned by Frederick Miller. 7 miles of the North Country Trail run through the park.
Dodge No. 4 State Park	Oakland	139 acres	56 ha	1922	Cass Lake		
Dousman's Mill	Cheboygan	625 acres	253 ha	1978	Near Lake Huron		Formerly known as Historic Mill Creek State Park and Old Mill Creek State Historic Park.
Duck Lake State Park	Muskegon	728 acres	295 ha	1974	Duck Lake		
Fayette Historic State Park	Delta	850 acres	340 ha	1959	Big Bay de Noc, Lake Michigan		
Flint State Park	Genesee	230 acres		2022	Flint River, Swartz Creek		Officially anounced in March 2022. Construction planned to finish in 2028.
Fisherman's Island State Park	Charlevoix	2,678 acres	1,084 ha	1975	Lake Michigan		
Fort Wilkins Historic State Park	Keweenaw	987 acres	399 ha	1923	Lake Superior		Site of Copper Harbor Light
Gete Mino Mshkiigan State Park	Cheboygan	147 acres	59 ha	2013	Mullett Lake		Undeveloped state park.
Grand Haven State Park	Ottawa	48 acres	19 ha	1920	Lake Michigan		
Grand Mere State Park	Berrien	1,100 acres	450 ha	1973	Lake Michigan		
Harrisville State Park	Alcona	107 acres	43 ha	1920	Lake Huron		
Hartwick Pines State Park	Crawford	9,338 acres	3,779 ha	1927	East Branch Au Sable River		Old-growth white and red pine forest
Hayes State Park	Lenawee, Jackson, Washtenaw	654 acres	265 ha	1920	Wamplers Lake, Round Lake		
Hoeft State Park	Presque Isle	301 acres	122 ha	1920	Lake Huron		
Hoffmaster State Park	Muskegon, Ottawa	1,200 acres	490 ha	1963	Lake Michigan		
Holland State Park	Ottawa	142 acres	57 ha	1926	Lake Macatawa, Lake Michigan		
Indian Lake State Park	Schoolcraft	567 acres	229 ha	1932	Indian Lake		
Interlochen State Park	Grand Traverse	187 acres	76 ha	1917	Green Lake, Duck Lake		First state park created under Michigan state parks system
Keith J. Charters Traverse City State Park	Grand Traverse	75 acres	30 ha	1920	Lake Michigan		On Grand Traverse Bay
Lake Gogebic State Park	Gogebic	360 acres	150 ha	1926	Lake Gogebic		
Lakeport State Park	St. Clair	565 acres	229 ha	1938	Lake Huron		
Laughing Whitefish Falls State Park	Alger	971 acres	393 ha	1946	Laughing Whitefish River		
Leelanau State Park	Leelanau	1,550 acres	630 ha	1964 (Note: The park was originally deeded to the State in 1932, however.)	Lake Michigan		
Ludington State Park	Mason	4,800 acres	1,900 ha	1927	Lake Michigan		
Mackinac Island State Park	Mackinac	1,800 acres	730 ha	1895 (Note: Established in 1875 as Mackinac Island National Park, deeded to the State of Michigan in 1895.)	Lake Huron		Formerly Mackinac National Park, transferred to the state of Michigan in 1895 to become its first state park. Home to historic Fort Mackinac.
Maybury State Park	Wayne	944 acres	382 ha	1971	--		
McLain State Park	Houghton	443 acres	179 ha	1930	Lake Superior		
Mears State Park	Oceana	50 acres	20 ha	1920	Lake Michigan		
Meridian-Baseline State Park	Ingham, Jackson	108 acres	44 ha	1967	Shaw Branch		
Fort Michilimackinac State Park	Emmet, Cheboygan	37 acres	15 ha	1904	Straits of Mackinac		Includes Colonial Michilimackinac and Old Mackinac Point Lighthouse
Mitchell State Park	Wexford	660 acres	270 ha	1920	Lake Mitchell, Lake Cadillac		
Muskallonge Lake State Park	Luce	217 acres	88 ha	1956	Lake Superior		
Muskegon State Park	Muskegon	1,233 acres	499 ha	1923	Lake Michigan, Muskegon Lake		
Negwegon State Park	Alcona, Alpena	4,118 acres	1,666 ha	1962	Lake Huron		
Newaygo State Park	Newaygo	400 acres	160 ha	1966	Hardy Dam Pond		
North Higgins Lake State Park	Crawford	449 acres	182 ha	1965	Higgins Lake		
Old Mission State Park	Grand Traverse	520 acres	210 ha	1989 (Note: The park was originally deeded to the State in 1932, however.)	Lake Michigan		Leased to Peninsula Township and operated as Lighthouse Park
Onaway State Park	Presque Isle	158 acres	64 ha	1920	Black Lake		
Orchard Beach State Park	Manistee	201 acres	81 ha	1921	Lake Michigan		
Otsego Lake State Park	Otsego	62 acres	25 ha	1920	Otsego Lake		
Palms Book State Park	Schoolcraft	388 acres	157 ha	1929	Kitch-iti-kipi, Indian Lake		Home to Kitch-iti-kipi, Michigan's largest natural freshwater spring.
Petoskey State Park	Emmet	303 acres	123 ha	1961	Little Traverse Bay		
Porcupine Mountains Wilderness State Park	Gogebic, Ontonagon	59,020 acres	23,880 ha	1944	Lake Superior, Lake of the Clouds		The largest park in the system, protects a large swath of old growth northern hardwood forest area.
Port Crescent State Park	Huron	640 acres	260 ha	1955	Lake Huron		
Sanilac Petroglyphs Historic State Park	Sanilac	240 acres	97 ha	1971	Little Cass River		
Saugatuck Dunes State Park	Allegan	1,000 acres	400 ha	1977	Lake Michigan		
Seven Lakes State Park	Oakland	1,434 acres	580 ha	1971	Big Seven Lake		
Silver Lake State Park	Oceana	2,936 acres	1,188 ha	1920	Lake Michigan, Silver Lake		Includes Little Sable Point Light
Sleeper State Park	Huron	723 acres	293 ha	1924	Lake Huron		
Sleepy Hollow State Park	Clinton	2,678 acres	1,084 ha	1965	Lake Ovid		
South Higgins Lake State Park	Roscommon	1,364 acres	552 ha	1924	Higgins Lake		
Sterling State Park	Monroe	1,300 acres	530 ha	1935	Lake Erie		
Straits State Park	Mackinac	181 acres	73 ha	1924	Straits of Mackinac		Includes Father Marquette National Memorial
Sturgeon Point State Park	Alcona	76 acres	31 ha	1960	Lake Michigan		
Tahquamenon Falls State Park	Chippewa, Luce	46,179 acres	18,688 ha	1947	Tahquamenon River		Surrounds a portion of the Tahquamenon River emptying into Lake Superior, including the Tahquamenon Falls, a set of large waterfalls with a unique brown color.
Tawas Point State Park	Iosco	183 acres	74 ha	1960	Lake Huron		
Thompson's Harbor State Park	Presque Isle	5,109 acres	2,068 ha	1988	Lake Huron		
Twin Lakes State Park	Houghton	175 acres	71 ha	1964	Lake Roland		
Van Buren State Park	Van Buren	400 acres	160 ha	1966	Lake Michigan		
Van Riper State Park	Marquette	1,100 acres	450 ha	1956	Lake Michigamme		
Warren Dunes State Park	Berrien	1,500 acres	610 ha	1930	Lake Michigan		
Warren Woods State Park	Berrien	311 acres	126 ha	1949	Galien River		
Watkins Lake State Park and County Preserve	Washtenaw	1,122 acres	454 ha	2016	Watkins Lake		
Wells State Park	Menominee	700 acres	280 ha	1925	Lake Michigan		On Green Bay
Wilderness State Park	Emmet	12,800 acres	5,200 ha	1927	Lake Michigan		
William G. Milliken State Park and Harbor	Wayne	31 acres	13 ha	2004	Detroit River		
Wilson State Park	Clare	36 acres	15 ha	1920	Budd Lake		
Young State Park	Charlevoix	563 acres	228 ha	1920	Lake Charlevoix		

== Michigan state recreation areas ==
Name	County	Size		Estab- lished	Lake / river	Image	Remarks
Name	County	acres	ha	Estab- lished	Lake / river	Image	Remarks
Bald Mountain State Recreation Area	Oakland	4,637 acres	1,877 ha	1944	Lower Trout Lake, others		Water Warrior Island waterpark
Bass River State Recreation Area	Ottawa	1,665 acres	674 ha	1994	Grand River		
Brighton State Recreation Area	Livingston	4,947 acres	2,002 ha	1944	Bishop Lake, others		
Fort Custer State Recreation Area	Kalamazoo	3,033 acres	1,227 ha	1971	Eagle, Jackson and Whitford-Lawler Lakes		
Highland State Recreation Area	Oakland	5,900 acres	2,400 ha	1944	Haven Hill, Temple, Moore Lakes and others		
Holly State Recreation Area	Oakland	7,817 acres	3,163 ha	1944	Heron, Valley, and McGinnis Lakes		
Ionia State Recreation Area	Ionia	4,500 acres	1,800 ha	1965	Grand River		
Island Lake State Recreation Area	Livingston	4,000 acres	1,600 ha	1944	Huron River, Island Lake		Hot-air balloon launch area
Lake Hudson State Recreation Area	Lenawee	2,796 acres	1,132 ha	1979	Lake Hudson		First-ever Dark-Sky Preserve designated, 1993
Lime Island State Recreation Area	Chippewa	980 acres	400 ha	2011	St. Marys River		Visitors provide own transportation to remote island; six rental cabins; Victorian House/Museum
Menominee River State Recreation Area	Dickinson, Menominee	2,879 acres	1,165 ha	2012	Menominee River		Co-managed with Wisconsin's Menominee River State Park and Recreation Area
Metamora-Hadley State Recreation Area	Lapeer	723 acres	293 ha	1944	Minnewanna Lake		
Ortonville State Recreation Area	Lapeer, Oakland	5,400 acres	2,200 ha	1944	Big Fish and Davison Lakes		
Pinckney State Recreation Area	Livingston, Washtenaw	11,000 acres	4,500 ha	1944	Numerous inland lakes		
Pontiac Lake State Recreation Area	Oakland	3,745 acres	1,516 ha	1944	Huron River, Pontiac Lake		
Proud Lake State Recreation Area	Oakland	3,030 acres	1,230 ha	1944	Huron River, Proud Lake		
Rifle River State Recreation Area	Ogemaw	4,449 acres	1,800 ha	1963	Rifle River		
Rockport State Recreation Area	Alpena, Presque Isle	4,237 acres	1,715 ha	2012	Lake Huron		Contains old limestone quarry and Besser Natural Area
Tippy Dam State Recreation Area	Manistee	117 acres	47 ha	2007	Manistee River		Managed under a lease agreement with Consumers Energy.
Waterloo State Recreation Area	Jackson, Washtenaw	20,125 acres	8,144 ha	1943	Numerous inland lakes		Third largest unit in the system.
W.C. Wetzel State Recreation Area	Macomb	913 acres	369 ha	1969	Coon Creek		
Yankee Springs State Recreation Area	Barry	5,200 acres	2,100 ha	1943	Gun Lake		

Michigan state recreation areas (clickable map)

== Michigan trail state parks ==
The following state trails are units of the State Park System. Several other state trails fall under Department of Natural Resources jurisdiction and/or maintenance, but are not state park units and are not included here.

Name	Official name	Counties	Length		Estab- lished	Image	Remarks
Name	Official name	Counties	mi	km	Estab- lished	Image	Remarks
Hart-Montague Trail State Park	William Field Memorial Hart-Montague Trail State Park	Muskegon, Oceana	22	35	1988		Converted rail-trail
Kal-Haven Trail	Kal-Haven Bicycle Trail Sesquicentennial State Park	Kalamazoo, Van Buren	34.5	55.5	1988	Trail through woods.	Converted rail-trail
Lakelands Trail State Park	Mike Levine Lakelands Trail State Park	Ingham, Livingston, Washtenaw	26	42	1991	Sign, car park, and station.	Converted rail-trail
Van Buren Trail State Park		Van Buren	14	23	1994		Converted rail-trail
White Pine Trail State Park	Fred Meijer White Pine Trail State Park	Kent, Mecosta, Montcalm, Osceola, Wexford	92	148	1996	Little Muskegon River from trail bridge in Morley, Michigan.	Converted rail-trail

== Michigan state scenic sites ==
State Scenic Sites are, in essence, miniature state parks with limited facilities and administered by other nearby state parks. Laughing Whitefish Falls State Park was formerly a State Scenic Site, but has since been upgraded to full state park status.

Name	County	Size		Estab- lished	Hydrologic Feature(s)	Image	Remarks
Name	County	acres	ha	Estab- lished	Hydrologic Feature(s)	Image	Remarks
Agate Falls Scenic Site	Ontonagon	213 acres	86 ha	1992	Agate Falls		Adjacent to Agate Falls MDOT State Roadside Park. Administered by Baraga State Park.
Bond Falls Scenic Site	Ontonagon	90 acres	36 ha	1992	Bond Falls		DNR-managed facility on Upper Peninsula Power Company (UPPCO)-owned land. Administered by Baraga State Park.
Houghton-Douglass Falls Scenic Site	Houghton	115 acres	47 ha	2018	Houghton-Douglass Falls		Future State Scenic Site under development. Administered by F.J. McLain State Park.
Wagner Falls Scenic Site	Alger	23 acres	9.3 ha	1956	Wagner Falls		Administered by Indian Lake State Park.

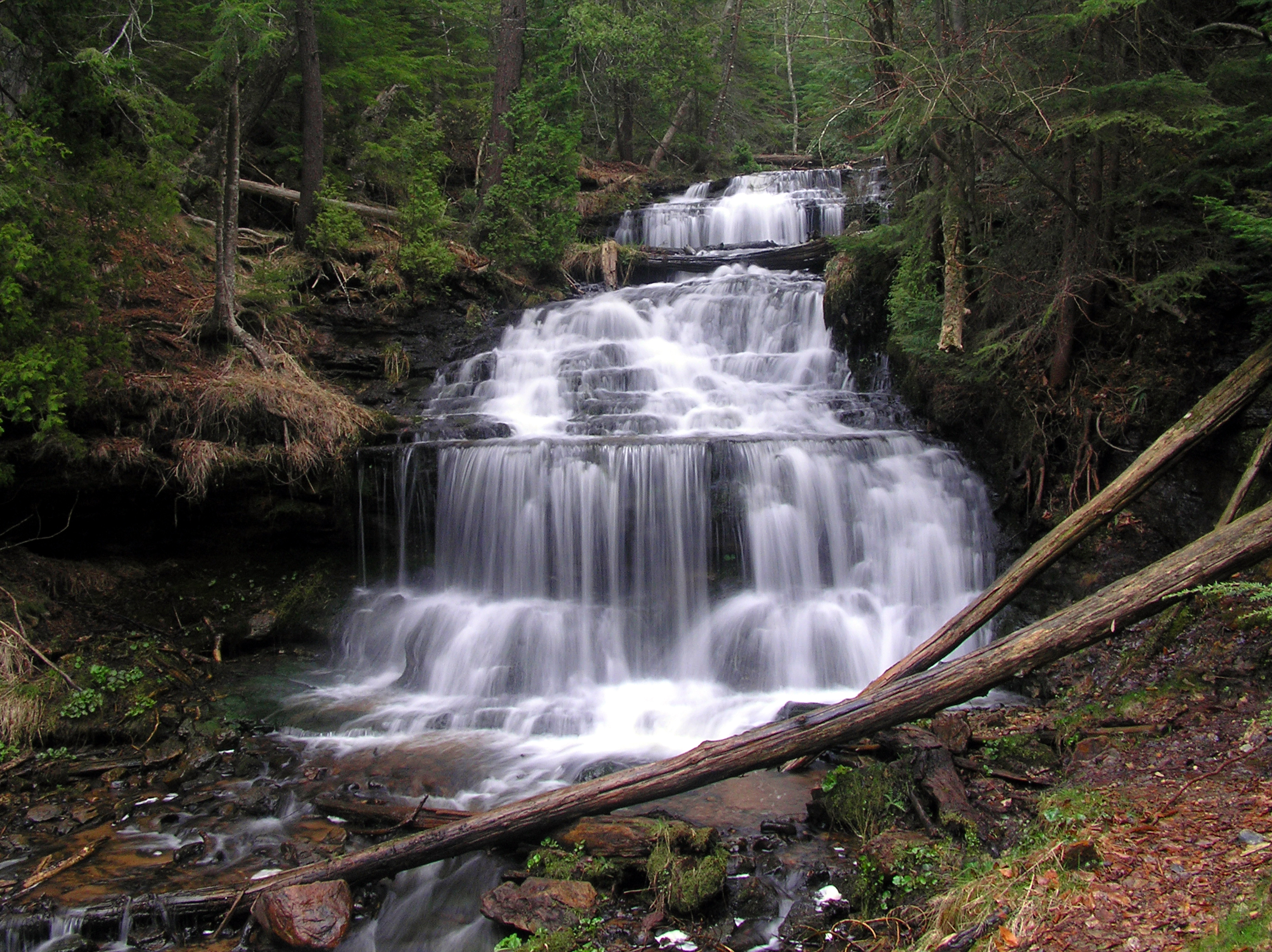
Wagner Falls

== Other sites ==
Name	County	Size		Estab- lished	Hydrologic Feature(s)	Image	Remarks
Name	County	acres	ha	Estab- lished	Hydrologic Feature(s)	Image	Remarks
DNR Pocket Park	Delta	1 acre	0.40 ha	1998	none		Within the Upper Peninsula State Fairgrounds in Escanaba featuring a fishing pond, archery and pellet gun ranges, a fire tower, a waterfall and a dozen specialty gardens. Open seasonally May through September.
Father Marquette National Memorial	Mackinac	58 acres	23 ha	1973	Straits of Mackinac (views)		Within the western portion of Straits State Park.
Holly Oaks ORV Park	Oakland	235 acres	95 ha	2021	none		Jointly-managed with Oakland County Parks.
Outdoor Adventure Center	Wayne	0.94 acres	0.38 ha	2015	Detroit River		In historic Globe Building, adjacent to William G. Milliken State Park and Harbor.
Ralph A. MacMullan Conference Center	Crawford	32 acres	13 ha	1941	Higgins Lake		Within North Higgins Lake State Park
Saginaw River Headwaters Recreation Area	Saginaw	334 acres	135 ha	2023	Saginaw River		DNR-owned park, managed by Saginaw County Parks.

== Former state park units ==
- Benzie State Park – (1929–1975) donated to the National Park Service in 1975 and is now the Platte River Campground of Sleeping Bear Dunes National Lakeshore
- Bloomer State Park No. 1 – (1922–late 1960s) 36 acres, absorbed into Proud Lake State Recreation Area; now Bloomer Park in West Bloomfield Township
- Bloomer State Park No. 2 – (1922–1945) 50 acres, originally Dodge Brothers State Park No. 7; incorporated into Rochester-Utica State Recreation Area, now Bloomer Park in Rochester Hills
- Bloomer State Park No. 3 – (1922–1944) 100 acres, later incorporated into Ortonville State Recreation Area, northeast of Ortonville
- Bloomer State Park No. 4 – (1922–1947), 28 acres, now Bloomer Park in White Lake Township, undeveloped site sold as it was "not of state park calibre" with funds used to purchased additional lands for the new Rochester-Utica State Recreation Area
- Cheboygan State Park – (c.1921–1945) 15 acres, original state park located on the site of the current Cheboygan County Fairground, originally known as O'Brien's Grove (not to be confused with present-day Cheboygan State Park)
- D.H. Day State Park – (1920–1975) later consolidated with nearby Sleeping Bear-Glen Lake State Park (1959); donated to the National Park Service in 1975 and is now the D.H. Day Campground of Sleeping Bear Dunes National Lakeshore
- Detour State Park – (1958– ) 403 acres, now Detour State Forest Campground in Lake Superior State Forest, west of De Tour Village
- Dodge Brothers State Park No. 1 – (1922–1944) 22 acres, name later changes to Island Lake Dodge Brothers No.1 State Park; incorporated into Island Lake State Recreation Area in 1944
- Dodge Brothers State Park No. 2 – (1922–1947) 26 acres, now Lakeshore Park in Novi
- Dodge Brothers State Park No. 3 – (1922– ) 13 acres, on Crescent Lake west of Pontiac, now Optimist Park, in Waterford.
- Dodge Brothers State Park No. 5 – (1922– ) 80 acres, now Dodge Park V in Commerce Township
- Dodge Brothers State Park No. 6 – (1922– ) 35 acres, now Beverly Park in Beverly Hills
- Dodge Brothers State Park No. 7 – (1922–1947) originally designated Dodge Brothers State Park No. 11, renamed to No. 7 when the original No. 7 became Bloomer State Park No. 2; 240 acres, now Horseshoe Lake State Game Area near Oxford
- Dodge Brothers State Park No. 8 – (1922–1973) 41.2 acres, now Dodge Park in Sterling Heights
- Dodge Brothers State Park No. 9 – (1922–1960) 30 acres, now Dodge Park in South Rockwood
- Dodge Brothers State Park No.10 – (1922–1944) 78 acres, incorporated into Highland State Recreation Area near Highland in 1944
- East Tawas State Park - (1921–1965) now East Tawas City Park in East Tawas
- Frank W. Fletcher State Park – (1920–c.1947) 160 acres, now Sunken Lake County Park northwest of Alpena
- Gladwin State Park – (1921–1982) 302 acres, now Gladwin City Park in Gladwin
- Grand Marais State Park - (1931–1966) incorporated into the easternmost portion of the Pictured Rocks National Lakeshore (Grand Sable Dunes Area)
- Hanson Military Reservation – (1920– ) southwest of Grayling, managed as a state park for recreation purposes, included the Grayling Winter Sports Park
- Lake City State Park – (1923–c.1947) at Lake City, now the Missaukee County Park
- T. K. Lawless State Park – (August 21, 1974–July 24, 1980) a 600-acre park consisting of the property of the late Chicago physician Theodore K. Lawless purchased by the State for $100,000 after his death, but never fully developed due to a lack of funds. Sold to Cass County for $1.00 in 1980 to be used as a county park, which it remains to this day.
- Magnus State Park (1922–1949) – 16 acres, now Magnus City Park in Petoskey
- Marquette State Park – (1923–1947) Not operated in the 1946 season, deeded back to the City of Marquette in 1947. Now a subdivision of homes west of Marquette.
- Munuskong State Park – (1925–c.1940s) a Dodge Brothers state park on Munuscong Bay northeast of Pickford, now part of the Munuscong State Wildlife Management Area
- Paw Paw State Park – (c.1921–1926) in Paw Paw on Maple Lake. Park turned back to the City of Paw Paw in spring 1926.
- Pere Marquette River State Park – (1927–c.1940s) four sites—33, 12, 77 and 189 acres, respectively, along the Pere Marquette River in Mason County
- Pictured Rocks State Park – (1931–1966) Originated with the gift to the state of 27 acres around Miners Castle from Alger County in 1931, later incorporated into the westernmost portion of the Pictured Rocks National Lakeshore in 1966.
- Rochester-Utica State Recreation Area (originally Bloomer State Park No.2) – (1945–1992) a portion was also part of Spring Hill Farm, the country estate of boxer Joe Louis, (1939–1944); now Bloomer City Park (Rochester Hills) and River Bends Park (Shelby Township)
- Saint Clair (County) State Park – (1926–1949) 17 acres, former St. Clair County Park (1919–1926) gifted to the state; abandoned as a state park in 1949 due to the proximity of nearby Port Huron (Lakeport) State Park and given its small size; deeded to township and is now Burtchville Township Park.
- Sidnaw State Park – (November 21, 1931–c.1935) 1,500 acres, formed from the Sidnaw Fish Hatchery lands near Sidnaw
- Sleeping Bear-Glen Lake State Park – (June 1946–1959) 2,044 acres (5,800 acres in proposed park boundary), centered on state lands received from the federal government in the Sleeping Bear Dunes area, later consolidated with D.H. Day State Park (1959); donated to the National Park Service in 1975 and is now part of the Sleeping Bear Dunes National Lakeshore
- Van Etten Lake State Park – (1928–January 1944) now Van Etten Lake State Forest Campground near Oscoda. Removed from state park system so timber in the park could be harvested for the war effort during World War II.
- White Cloud State Park – (1921–January 27, 1983) now White Cloud City Park in White Cloud

== Michigan state forests ==
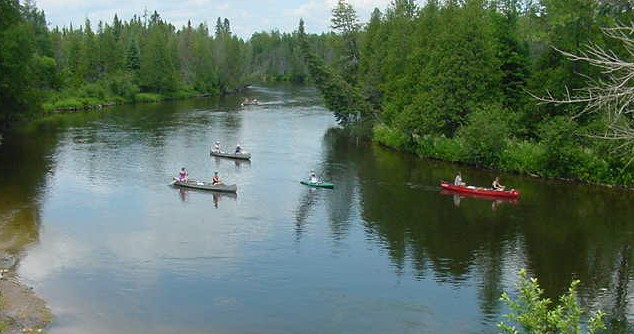
The Au Sable River runs through the Au Sable State Forest

Michigan's state forest system is administered by the Forest Resources Division (FRD) within the Michigan Department of Natural Resources, not the Parks and Recreation Division (PRD) which manages the state park system, however the Parks and Recreation Division took over the recreation responsibilities of the Forest Resources Division (e.g. the state forest campgrounds and the trails and pathways within the state forests) in January 2012.

- Au Sable State Forest
- Copper Country State Forest
- Escanaba River State Forest
- Lake Superior State Forest
- Mackinaw State Forest
- Pere Marquette State Forest
