= Coldwater Lake =

Coldwater Lake may refer to:

- Coldwater Lake (Washington), a lake formed in the 1980 eruption of Mount St. Helens
- Coldwater Lake (Michigan), a lake in south-central Michigan
  - Coldwater Lake State Park, an undeveloped public recreation area on the shore of the lake in Michigan
