= Negwegon =

Negwegon may refer to:

- Alcona County, Michigan, named Negwegon County from 1840 to 1843
- Negwegon State Park, a park in Michigan
