= Negwegon State Park =

Park in Michigan, USA

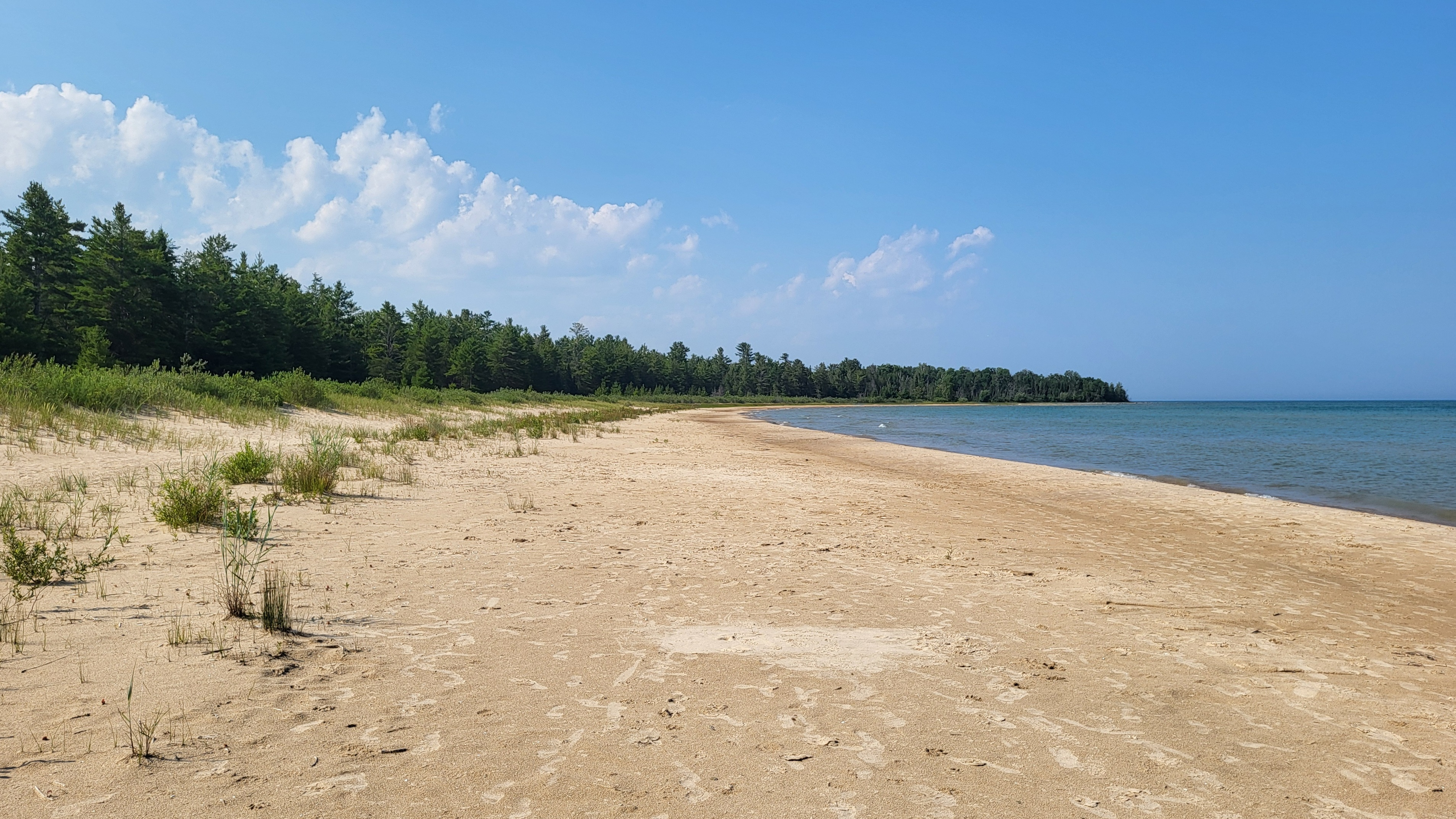
- Beachfront along Lake Huron

- Location within Michigan Location within the United States
- Location: Alpena and Alcona counties, Michigan, United States
- Nearest city: Alpena, Michigan
- Coordinates: 44°51′22″N 83°19′37″W
- Area: 4,118 acres (1,666 ha)
- Elevation: 591 feet (180 m)
- Established: 1962
- Administrator: Michigan Department of Natural Resources
- Designation: Michigan state park
- Website: Official website

Negwegon State Park is an undeveloped public recreation area on Lake Huron lying five miles (8.0 km) southeast of the unincorporated community of Ossineke in Alpena County and Alcona County, Michigan. The state park's 4,118 acres (1,666 ha) occupy the southern tip of Thunder Bay, fourteen miles (23 km) across the water from the city of Alpena. The park includes lowland areas with small ridges, mature pine forest, open meadows, and a long sand beach. It is administered by the Michigan Department of Natural Resources with support from the volunteer "Friends of Negwegon."

== History ==
Archaic period fishing grounds have been found in the vicinity of Negewegon State Park from about 6000-4000 BCE.

First purchase of land for the park, then known as Alpena State Park, occurred in 1962. Its name was changed in 1970 at the behest of the local citizenry who thought it appropriate for the park to honor the Ojibwe chieftain known to have hunted and camped in the area. In 2016, Negwegon State Park, Thompson's Harbor State Park, and Rockport State Park were designated as Michigan "dark sky preserves." The Besser Planetarium (from Alpena) hosts celestial viewing events from time to time at the park.

== Activities and amenities ==
The park offers 11 miles (18 km) of hiking trails, primitive camping sites, canoeing, and hunting. The sand road that cuts through the forest and leads to the entrance of the park may require a 4WD/All-wheel drive vehicle. At the boundary between private/county land and state land, the thin sand two-track road, Sand Hill Wilds Road, becomes a very wide groomed gravel road, Negwegon Park Road.

== Images ==
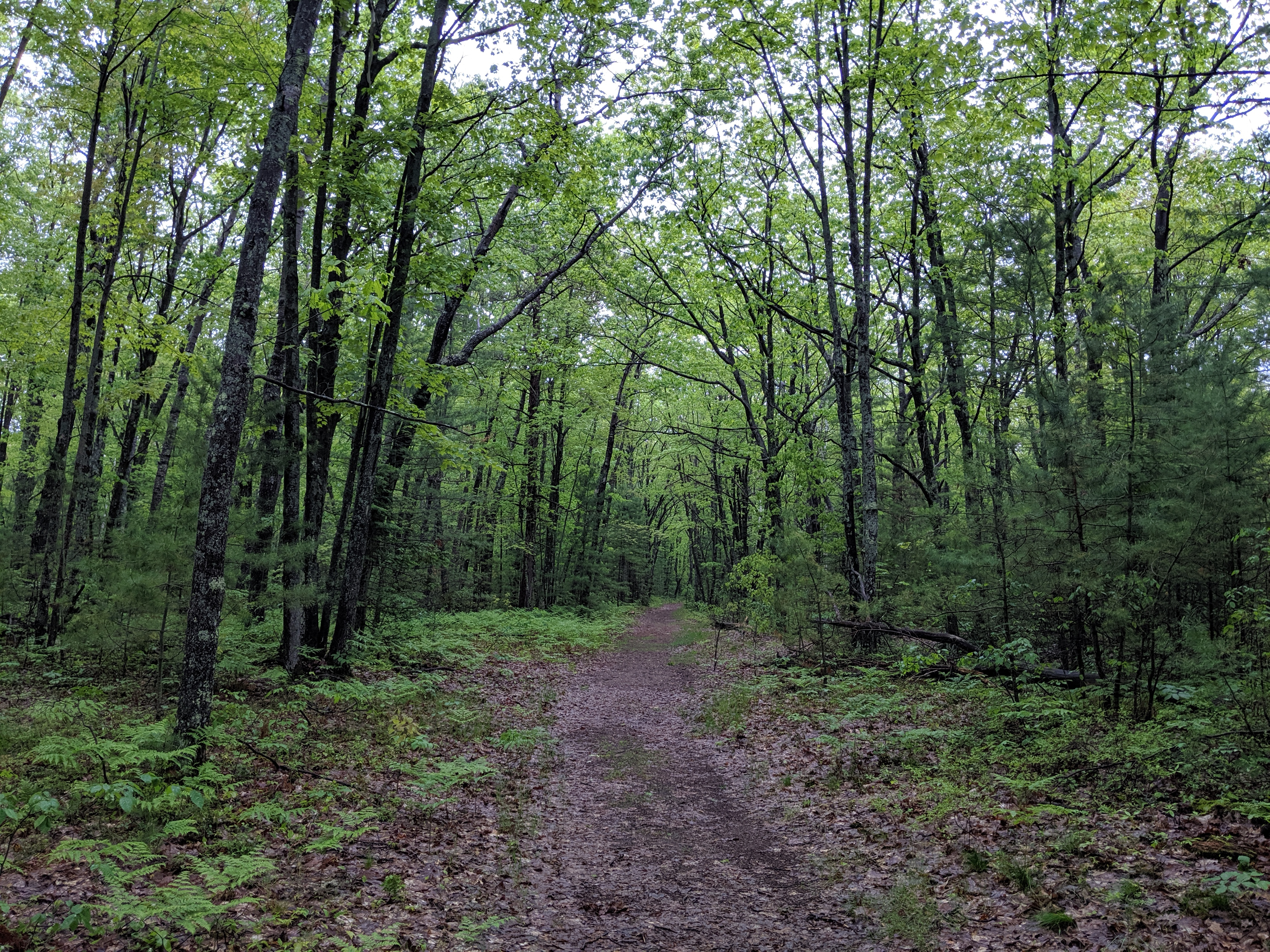
The main hiking trail out of the parking lot

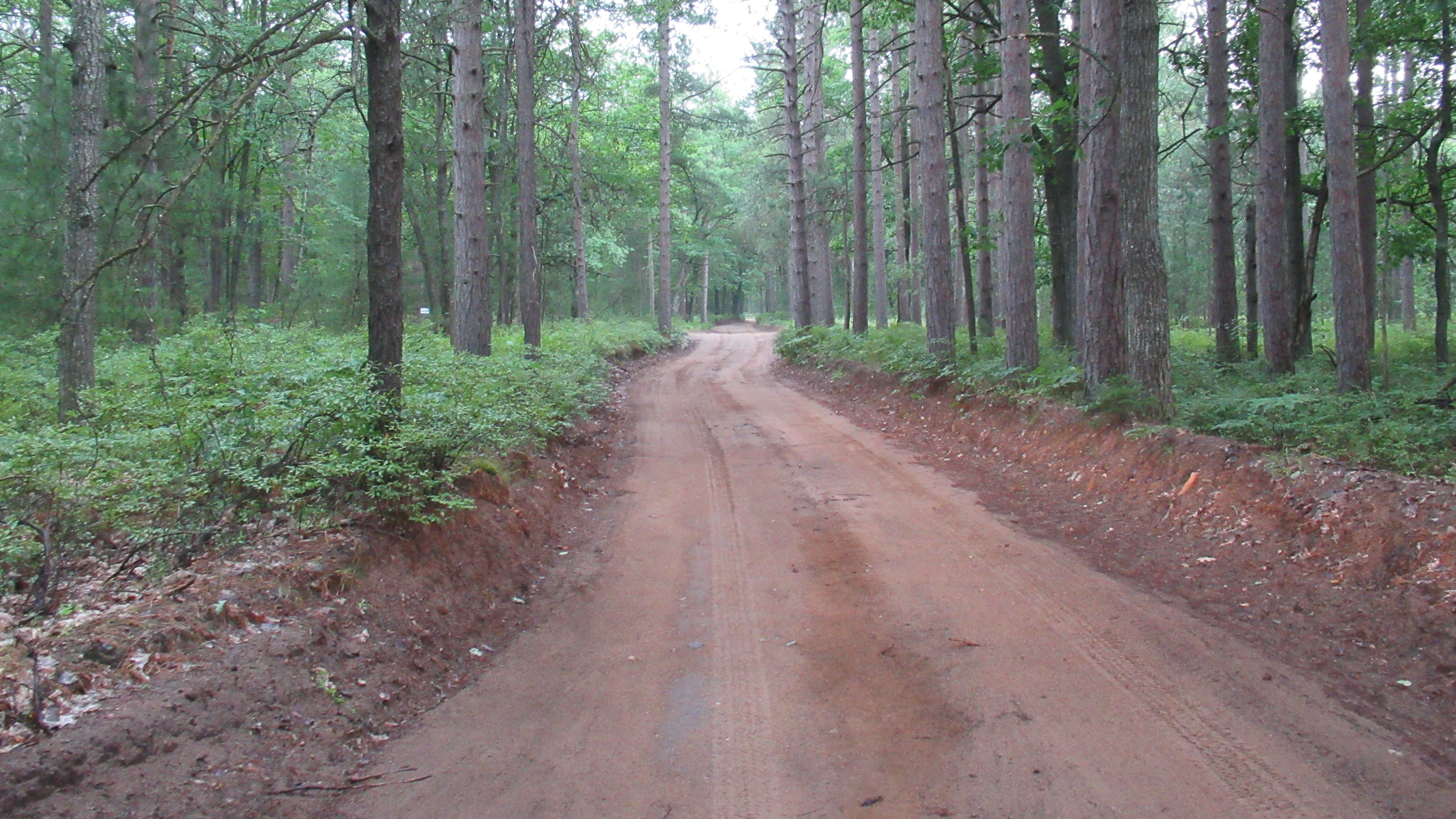
Sand Hill Trail leading to the park's entrance
