= Seven Lakes State Park =

Park in Michigan, United States

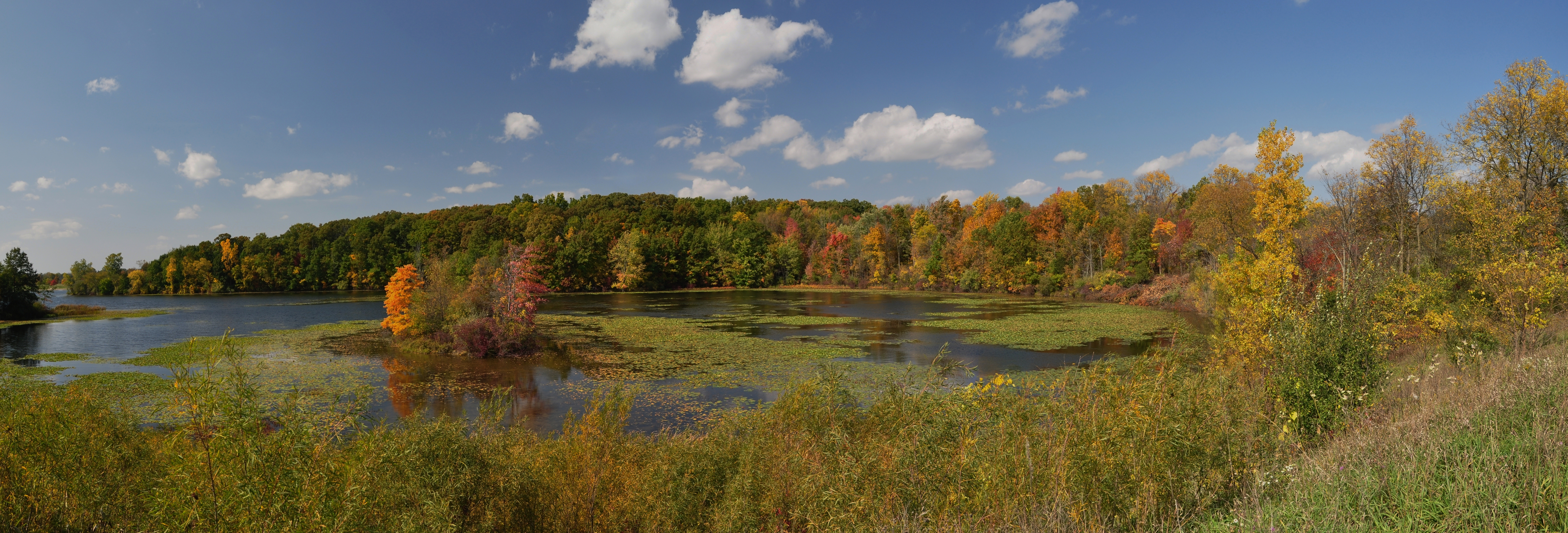
- Seven Lakes State Park, October 2012

- Location within Michigan Location within the United States
- Location: Oakland County, Michigan, United States
- Nearest city: Holly, Michigan
- Coordinates: 42°48′45″N 83°39′50″W
- Area: 1,434 acres (580 ha)
- Elevation: 951 feet (290 m)
- Established: 1971
- Administrator: Michigan Department of Natural Resources
- Designation: Michigan state park
- Website: Official website

Seven Lakes State Park is a public recreation area covering 1,434 acres (580 ha) one mile northwest of Holly in Holly Township, Oakland County, Michigan. The state park's 230 acres (93 ha) of water are found in six named lakes that include 170-acre Big Seven Lake, Little Seven Lake, and 44-acre Dickinson Lake.

== History ==
The park's roots lie in a failed development scheme. In 1967, private interests built a dam on Swartz Creek in the Flint River watershed to create one large lake, Decoup Lake, from seven small lakes. When the developers gave up their efforts, the state purchased the site in 1969, naming it Seven Lakes State Park and its largest body of water Big Seven Lake. The park opened in 1977; a campground on Sand Lake was opened in 1992.

== Activities and amenities ==
Big Seven Lake offers fishing for largemouth and smallmouth bass, northern pike, walleye, yellow perch, black crappie, and channel catfish. Recreational facilities in the park include campsites, swimming beaches, picnic areas, boat launches, trails for hiking and mountain biking, and hunting areas.
