= Coldwater Lake State Park =

Park in Michigan, US

- Location within Michigan Location within the United States
- Interactive map of Coldwater Lake State Park
- Location: Kinderhook Township, Branch County, Michigan, United States
- Nearest city: Coldwater, Michigan
- Coordinates: 41°48′05″N 84°58′20″W
- Area: 400 acres (160 ha)
- Elevation: 981 feet (299 m)
- Established: 1987
- Administrator: Michigan Department of Natural Resources
- Designation: Michigan State Park
- Website: Official website

Coldwater Lake State Park is an undeveloped public recreation area occupying 400 acres (160 ha) on the south shore of Coldwater Lake, ten miles (16 km) south of the city of Coldwater in Branch County, Michigan. Money from the Natural Resources Trust Funds was used to create the state park in 1988. Two small, unpaved parking areas offer walk-in access for hunters and fishermen. A general management plan for the park was adopted by the Michigan State Parks Advisory Committee in 2015.
