= Maybury State Park =

Park in Michigan, USA

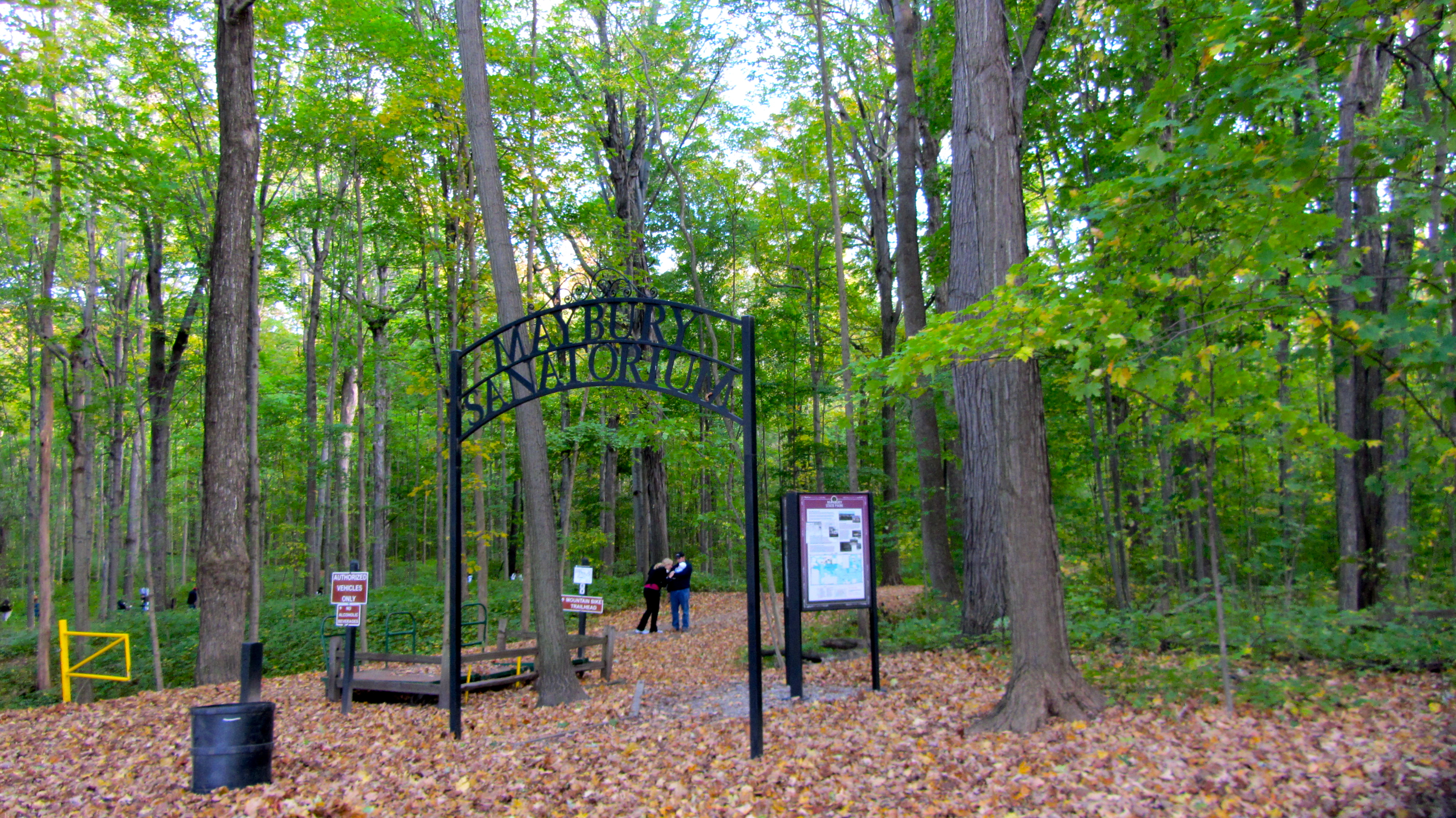

- Location within Michigan Location within the United States
- Location: Wayne County, Michigan, United States
- Nearest city: Northville, Michigan
- Coordinates: 42°25′46″N 83°31′58″W
- Area: 944 acres (382 ha)
- Elevation: 955 feet (291 m)
- Established: 1971
- Administrator: Michigan Department of Natural Resources
- Designation: Michigan state park
- Website: Official website

Maybury State Park is a public recreation area in Northville Township, Wayne County, Michigan composed of 944 acres (382 ha) of gently rolling terrain, open meadow, and mature forest. The park gives people in the nearby metropolitan area an opportunity to get involved in outdoor recreation activities in a state park setting. Lying adjacent to the park, Maybury Farm is operated as a separate facility by the Northville Community Foundation.

== History ==
Before Maybury began operating as a state park, its woods and farm fields were the site of a tuberculosis sanatorium, named for the Detroit-area real estate investor William H. Maybury who had spearheaded its development. At its height, the campus had over 40 buildings, including infirmaries, residences, children's playgrounds, and a school. The facility was developed in response to rising rates of tuberculosis in the city of Detroit during the early 20th century, in the hopes of relieving Detroit's strained tuberculosis wards. Situated in the northwest corner of Wayne County, Maybury's location was thought suitably remote to allow abundant fresh air and quiet for patient recovery while also quarantining patients away from greater Detroit. Advancements in medicine resulted in significant drops in tuberculosis rates mid-century, leading to the facility's eventual closure in 1969. Most of the buildings were demolished before the land became Wayne County's first state park in 1975. Many of Maybury's paved walking trails are on former trails and roadways, although just three stone and brick doctors' residences remain today.

Park headquarters operated out of a similar brick building along Beck Road. In 2020, a modern facility was constructed near the main entrance off Eight Mile Road. Park officials attempted to secure a tenant or a buyer for the former headquarters building but were unable to do so. As a result, it was deemed surplus and slated for demolition. Northville Township Fire Department was invited to use the facility and a former maintenance garage for training, which took place on April 13, 2023, after which demolition work was completed.

In 2003 the DNR asked the Northville Community Foundation to take over the operations of the Maybury Farm, which had been closed in 2002. An agreement was reached and the farm reopened in September 2005. In February 2003, a fire destroyed the main barns, some of the farm's equipment and killed many of the farm's animals. A public fundraising campaign led to the rebuilding of the farm including moving 125-year-old barns from a nearby town.

== Activities and amenities ==
The state park offers pond fishing, picnicking, playgrounds, stables, and many miles of trails for hiking, biking, cross-country skiing, and equestrian use. Maybury Farm provides educational programming, sheep shearing, hay rides, corn maze, and other public farming demonstrations.
