= Iyopawa Island =

Island in Michigan

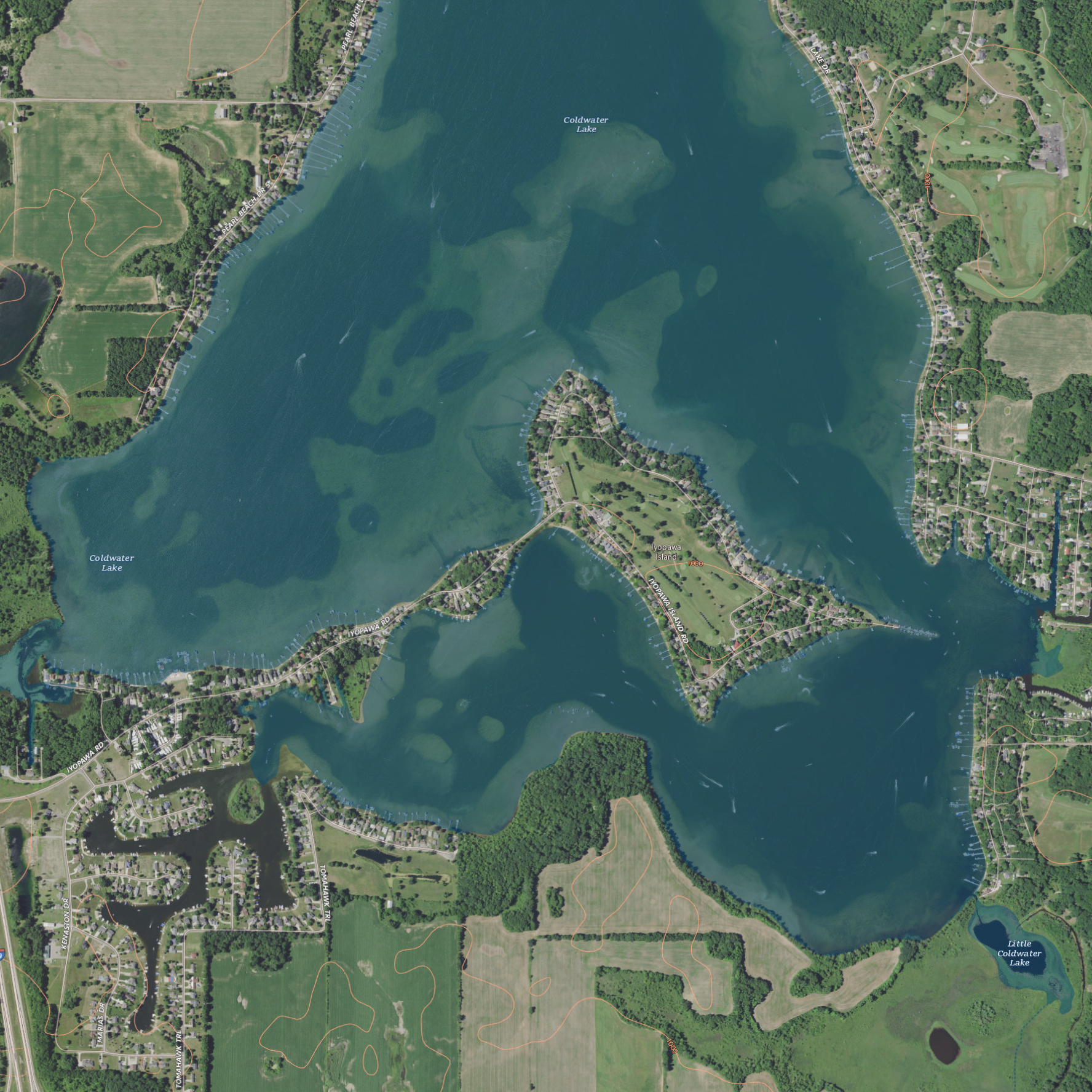
- USGS aerial imagery of Iyopawa Island

- Location within Michigan Location within the United States

Geography
- Location: Michigan
- Coordinates: 41°48′49″N 84°58′24″W
- Area: 129 acres (52 ha)
- Highest elevation: 1,001 ft (305.1 m)

Administration
- United States
- State: Michigan
- County: Branch

Iyopawa Island is an island in Coldwater Lake in Michigan, United States. It is the only island in Branch County. Its coordinates are 41°48′49″N 84°58′24″W, and the United States Geological Survey gave its elevation as 1,001 ft (305 m) in 1980. It is connected to the mainland by a land bridge, and accessible via Iyopawa Road (off Old 27). The island contains a nine-hole golf course, surrounded by homes and cottages.

== History ==
Iyopawa Island was "famous in Indian lore as the battleground of the Pottawatomies". Later, fruit was farmed on the island. By the 1920s, it was owned by Daniel W. Weage, who used it to grow peonies. His "mammoth" farm was one of the largest in the United States; it attracted "thousands of persons from all parts of the country", and was frequently visited by garden clubs from Michigan. It was connected to the mainland by a land bridge constructed in 1929, by which point a 9-hole golf course was already in operation on the island. By 1940, the Battle Creek Enquirer mentioned that it had as many as 50 summer residents.

In 1949, the golf course was purchased by Barbara H. Stukey and her husband, who sold it to an Indiana real estate company in 1966. The course was later operated by Annabelle Davis. In 1987, it was purchased by Mark E. Taylor, who sold it in 1995 to the Iyopawa Island Preservation Association, at which point Dana Tribble and his family began to lease the land. While conditions on the course degraded over the period of Taylor's ownership, the Tribbles' ownership increased its popularity greatly, and by 1996 it was described as having "some of the nicest greens in the area". In 2002, the Battle Creek Enquirer wrongly claimed that the golf course was opened "around 1950".

The golf course has nine holes, three sand traps, and has been described as "fairly flat, open and short" in 1996. Despite being on an island, the course has no water hazards. The course has three sets of tees.
