= Bewabic State Park =

Park in Michigan, USA

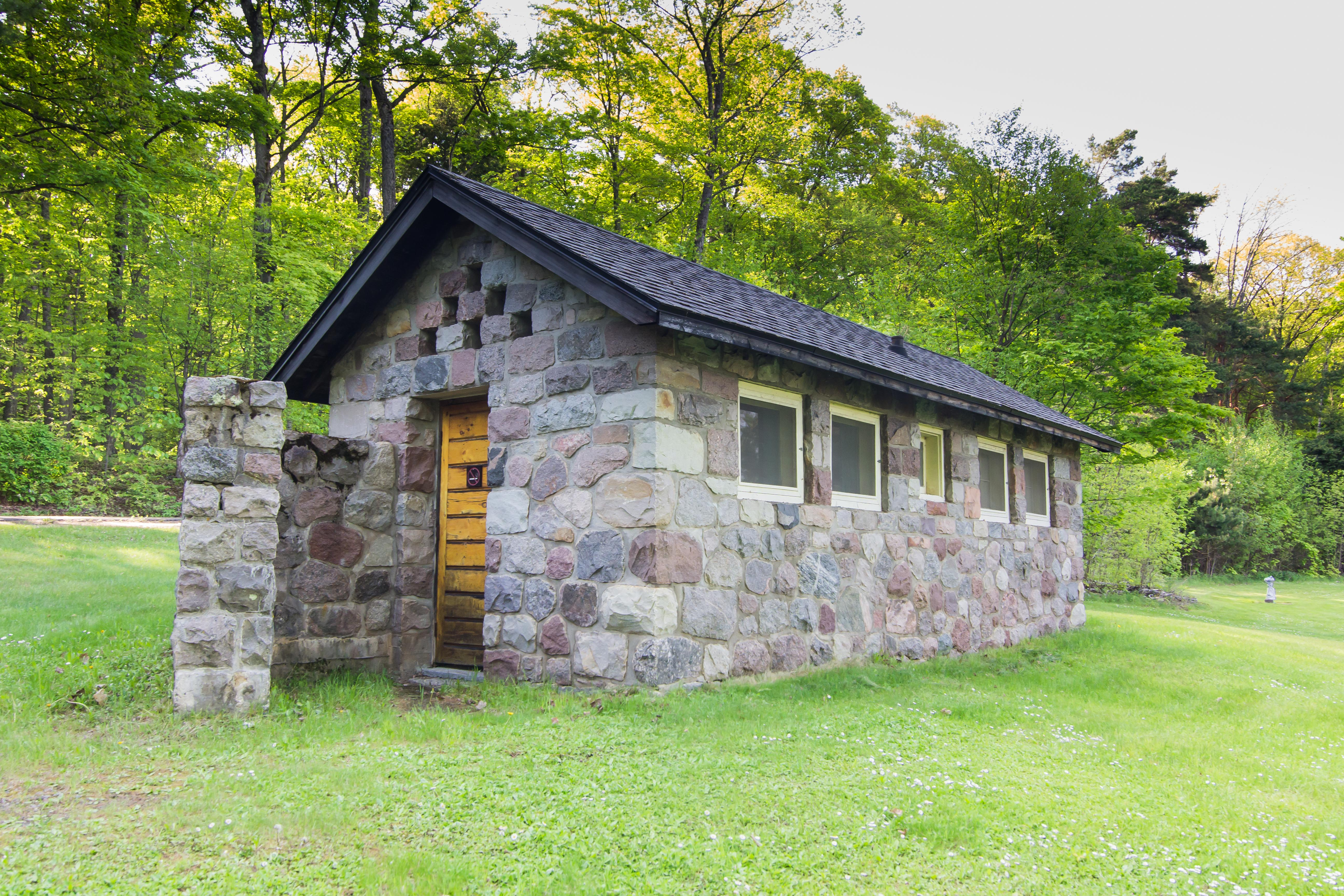
- Oldest building in the park

- Location within Michigan Location within the United States
- Location: Crystal Falls Township, Iron County, Michigan, United States
- Nearest city: Crystal Falls, Michigan
- Coordinates: 46°05′33″N 88°25′38″W
- Area: 315 acres (127 ha)
- Elevation: 1,365 feet (416 m)
- Established: 1923 (state park 1966)
- Administrator: Michigan Department of Natural Resources
- Designation: Michigan state park
- Website: Official website
- Bewabic Park
- U.S. National Register of Historic Places
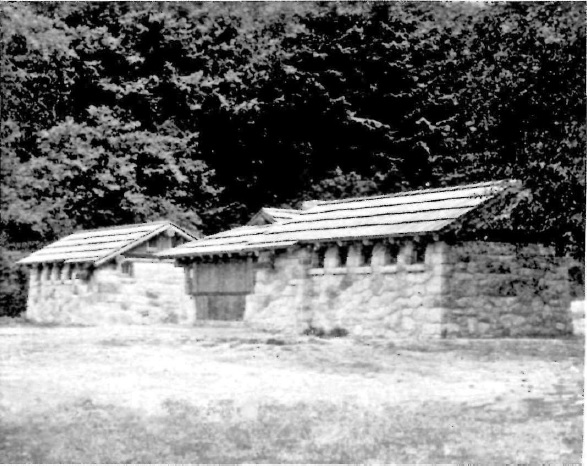
- Bewabic bathhouse, c. 1938
- Built: 1923, 1935
- Built by: Civilian Conservation Corps
- Architect: Abraham Anderson, Glenn Case Gregg
- NRHP reference No.: 16000179
- Added to NRHP: April 19, 2016

Bewabic State Park is a public recreation area covering 315 acres (127 ha) on the shore of Fortune Lake (First Lake), four miles (6.4 km) west of Crystal Falls in Iron County, Michigan. The state park's rich Civilian Conservation Corps history is evidenced by the CCC structures still in use. The park was listed on the National Register of Historic Places for its CCC-related architecture in 2016.

== History ==
Herbert F. Larson was appointed as engineer-manager of the Iron County Road Commission in 1917. Taking advantage of a 1913 Michigan law, Larson purchased for the county individual tracts of land as well as wide rights of way along what is now US-2, to be set aside as parks for public use. He particularly looked for and obtained some of the last stands of virgin timber in the county. Larson is credited, in 1919, with the establishment of the first roadside park in America on Stager Lake along US 2. The success of the Stager Lake park led Larson to purchase land for other parks, including the area that is now Bewabic State Park.

Bewabic Park was created in 1923, when Larson purchased a 120-acre farmstead on Fortune Lake containing a stand of virgin timber. Larson turned the farmhouse into a caretaker's residence, and installed a bathing beach, picnic area parking lot, and campground. Improvements at the park were minimal until 1933, when workers from the Civil Works Administration (CWA) were assigned to the park.

One hundred and seventy CWA workers were assigned to Bewabic Park in 1933. They constructed a footbridge and trail to access an island in Fortune Lake, built a bandstand and tennis courts, added stoves and tables to the picnic area, and built a large wooden picnic shelter known as "The Wigwam." After its halt, the CWA program was replaced by the Civilian Conservation Corps (CCC). In 1935, one hundred and eight CCC workers began work in Bewabic Park, and continued until 1937.

The CCC workers implemented an extensive plan for Bewabic Park, which included constructing buildings designed by local architect Abraham Anderson and implementing landscaping designed by Glenn Case Gregg of Michigan State College. The workers moved the farmhouse, tore down the associated barns, and expanded the picnic area. They built a log bathhouse that included dressing rooms and store rooms for canoes, a stone restroom, and stone drinking fountains. They also constructed more benches and tables, installed a playground and footpaths, and expanded the camping area.

In 1966, Bewabic Park was purchased by the state of Michigan as part of an acquisition program to substantially expand the state park system. The next year the state purchased 40 adjoining acres to create the present park. In 1971, the bathhouse was remodeled, and in 1975 the campground was substantially increased in size. However, the park still contains significant examples of the rustic park architecture originally built by the CWA and the CCC.

== Description and CCC structures ==
Bewawbic Park covers 315-acre (1.27 km^{2}) on the bank of Fortune Lake and the south side of US 2. A cut fieldstone wall, constructed by the CCC in 1936, lines US 2. The park contains several day-use areas, including an island within Fortune Lake, and three campground loops.

=== Northeast Day-Use Area ===
The northeast day-use area is centered around the Fortune Lake beach. A log bathhouse constructed by the CCC in 1937 sits at the top of the hill above the lake. A log picnic shelter built in 1974 is located a little lower down the hill. In between the bathhouse and picnic shelter is a semicircle of mature maple trees, within which are a stone stove and picnic table.

The 1937 log bathhouse is a significant feature of the park. It was designed by Abraham Anderson of Ironwood, Michigan. The bathhouse is constructed from horizontally placed logs stained dark brown atop a three-foot-tall fieldstone foundation, with a low pitched, side-gable roof of wood shingles. The building consists of a central body with two wings. The entrance is through a central door, protected by a shed roof overhang. The wings have entry doors in the gable ends, and windows flanked by wooden shutters on the side. These wings were originally built as dressing rooms and canoe storage, then were converted in 1970 to restrooms.

=== Island ===
A foot trail from the beach runs along the lake to access an island. Originally a peninsula, the island was created in 1933 by CWA workers who dug a canal to separate it from the main shore. A short wood plank footbridge crosses the canal, and a trail continues in a loop around one end of the island. Three CCC-built fireplaces are located on the island, two smaller ones and one relatively large. The two small fireplaces are about knee-high and made of stone. The large fireplace is made of randomly coursed, rough cut fieldstone with raised mortar joints.

=== Southwest Day-Use Area ===
The southwestern day-use area, separated from the beach by a band of trees, accommodates multiple activities, and contains a stone restroom building and a stove/fireplace. It also contains 1934 CWA-built tennis courts and a small playground. A natural hollow once contained the 1934 band shelter built by the CWA. While the band shelter no longer exists, the area is still used as an amphitheater.

The restroom was designed by Abraham Anderson in 1936. It is a side-gable stone building with a roof of wood shake shingles. The stone construction consists of random course fieldstone at the base, blending into a regular course of square-cut stones just under the roof line. The gable ends of the building have small pyramids of ventilation openings, created by eliminating every other stone in the course. Below are entry doors, which are screened from view by a six-foot, L-shaped stone wall protruding from the building. A small window is located in the center of the building, and is flanked on each side by two 12-light windows.

=== Campgrounds ===
There are three campground loops designated A, B, and C that contain 28, 48, and 55 campsites respectively. Loop A was built by the CCC in 1936, and has campsites on the outer perimeter of the loop with a grassy communal area in the center. Sites are separated by thick vegetation. Loops B and C were built in the 1970s with campsites located on both sides of the loop roads and no vegetation.

== Activities and amenities ==
The park offers tennis courts, swimming, fishing, hiking, picnicking facilities, boat launch, playgrounds, cross-country skiing, and metal detecting.

== Images ==
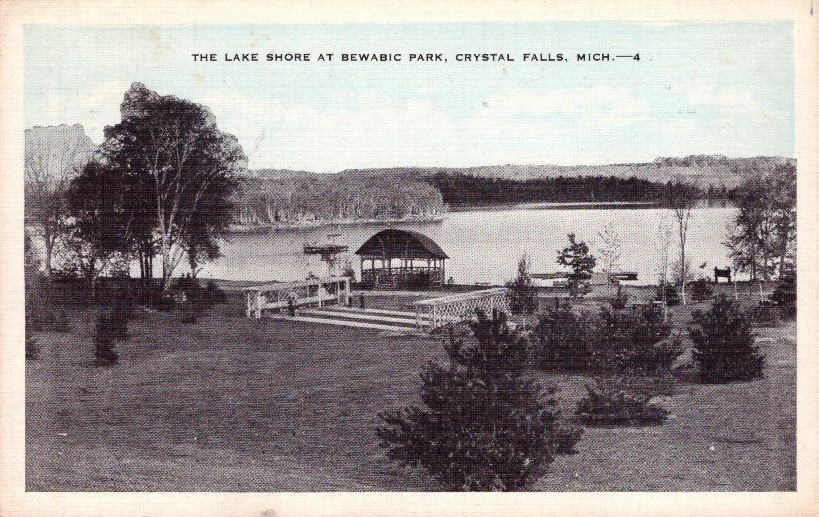
Fortune Lake shore, c. 1940

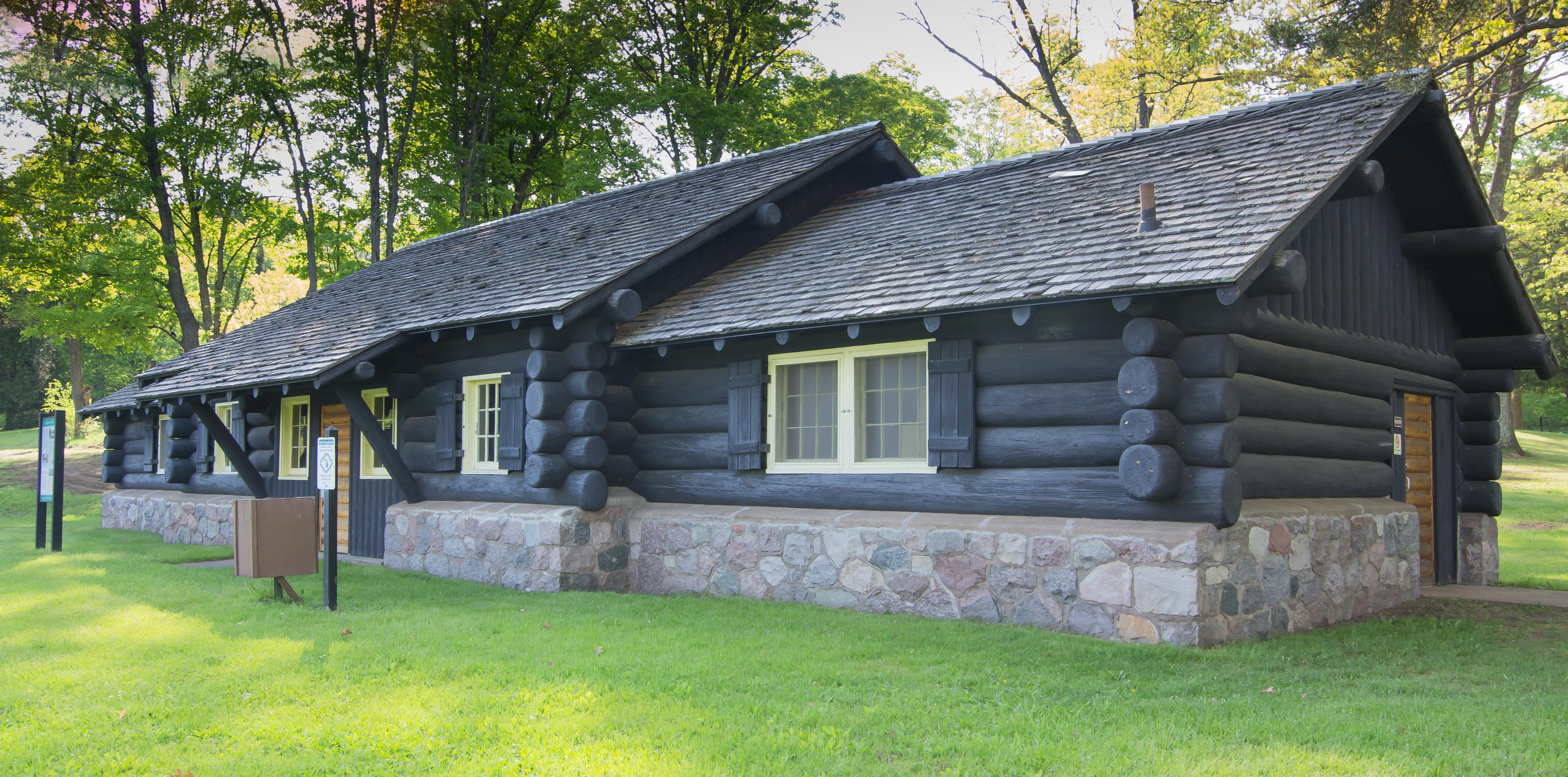
Log Building

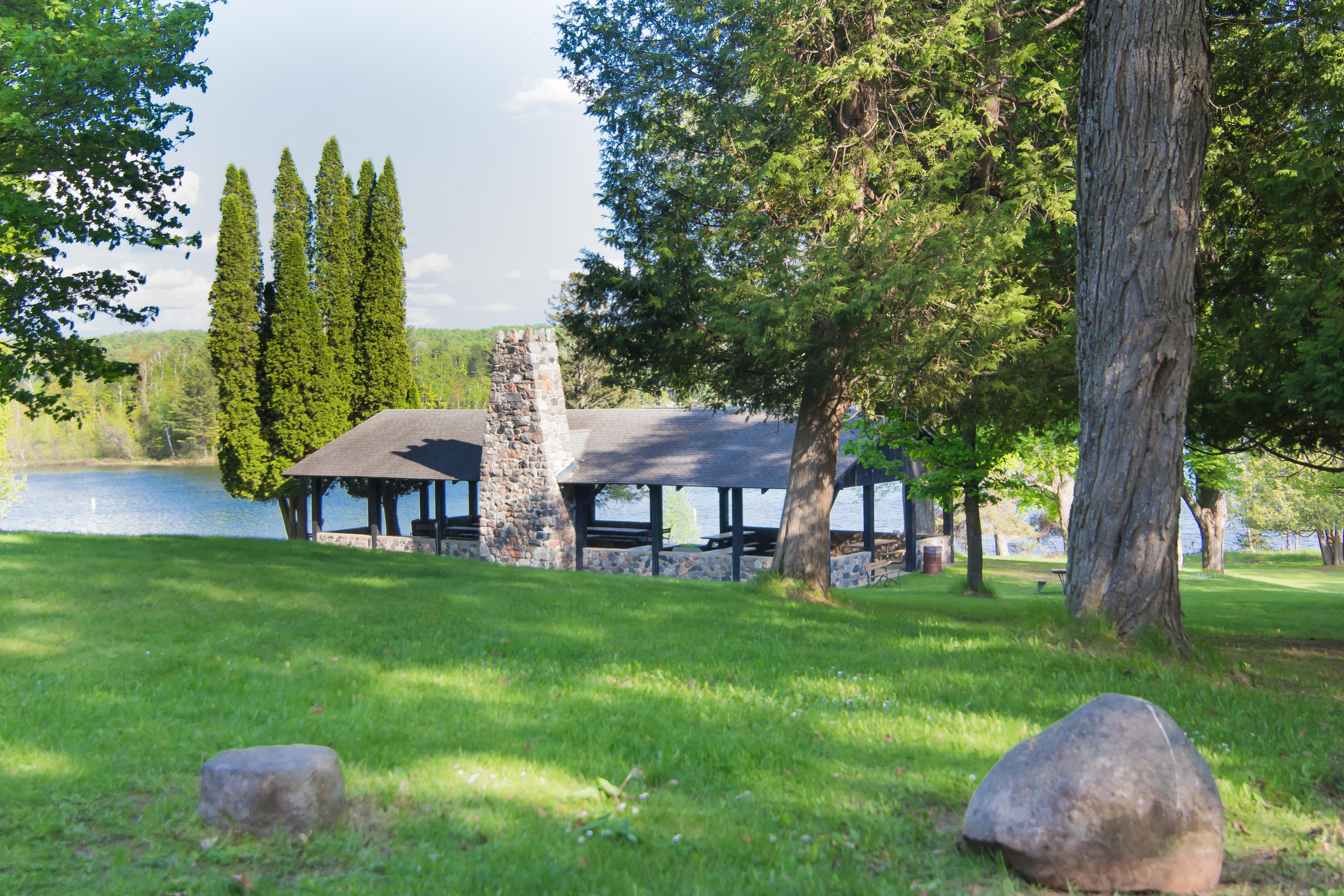
Open Picnic Shelter

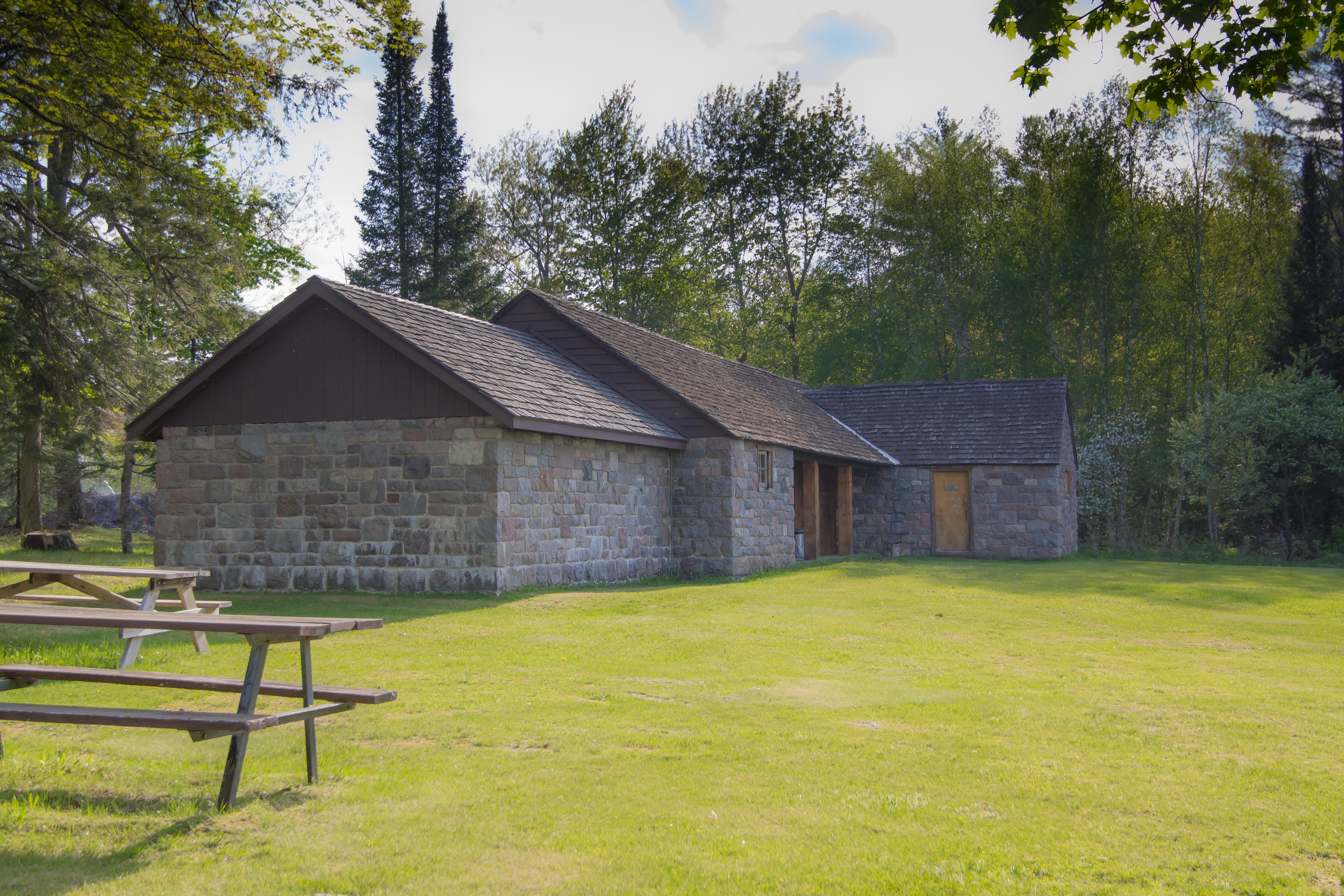
Shelter and Picnic Area
