= Interlochen State Park =

Park in Michigan, USA

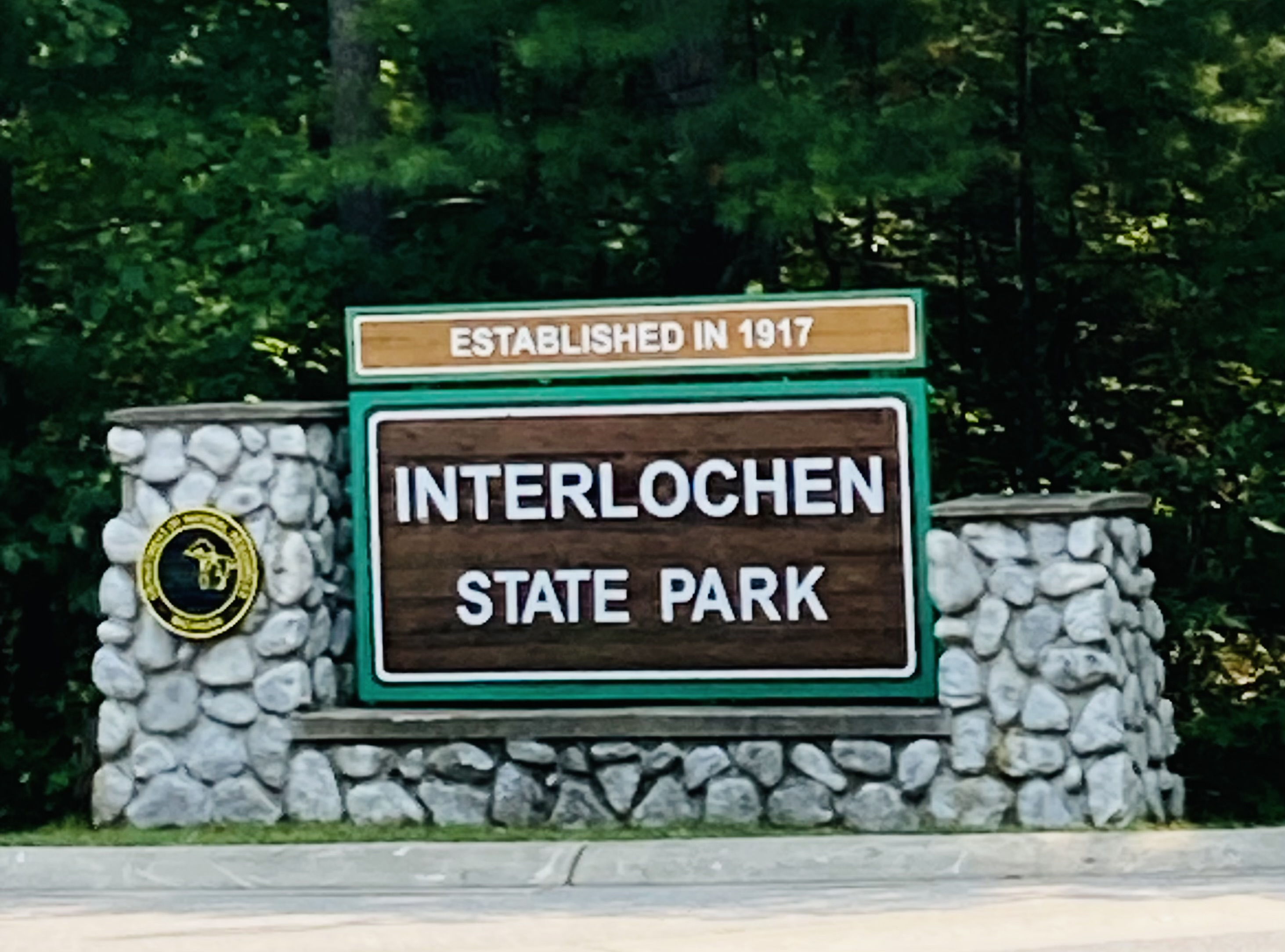
- entrance signage

- Location within Michigan Location within the United States
- Location: Green Lake Township, Grand Traverse County, Michigan, United States
- Nearest city: Traverse City, Michigan
- Coordinates: 44°37′40″N 85°45′46″W
- Area: 187 acres (76 ha)
- Elevation: 837 feet (255 m)
- Established: 1919 (purchased in 1917)
- Administrator: Michigan Department of Natural Resources
- Designation: Michigan state park
- Website: Official website

Interlochen State Park is a public recreation area covering 187 acres (76 ha) on the isthmus between Green Lake and Duck Lake in Grand Traverse County, Michigan. The park offers swimming, year-round fishing, picnicking, camping, and boat launches.

The site features a park store, known as "The Lodge" and the Explorer Guide series that offers recreational activities. Rustic cabins are also available to rent along with traditional camp sites.

== History ==
Interlochen State Park, originally called Pine Park, was established in 1917 when the Michigan Legislature paid $60,000 for the land, making it the State of Michigan's first officially recognized state park. It was created to preserve for future generations the virgin pine stand (Pinus strobus). It is one of the few easily reached places in Michigan where old-growth (pre-European settlement) red pine can be found. (Note: Hartwick Pines State Park preserves the other stand of virgin eastern white pine in Michigan's Lower Peninsula.)

In 1928, the National Music Camp, Interlochen Center for the Arts was established on the property adjoining the northern boundary of the park.
