= Rockport State Recreation Area =

State park in Michigan, United States

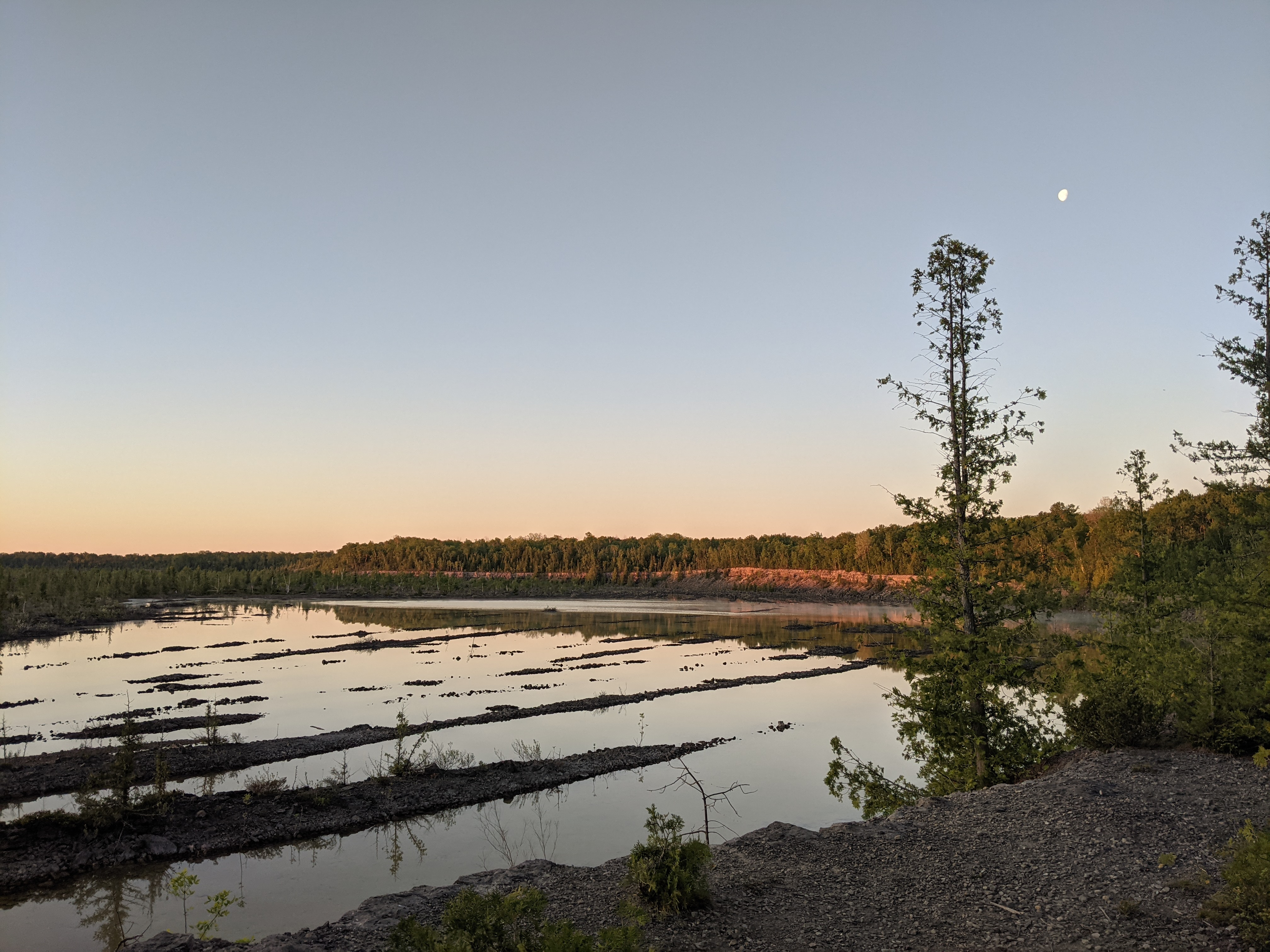
- View of the old quarry

- Location within Michigan Location within the United States
- Location: Alpena, Presque Isle counties, Michigan, USA
- Nearest city: Alpena, Michigan
- Coordinates: 45°11′59″N 83°23′42″W
- Area: 4,237 acres (17.15 km^{2})
- Established: 2012
- Governing body: Michigan Department of Natural Resources
- Website: Official website

Rockport State Recreation Area is a 4,237-acre (17.15 km^{2}) state park located along the shore of Lake Huron in Alpena and Presque Isle counties in the state of Michigan, United States. It is operated by the Michigan Department of Natural Resources and was established in 2012. The park contains limestone formations and an old limestone quarry. There is a deep water boat launch that can accommodate all sizes of watercraft. The park is located along the Lake Huron Flyway. It is used to gauge the health of Lake Huron and its shoreline environment. Several ship wrecks can be found off-shore in the Thunder Bay National Marine Sanctuary, including the Portland and the Portsmouth. The park was previously known as "The Rockport property" and is not far north of Alpena, Michigan.

In Alpena County, about 11 miles south is the Michigan Nature Association's Julius C. and Marie Moran Peter Memorial Nature Sanctuary. The sanctuary encompasses 95 acres and Grass Lake. Dwarf lake iris, bird's-eye primrose and eastern white cedar surround it, and running through it is Hamilton Road, Michigan's first declared "Natural Beauty Road" (1971). Rockport State Recreation Area was designated a Michigan "dark sky preserve" in 2016.

Rockport State Park is Michigan's 100th state park and a dark sky preserve. It contains a 300 acres (120 ha) abandoned limestone quarry, Devonian fossils, sinkholes and a protected deep water harbor. (Note: "... Rockport State Park, Michigan’s 100th State Park and an official Dark Sky Preserve includes a deep-water protected harbor, an old limestone quarry of approximately 300 acres, a unique series of sinkholes, Devonian Period fossils, the Besser Natural Area, and a broad range of land types, vegetative cover, cultural resources, and recreation opportunities) It is a U.S. 23 route heritage site. It is part of the "Alpena Blueway" paddling route.

== See also ==
- Negwegon State Park
- Thompson's Harbor State Park
