= Highland Recreation Area =

Protected area in Oakland County, Michigan, USA

Highland State Recreation Area
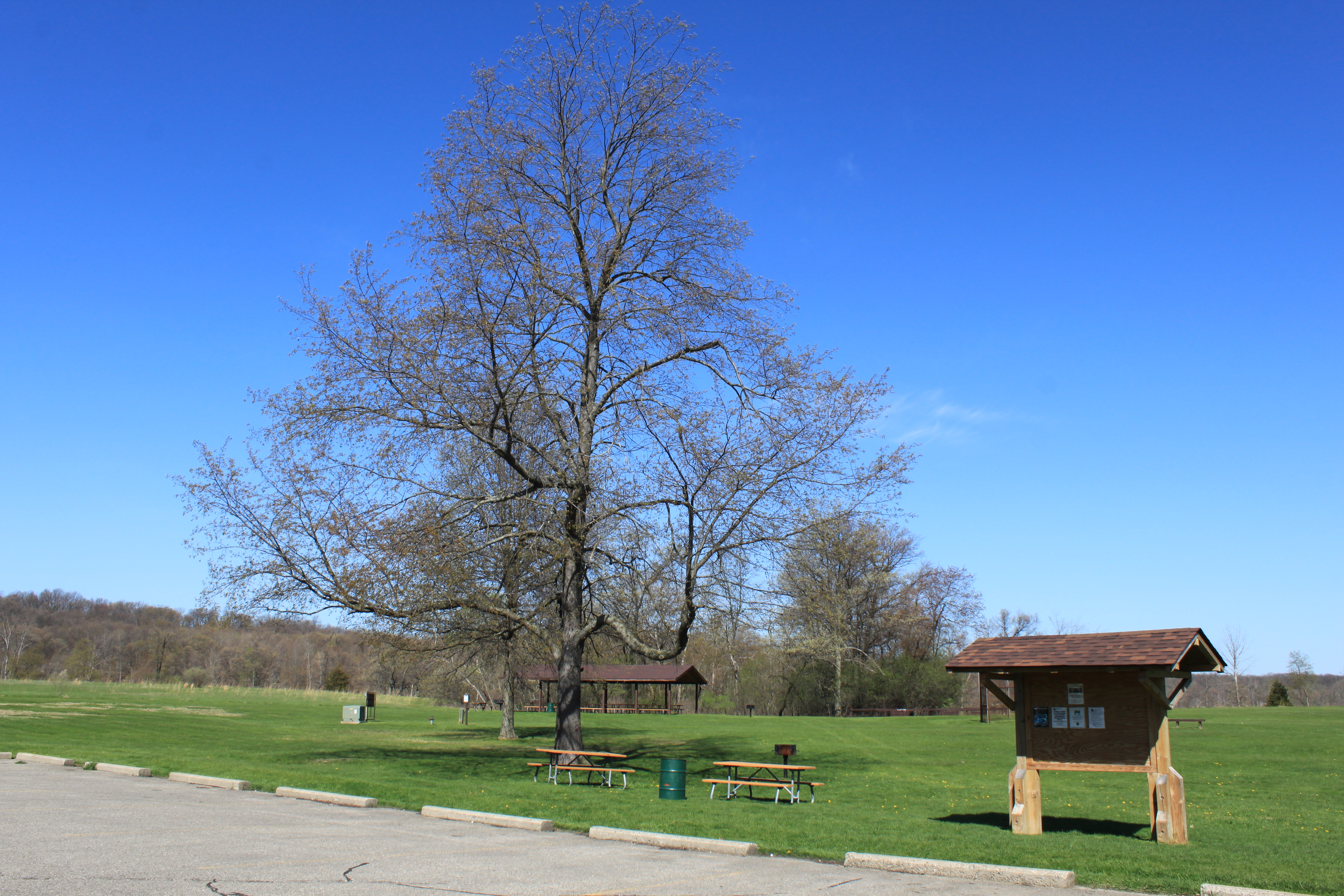
- Goose Meadow Picnic Area

- Location within Michigan Location within the United States
- Location: Highland Township, Oakland County, Michigan, USA
- Nearest city: Milford, Michigan
- Coordinates: 42°38′11″N 83°34′23″W
- Area: 5,900-acre (2,400 ha)
- Governing body: Michigan Department of Natural Resources and Environment
- Website: Official website

Highland State Recreation Area is a 5,900-acre (2,400 ha) state recreation area in the southeast part of the U.S. state of Michigan. It is located in north Oakland County, 14 miles (23 km) west of Pontiac.

Haven Hill Natural Area, within the Highland State Recreation Area, was designated in 1976 as a National Natural Landmark.

== Recreation Area ==
The Michigan Department of Natural Resources (MDNR), which owns and operates Highland, describes the recreation area as a parcel of forest, wetland, and kettle lakes primarily operated for light camping and drive-in/drive-out recreational day use. 45 miles (72 km) of trails in the recreation area are designated for hiking, mountain biking, and equestrian sports.

West of Duck Lake Road in Highland State Recreation Area, a group of small moraines are locally called "mountains"—the highest elevation in the park, Mount Kanzer, is 1,150 feet (350 m) above sea level. The highland for which this recreation area is named is this group of moraines.

== National Natural Landmark ==
South of Highland Road ( M-59) and east of Duck Lake Road lies the 721-acre (292 ha) Haven Hill Natural Area and National Natural Landmark, a component unit of the Highland Recreation Area. MDNR describes Haven Hill as an area that contains "all of southern Michigan's principal forest types within one small area, including swamp forest of tamarack, cedar, beech-maple forest, oak-hickory forest, and mixed hardwood forest. The area has remained largely undisturbed for the past 75 years." Haven Hill was preserved as a natural area first by auto magnate Edsel Ford, whose estate it was, and then by MDNR after Ford's death in 1943.

== Today ==
The Highland State Recreation Area, and the Haven Hill Natural Area embedded within the recreation area, are both located on M-59 directly west of Pontiac, Michigan. The nearest limited-access highway is U.S. Highway 23 at M-59/Highland Road.

== Gallery ==
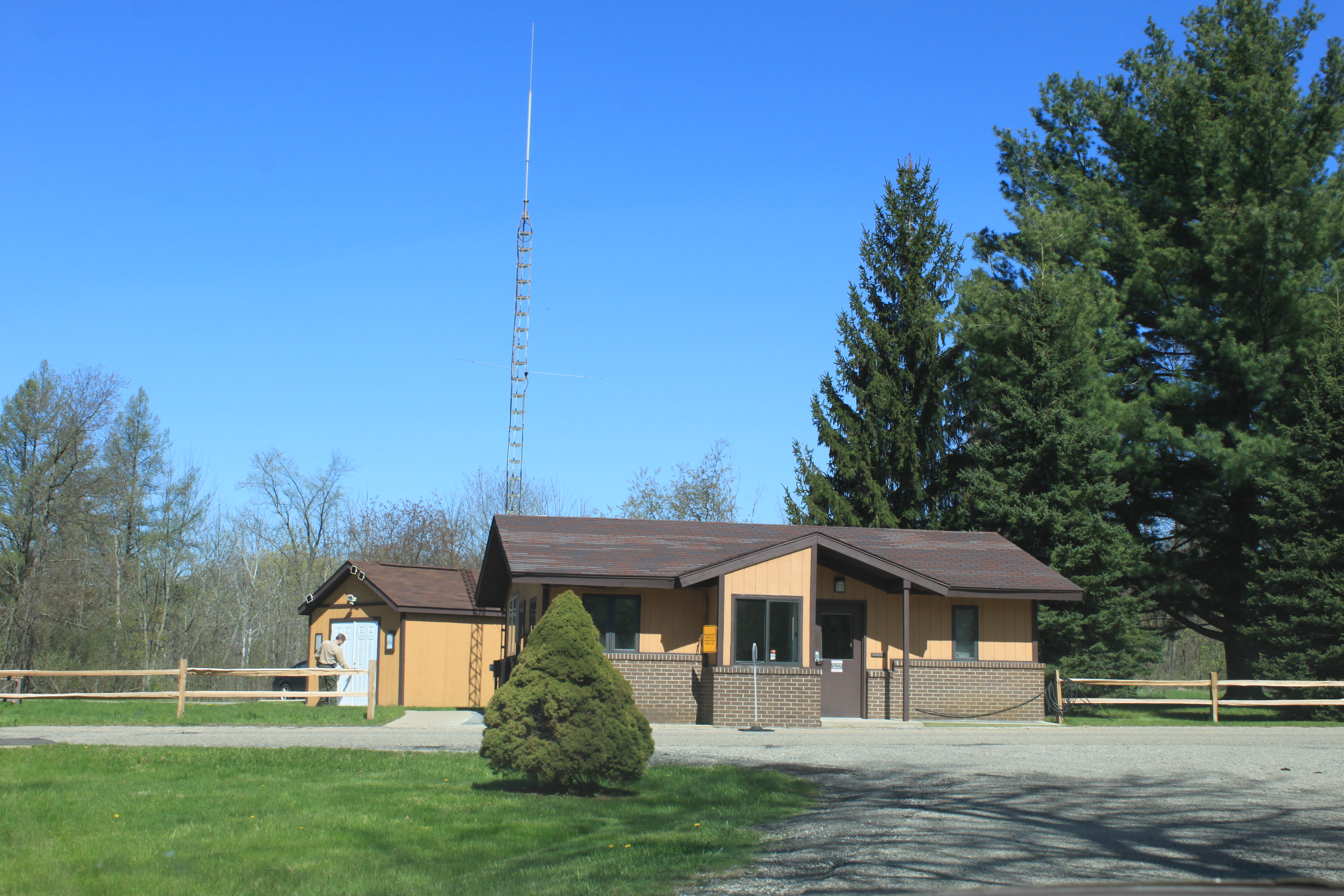
Park office

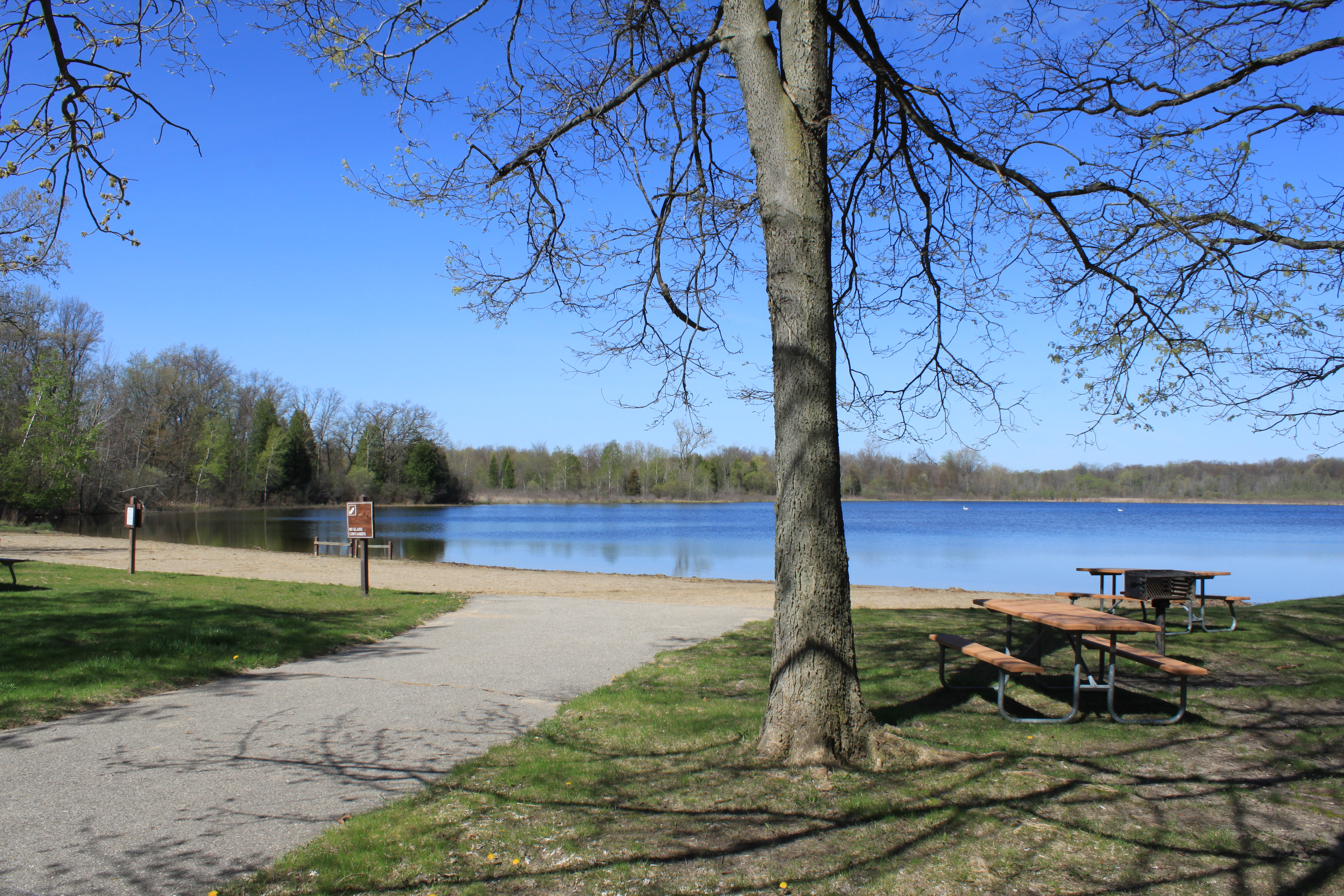
Teeple Lake Beach

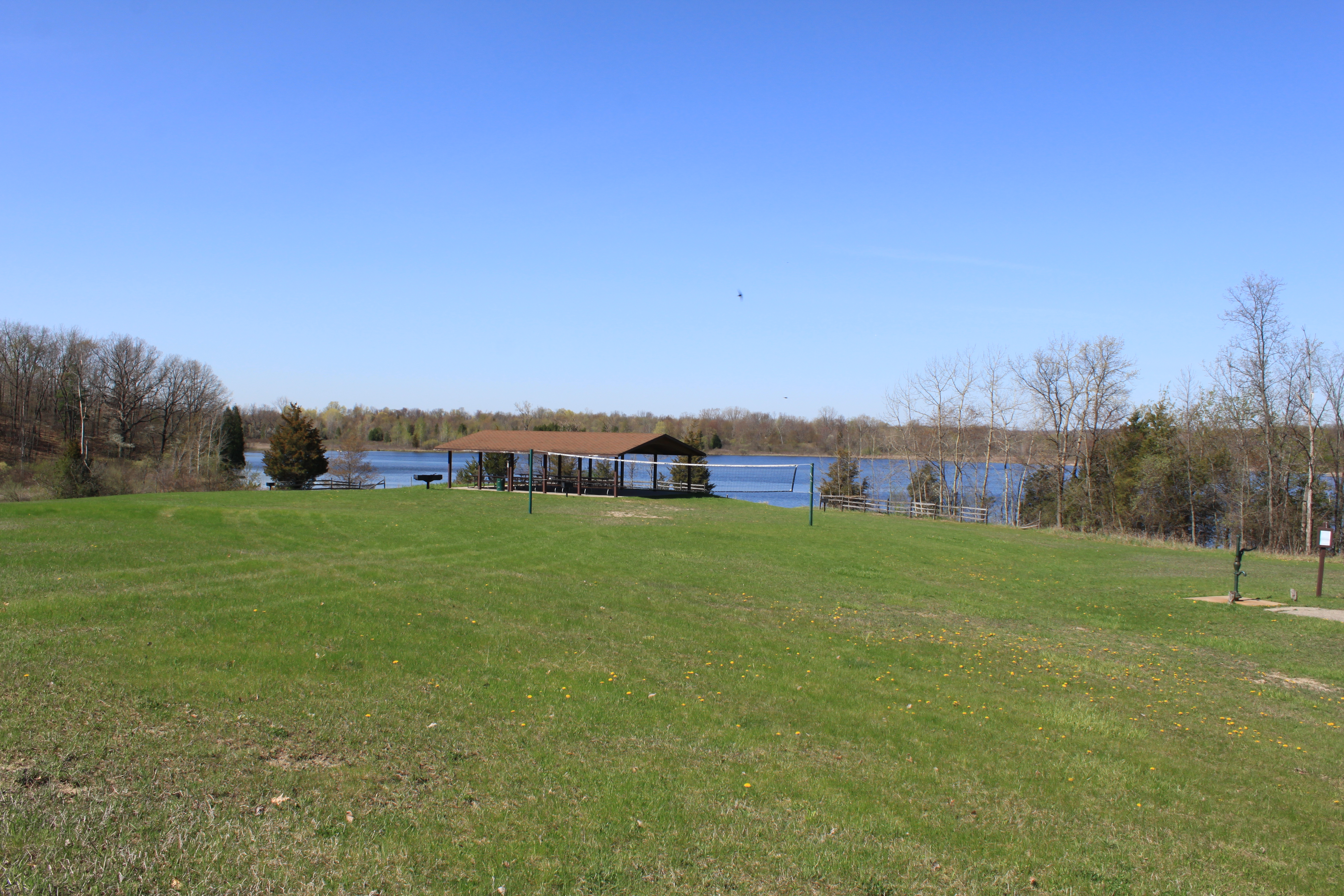
Lakeside Picnic Area
