= Wetzel State Recreation Area =

Recreation area in Michigan, United States

W.C. Wetzel State Recreation Area
- Location within Michigan Location within the United States
- Location: Macomb County, Michigan, USA
- Nearest city: New Haven, Michigan
- Coordinates: 42.735°N 82.84913°W
- Area: 900 acres (364 ha)
- Governing body: Michigan Department of Natural Resources
- Website: Official website

W.C. Wetzel State Recreation Area is an undeveloped 900-acre (360 ha) recreation area, located in Macomb County, Michigan.

== Activities ==
- Cross Country Skiing
- Hiking
- Hunting
- Radio Controlled Flying
- Snowmobiling
