= Thompson's Harbor State Park =

Park in Michigan, USA

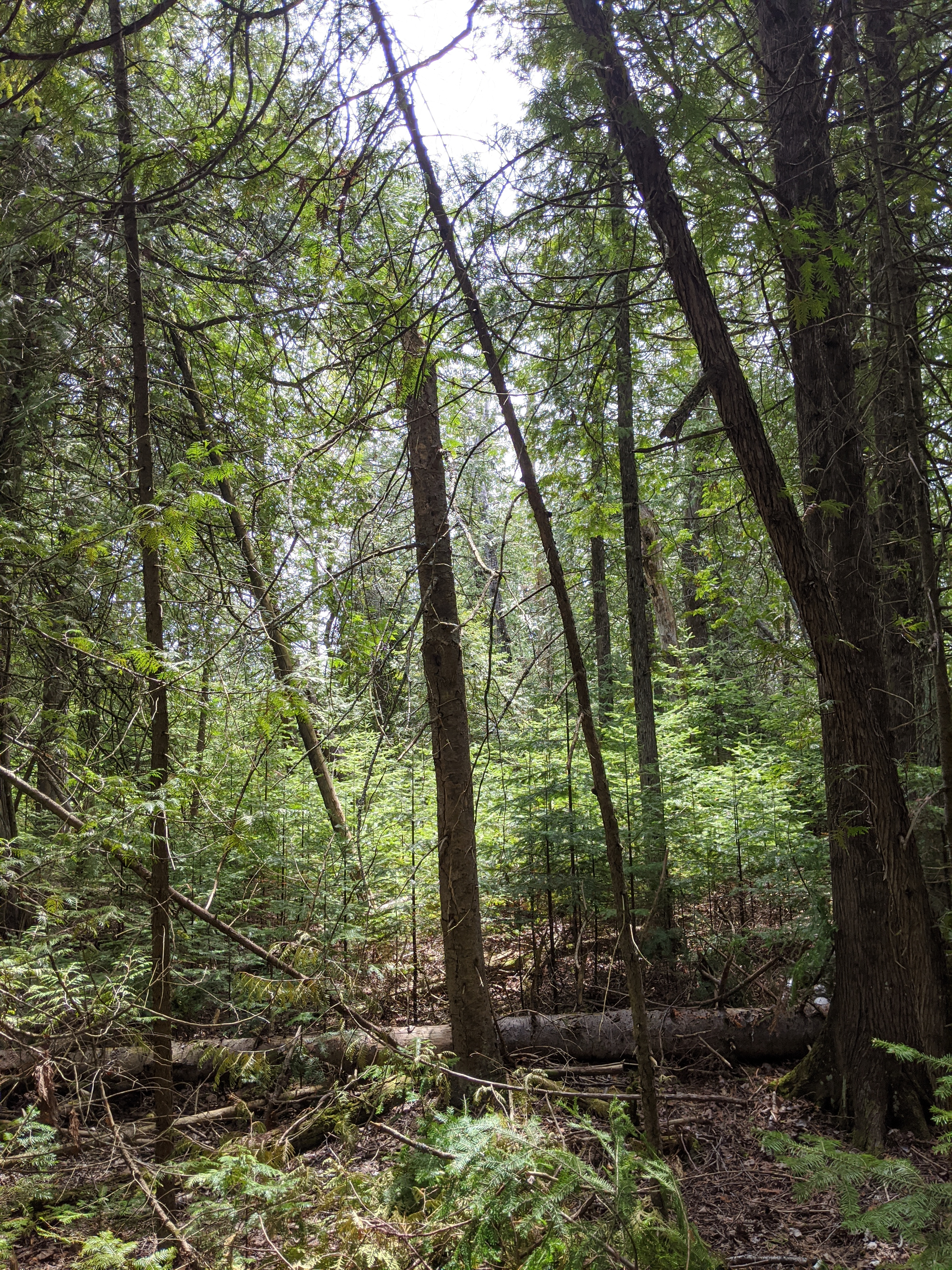

- Location within Michigan Location within the United States
- Location: Krakow Township, Presque Isle County, Michigan, United States
- Nearest city: Rogers City, Michigan
- Coordinates: 45°21′13″N 83°33′40″W
- Area: 5,109 acres (2,068 ha)
- Elevation: 581 feet (177 m)
- Established: 1988
- Administrator: Michigan Department of Natural Resources
- Designation: Michigan state park
- Website: Official website

Thompson's Harbor State Park is a remote and largely undeveloped public recreation area on Lake Huron covering 5,109 acres (2,068 ha) in Presque Isle County, Michigan. The state park's seven point five miles (12.1 km) of pristine shoreline encompass a varying terrain of second growth forest, limestone cobble beaches, and deep sand dunes. The park's flora and fauna include a large population of dwarf lake iris as well as more than one hundred bird species, coyotes, deer, and black bear. The park offers six miles (9.7 km) of trails for hikers and cross-country skiers, rustic cabins, and opportunities for sea kayaking. The park was designated a Michigan "dark sky preserve" in 2016.

== Gallery ==
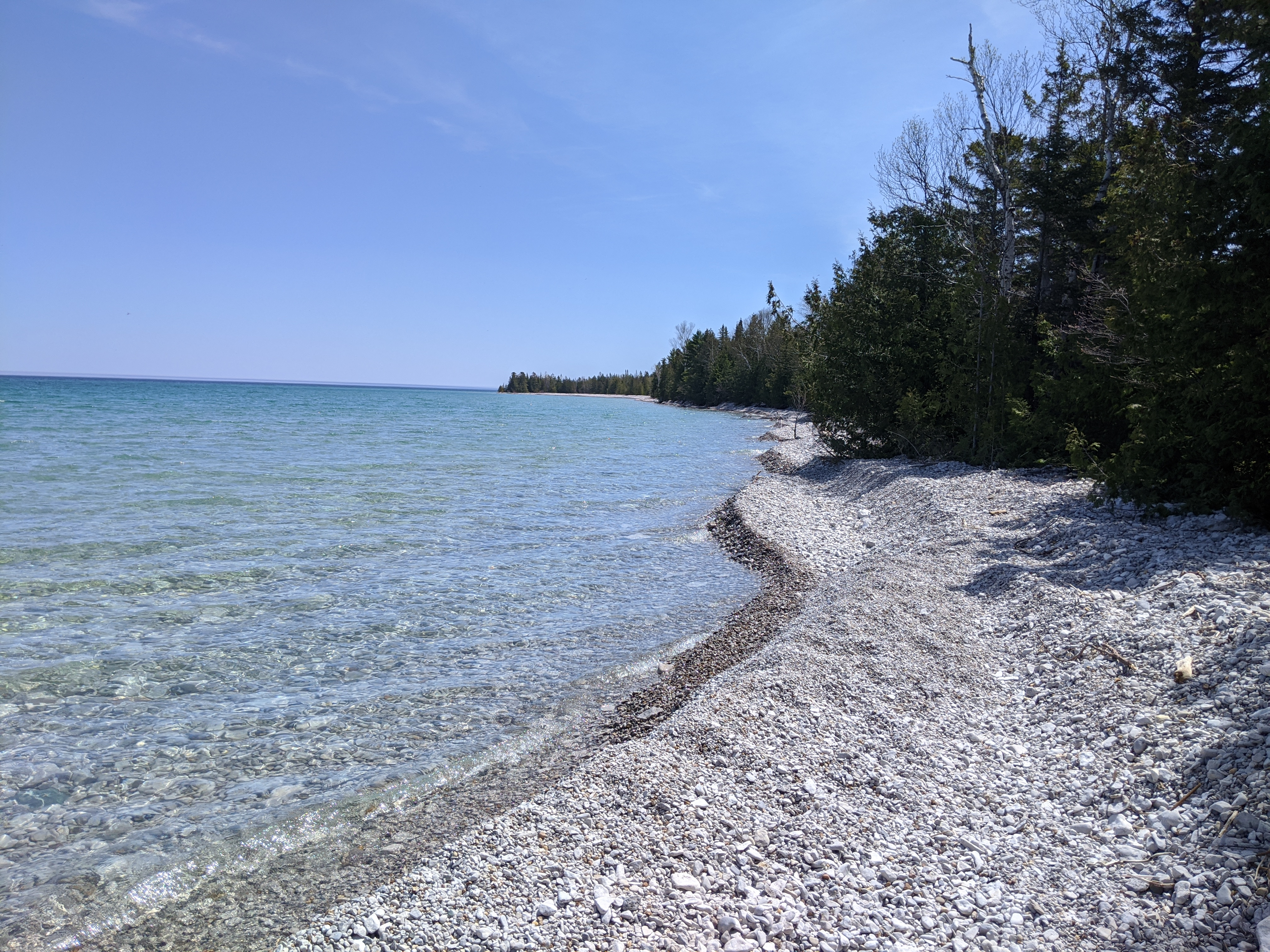
Lake Huron shoreline

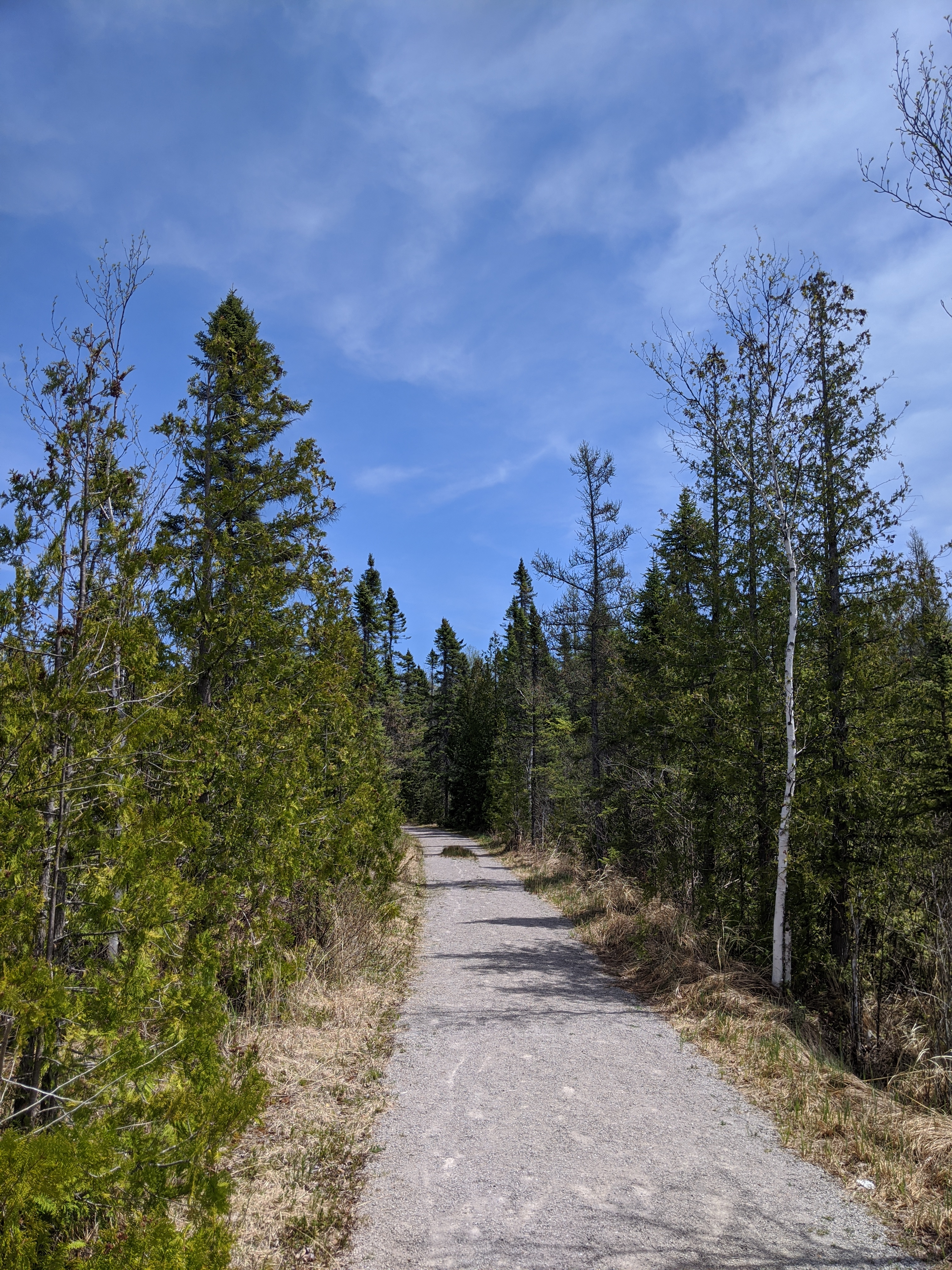
The main walking trail

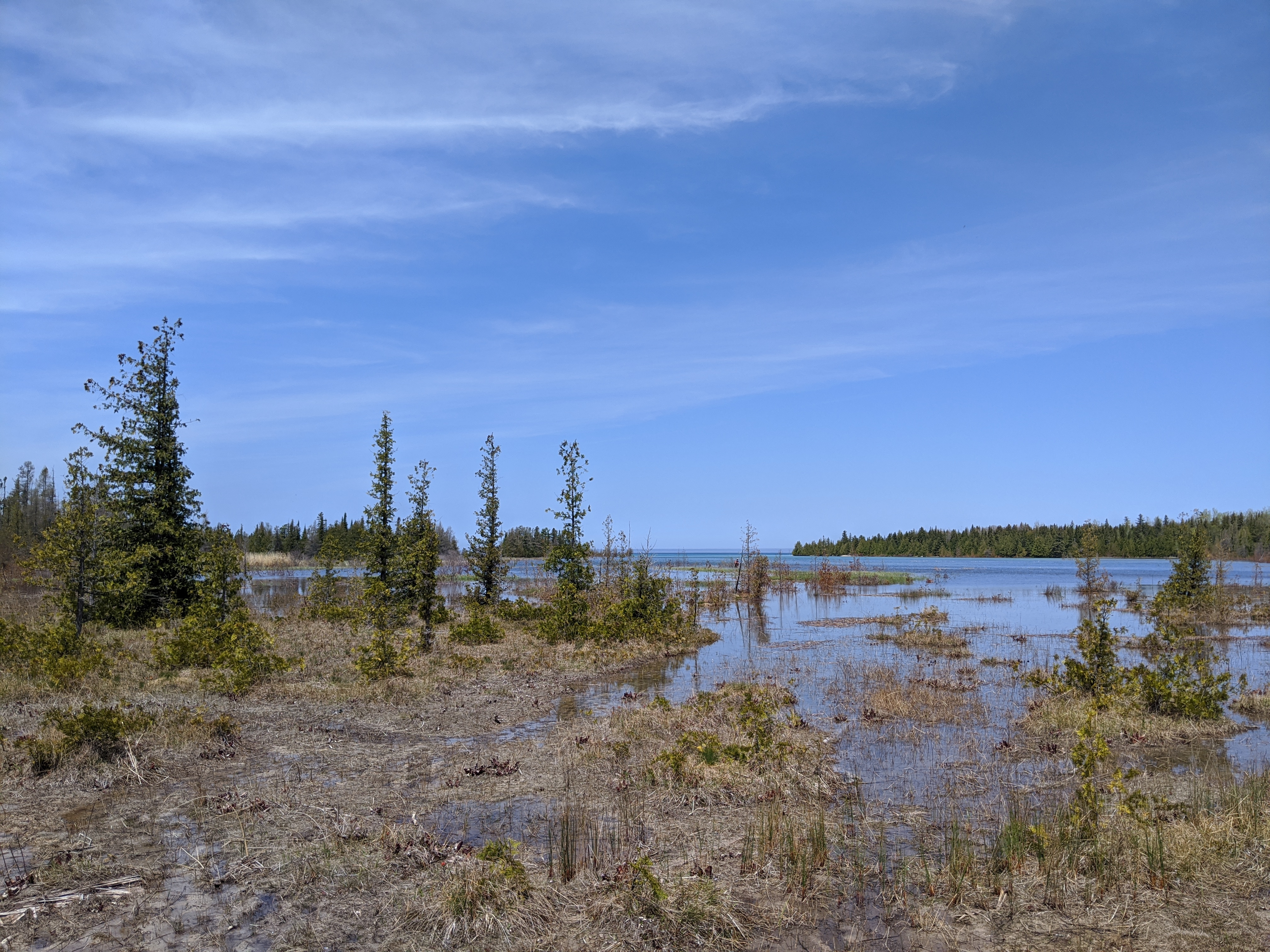
Swampy inlet

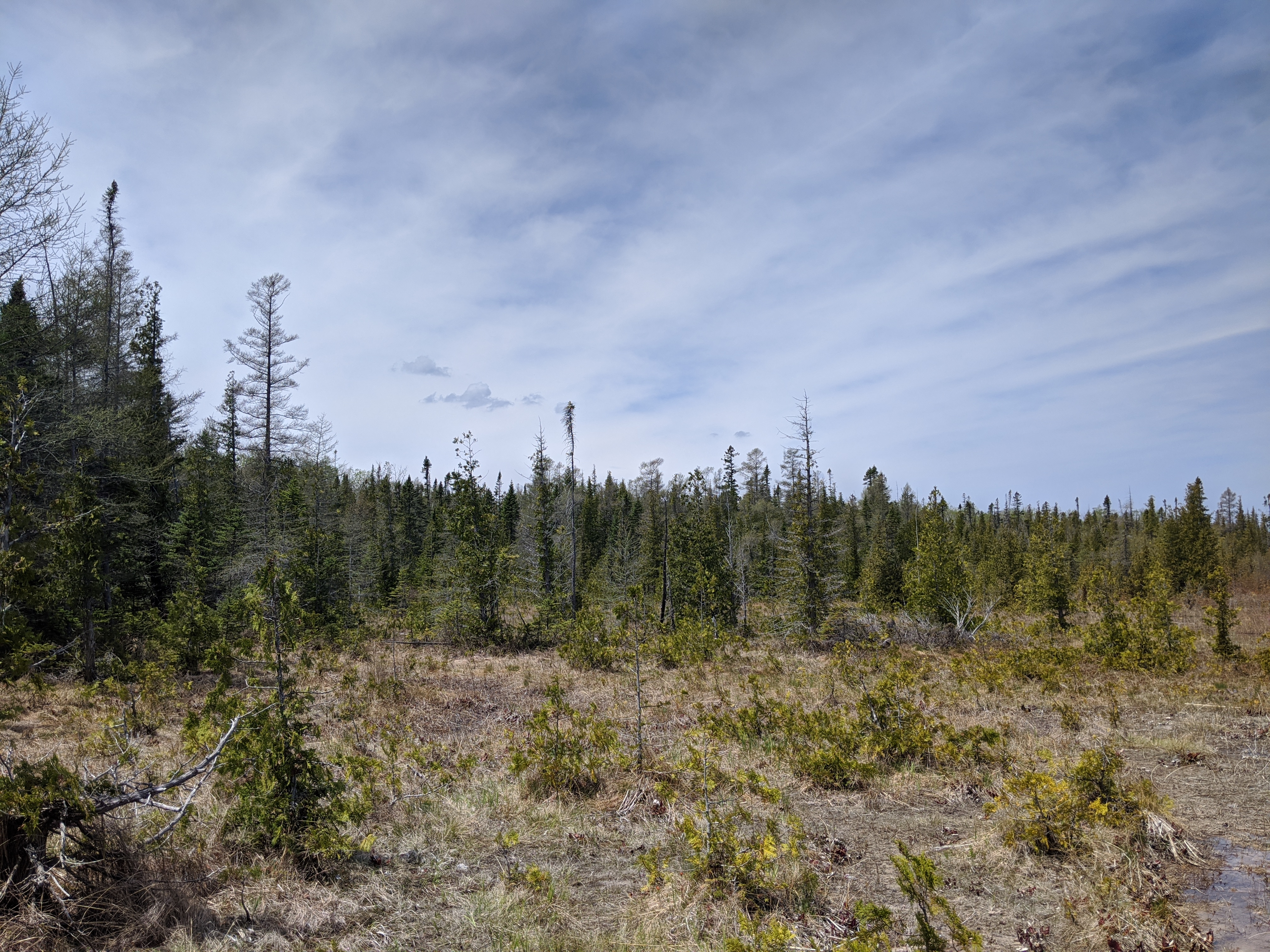
Cedar flat

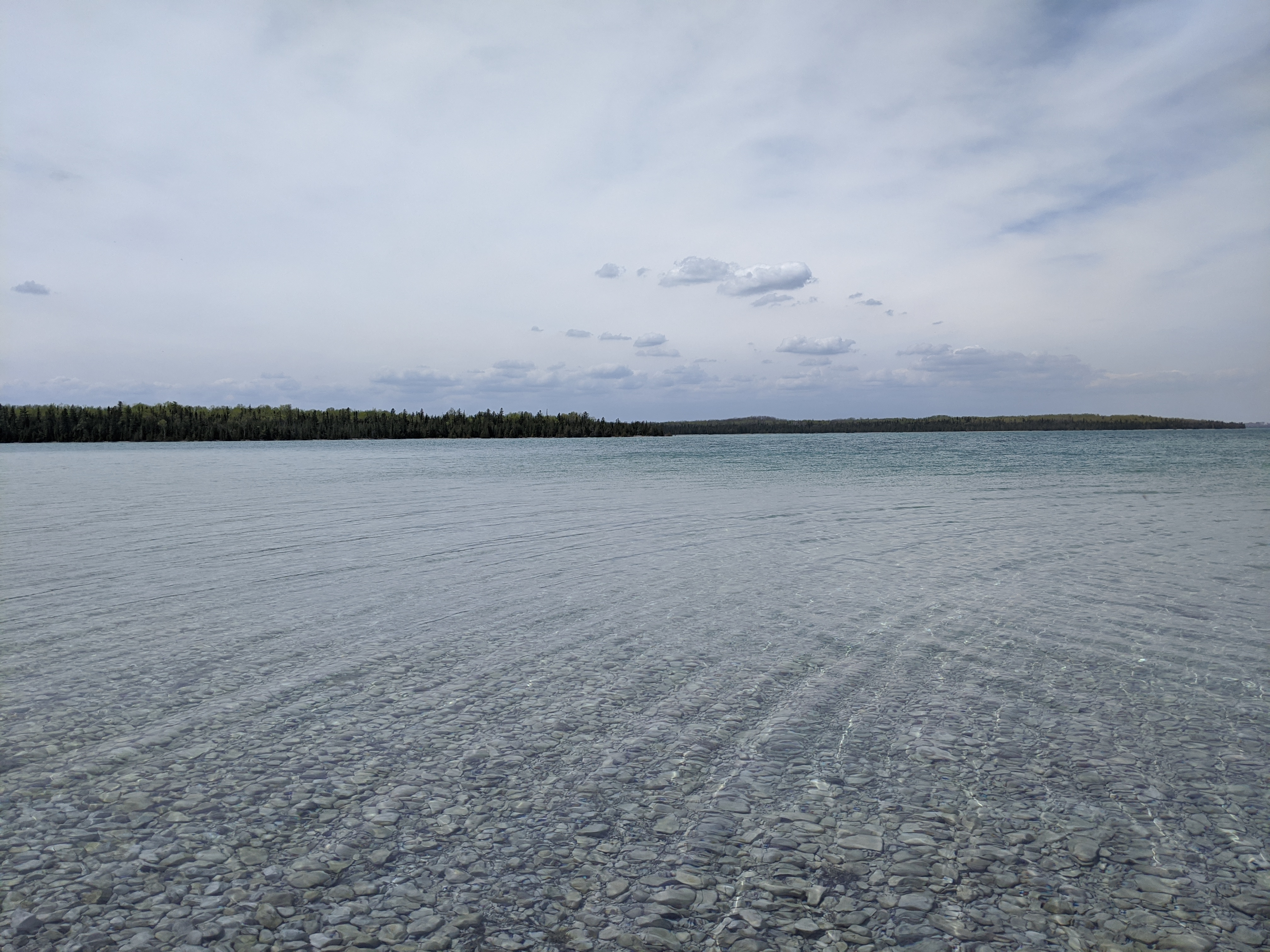
Lake Huron from park shore

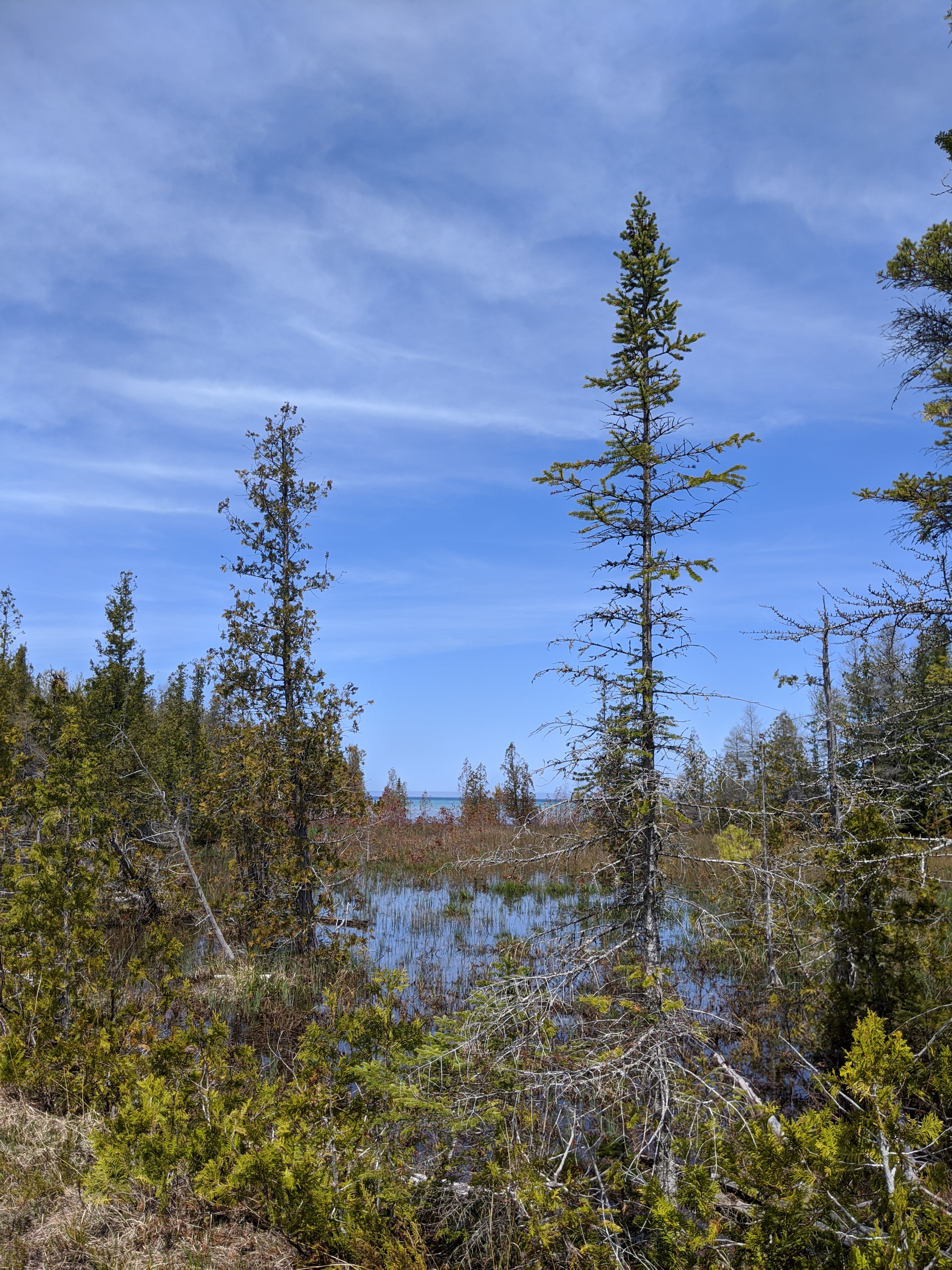
Cedar marsh

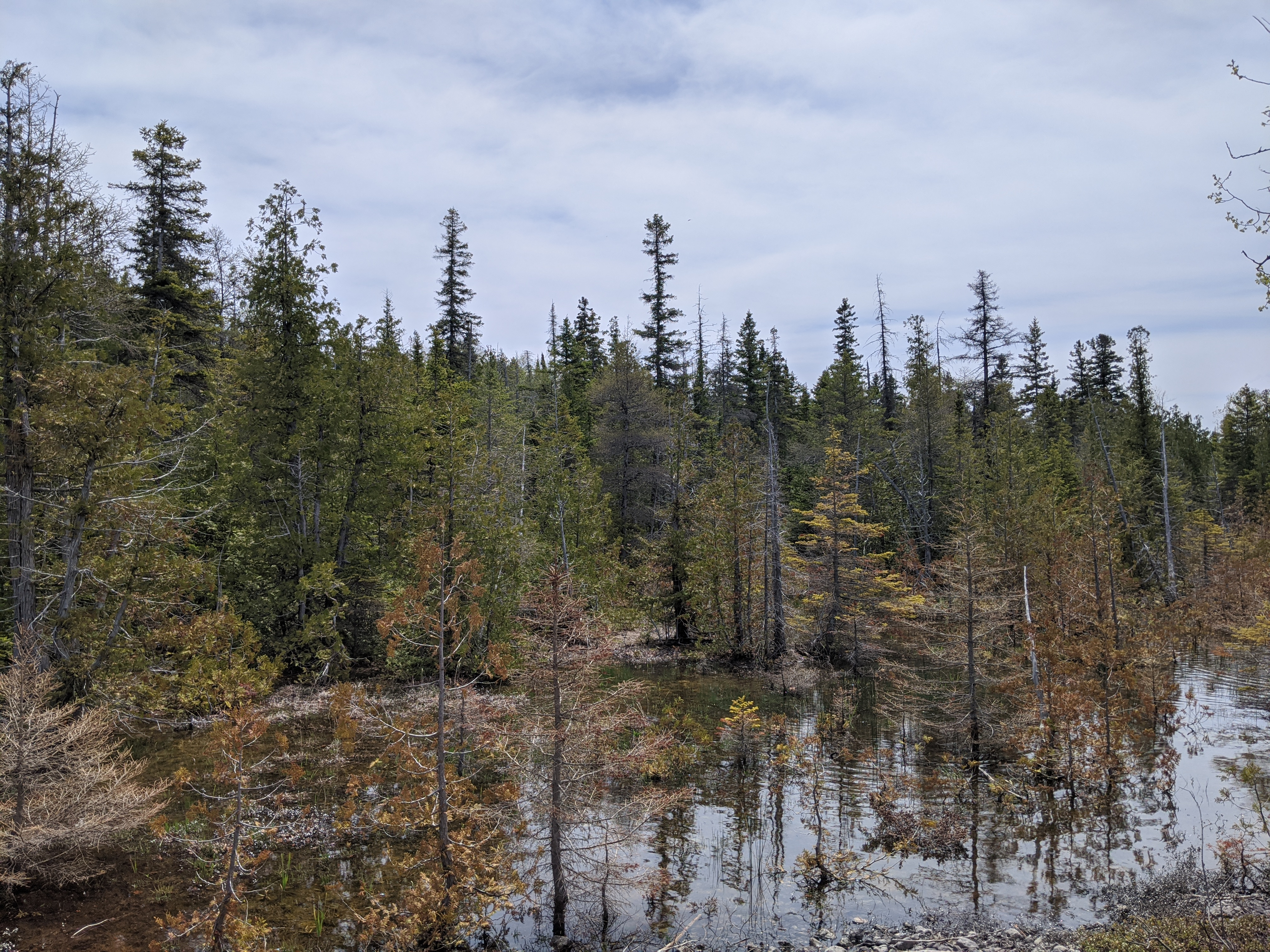
The park's conifer forest cover

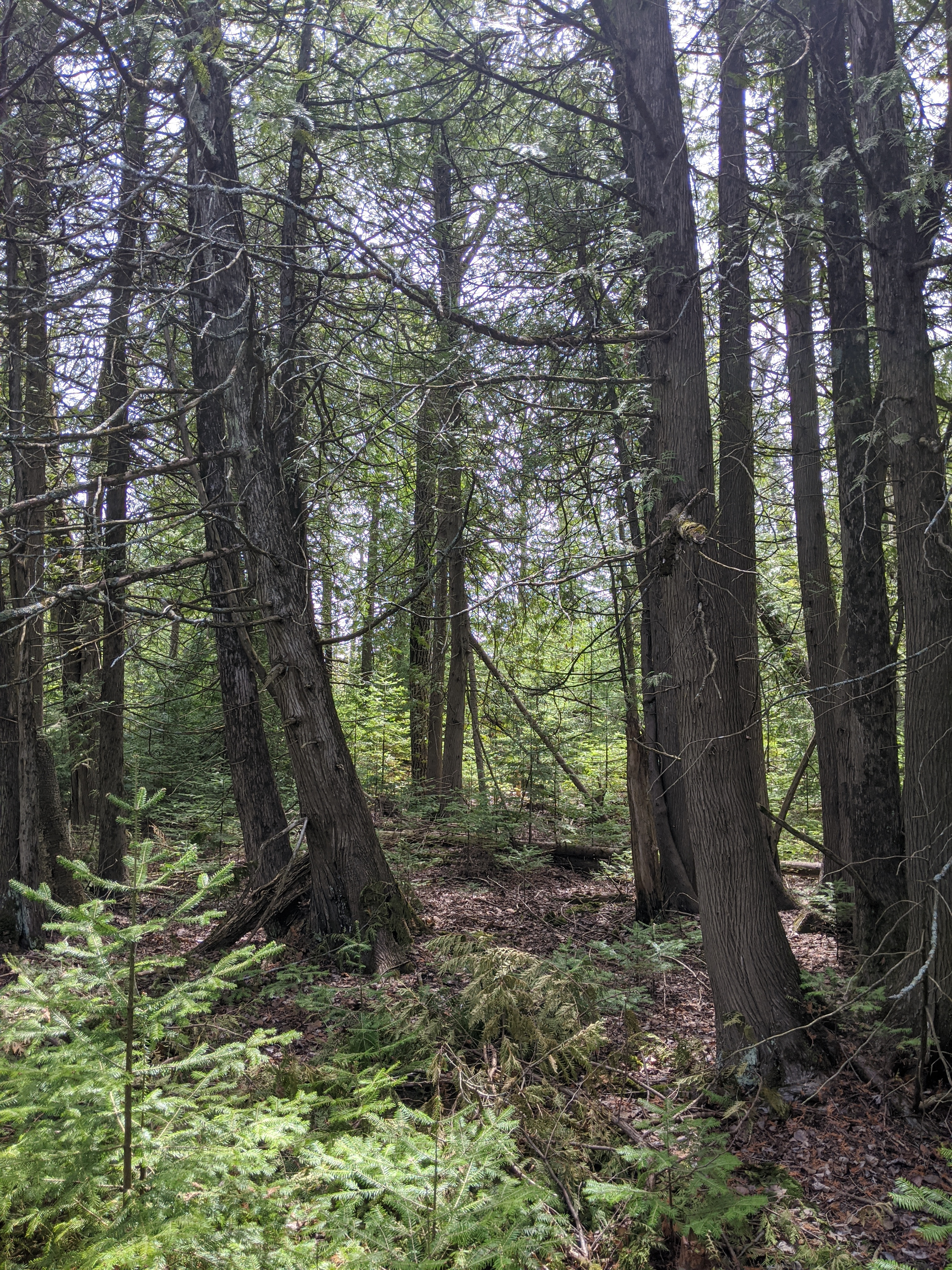
Under the canopy of the cedar forest
