= Coldwater Lake (Michigan) =

Lake in the state of Michigan, United States

- Location within Michigan Location within the United States
- Location: Branch County, Michigan
- Coordinates: 41°49′36″N 84°58′37″W
- Type: Lake
- Basin countries: United States
- Surface area: 1,610 acres (6.5 km^{2})
- Max. depth: 92.00 ft (28.04 m)
- Surface elevation: 981 ft (299 m)

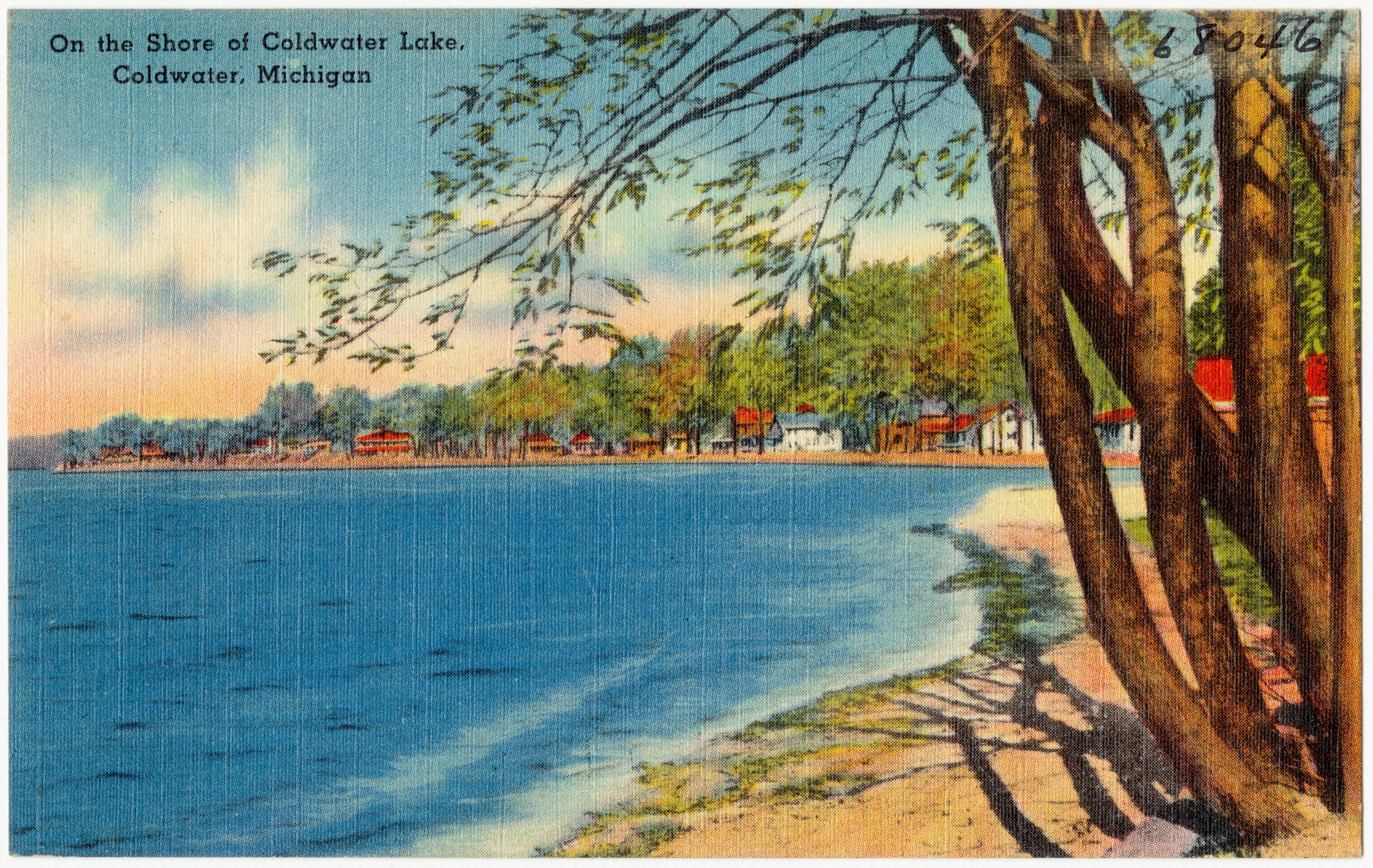
Artwork depicting the shore of Coldwater Lake c. 1930-1945

Coldwater Lake is a lake located in Branch County, Michigan. This lake is 1,610 acres in size. It is 92 feet (28 m) deep at its deepest point.

== Features ==
Coldwater Lake in Branch County, Michigan is a recreational lake surrounded by homes on the majority of its sides, and is located approximately 3 miles (4.8 km) north of the southern border of Michigan and 5 miles (8.0 km) south of Coldwater, Michigan. The lake feeds Coldwater River which runs north into the city of Coldwater.

The Lake has many channels connecting more residents to the lake, and one connecting it to a chain of 5 lakes that end in Quincy, Michigan. The lakes that are chained together to Coldwater Lake by these channels include East Long Lake, Wright Lake, Archer Lake, Middle Lake, and Marble Lake. The lake itself is a fairly shallow lake despite being 92 feet at its deepest, and has multiple sandbar and shallow areas.

Coldwater Lake also hosts yearly fishing contests where anglers can expect to catch a variety of fish including Black Crappie, Bluegill, Largemouth Bass, Northern Pike, Smallmouth Bass, Walleye and Yellow Perch.

On the southern portion of the lake is an island called Iyopawa Island that also has multiple residents and a nine-hole golf course in the center of the island.

Coldwater Lake also has a public boat landing and two more boat landings located at its two marinas.

== History ==
Coldwater Lake was hit during the 1965 Palm Sunday tornado outbreak, and lost multiple houses.
