= Cedar Hedge Lake =

Lake in Grand Traverse County, Michigan, United States of America

- Location within Michigan
- Location: Green Lake Township, Grand Traverse County, Michigan
- Coordinates: 44°40′15.82″N 85°46′58.99″W
- Type: Lake
- Primary outflows: Green Lake Inlet (Betsie River)
- Surface area: 195 acres (1 km^{2})
- Max. depth: 66 ft (20 m)
- Surface elevation: 827 ft (252 m)
- Islands: 1

Cedar Hedge Lake is a lake in Green Lake Township, Grand Traverse County. The lake is part of the Betsie River system.

== See also ==
- List of lakes of Michigan
