= Grant Township, Grand Traverse County, Michigan =

Grant Township, Michigan
- Civil township
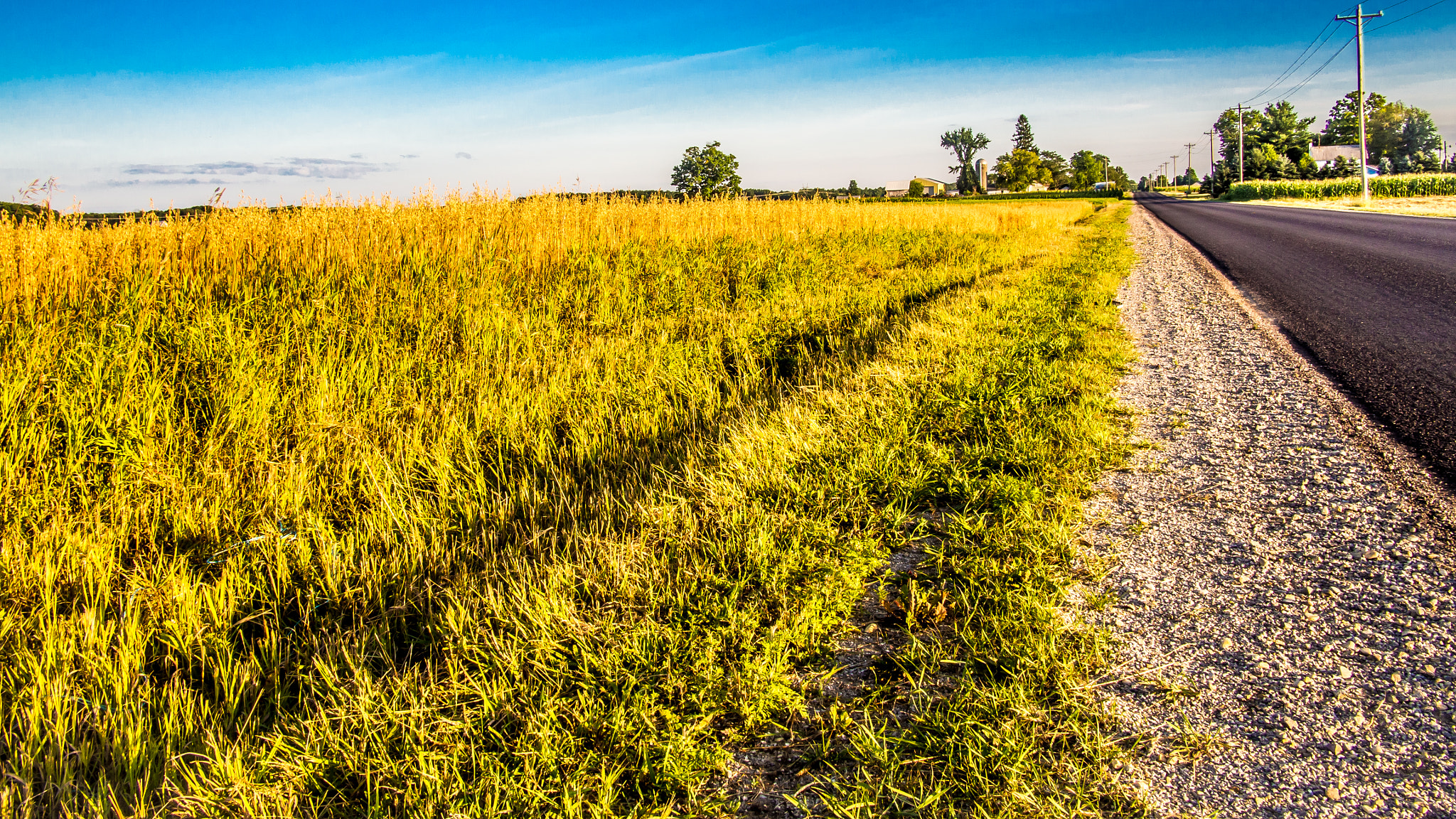
- A field along Karlin Road in Grant Township

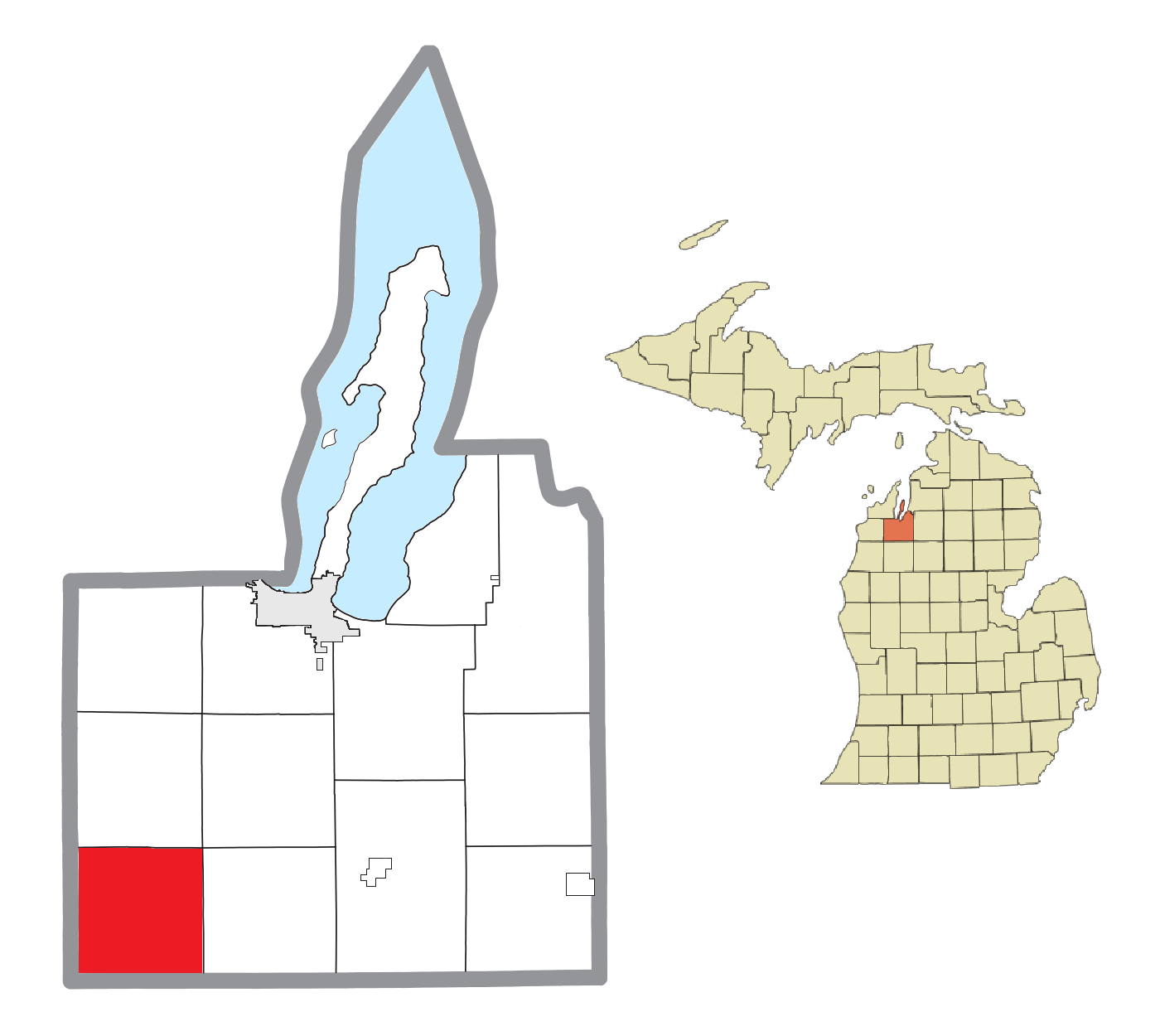
- Location within Grand Traverse County

- Location within the state of Michigan Grant Township (the United States)
- Coordinates: 44°34′16″N 85°46′11″W
- Country: United States
- State: Michigan
- County: Grand Traverse
- Organized: October 1866
- Named for: Ulysses S. Grant

Government
  - Supervisor: Douglas Moyer

Area
  - Total: 36.1 sq mi (93.5 km^{2})
  - Land: 35.4 sq mi (91.8 km^{2})
  - Water: 0.66 sq mi (1.7 km^{2})
- Elevation: 1,152 ft (351 m)

Population (2020)
  - Total: 1,212
  - Density: 27/sq mi (10.3/km^{2})
- Time zone: UTC-5 (Eastern (EST))
  - Summer (DST): UTC-4 (EDT)
- ZIP code(s): 49620 (Buckley); 49637 (Grawn); 49643 (Interlochen); 49683 (Thompsonville)
- Area code: 231
- FIPS code: 26-34240
- GNIS feature ID: 1626378
- Website: https://grant-grdtraverse.com/

Grant Township is a civil township of Grand Traverse County in the U.S. state of Michigan. As of the 2020 census, the township population was 1,212, a slight increase from 1,066 at the 2010 census. Grant Township is part of the Traverse City metropolitan area.

== History ==
Grant Township was organized from Township 25 north, of Range 12 west, of old Traverse Township in October 1866. The township is named after Ulysses S. Grant.

== Geography ==
According to the United States Census Bureau, the township has a total area of 36.1 square miles (93 km^{2}), of which 35.5 square miles (92 km^{2}) is land and 0.6 square miles (1.6 km^{2}) (1.77%) is water.

Grant Township forms the southwestern corner of Grand Traverse County, and has borders with Benzie, Manistee, and Wexford counties.

The primary source of the Betsie River, at Green Lake, is within Grant Township.

Grant Township contains no state trunkline highways.

=== Adjacent townships ===
- Green Lake Township, Grand Traverse County (north)
- Blair Township, Grand Traverse County (northeast)
- Mayfield Township, Grand Traverse County (east)
- Hanover Township, Wexford County (southeast)
- Wexford Township, Wexford County (south)
- Cleon Township, Manistee County (southwest)
- Colfax Township, Benzie County (west)
- Inland Township, Benzie County (northwest)

== Communities ==
- Karlin is an unincorporated community within the township.
- Pavlovic Corner was a small community within the township. The community was located at 44°34′8.01″N 85°45′12.27″W.
- Twin Mountain was a railroad stop along the Manistee and North-Eastern Railroad, established in 1888.

== Demographics ==
As of the census of 2000, there were 947 people, 369 households, and 274 families residing in the township. The population density was 26.7 inhabitants per square mile (10.3/km^{2}). There were 467 housing units at an average density of 13.2 per square mile (5.1/km^{2}). The racial makeup of the township was 98.10% White, 0.63% Native American, 0.11% Asian, 0.95% from other races, and 0.21% from two or more races. Hispanic or Latino of any race were 1.16% of the population.

There were 369 households, out of which 32.5% had children under the age of 18 living with them, 62.3% were married couples living together, 7.0% had a female householder with no husband present, and 25.7% were non-families. 22.2% of all households were made up of individuals, and 7.9% had someone living alone who was 65 years of age or older. The average household size was 2.57 and the average family size was 2.98.

In the township the population was spread out, with 26.2% under the age of 18, 5.5% from 18 to 24, 27.8% from 25 to 44, 26.5% from 45 to 64, and 14.0% who were 65 years of age or older. The median age was 40 years. For every 100 females, there were 103.2 males. For every 100 females age 18 and over, there were 105.6 males.

The median income for a household in the township was $37,269, and the median income for a family was $42,000. Males had a median income of $34,196 versus $20,625 for females. The per capita income for the township was $17,282. About 3.1% of families and 6.3% of the population were below the poverty line, including 5.3% of those under age 18 and 9.8% of those age 65 or over.
