= Betsie River =

River in United States of America

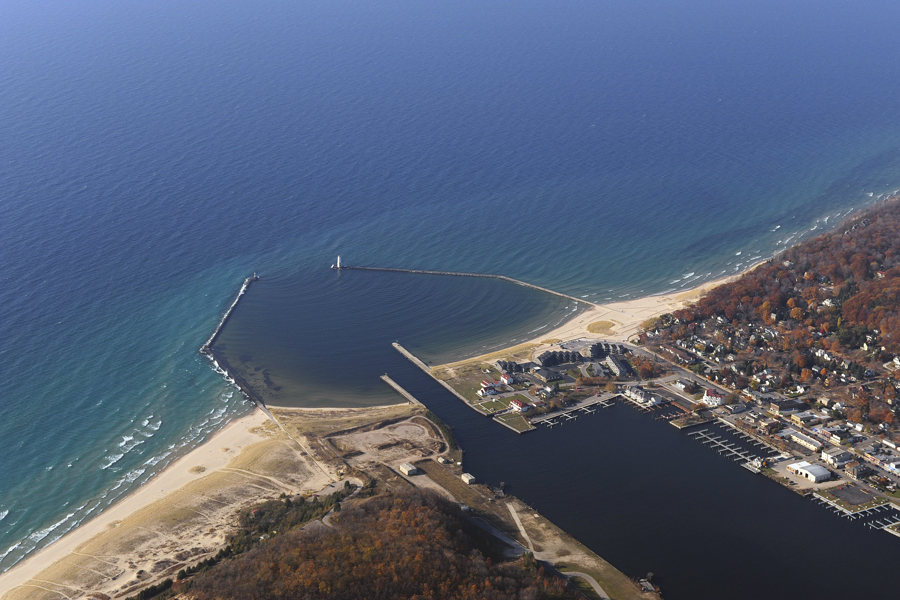
- Mouth of the Betsie River at Lake Michigan, in Frankfort

- Location of mouth

Physical characteristics
- Source
  - location: Green Lake near Interlochen
  - coordinates: 44.5919459°N 85.794522°W
- Mouth
  - location: Lake Michigan at Frankfort
  - coordinates: 44.6291652°N 86.2459287°W
- Length: 54 mi (87 km)

The Betsie River (/bɛtsiː/ BET-see) is a 54.0-mile-long (86.9 km) river in the U.S. state of Michigan. The river is located in the northwestern Lower Peninsula of the state, flowing into Lake Michigan at Frankfort. The river's course is mostly within Benzie County, (which takes its name from a variant pronunciation of the river), although the river rises in western Grand Traverse County and flows briefly through northern Manistee County.

The river widens to form Betsie Lake before emptying into Lake Michigan between Frankfort and Elberta. The Betsie River is a part of Michigan's Natural Rivers Program.

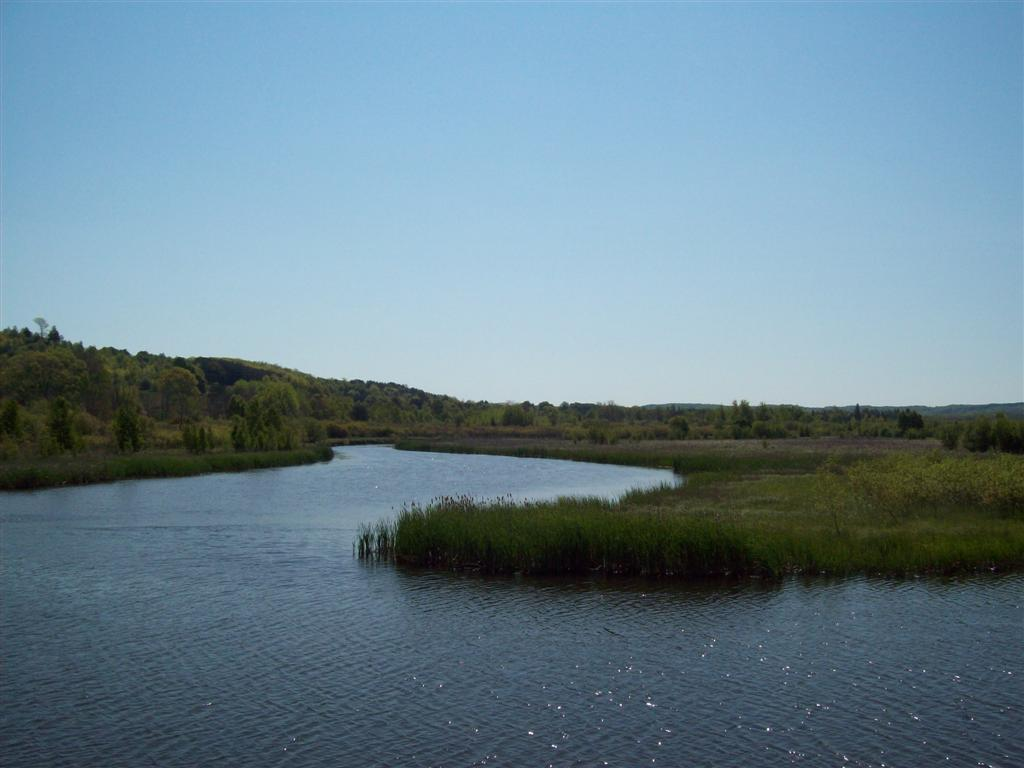
Betsie River Wetland Delta near Elberta

== Etymology ==
The name is derived from the French la rivière aux Bec-scies, meaning river of sawbill ducks (bec-scie). A corruption of this pronunciation led to the name of Benzie County. Other alternate historical names include the following:

- Aug-sig-o-sebe
- Aux Buscies River
- Betsey's River
- Benzie River
- Black Robe River
- Gay-she-say-ing
- Riviere du Pere Marquette
- Sawbill Ducks River
- Shelldrake Ducks River

== Course ==
While most sources indicate the river rises as the outflow of Green Lake in southwestern Grand Traverse County, some consider it navigable immediately south of US-31 from Tullers Lake into Green Lake. Another tributary of the river flows directly out of northern Duck Lake and into northern Green Lake, connecting with the aforementioned Tullers Lake Outlet. Although not considered part of the Betsie River today, older maps of the area do say so. Green Lake straddles the boundary between Grant Township on the south and Green Lake Township on the north between Karlin and Interlochen. Several nearby lakes, including Duck Lake and its tributaries, drain into Green Lake.

The river winds southwesterly from Green Lake into eastern Benzie County, and then briefly into northern Manistee County before turning northerly back into Benzie County. A dam on the river forms Homestead Pond, after which is flows mostly west and slightly north to Lake Michigan.

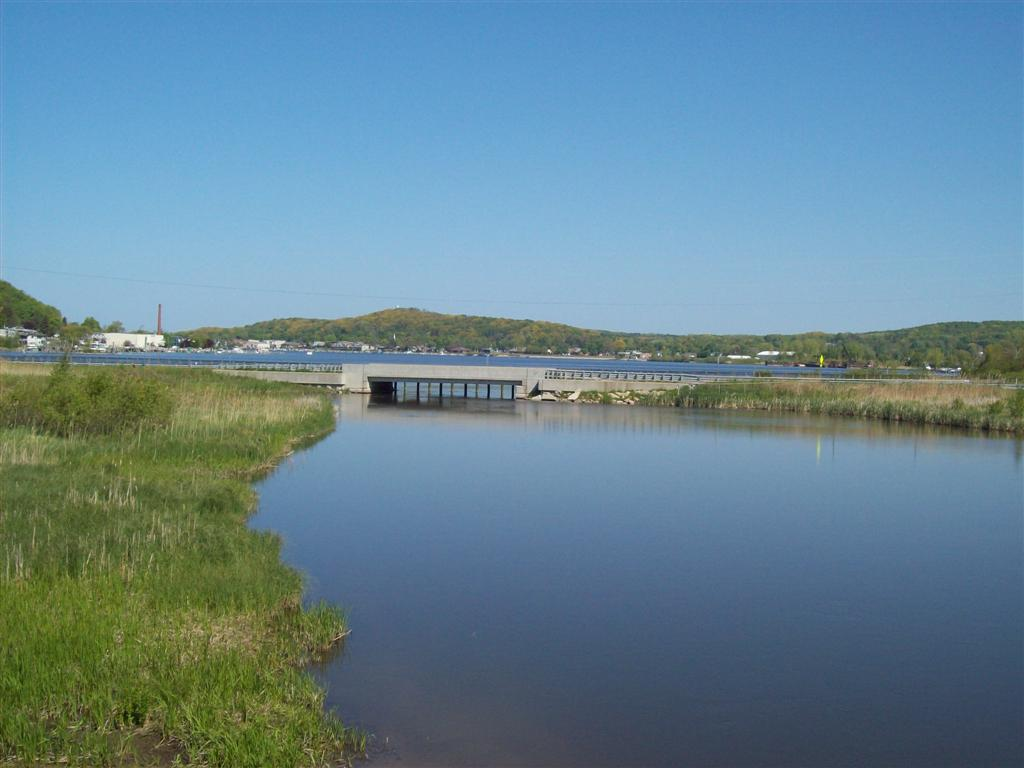
Betsie River emptying into Lake Betsie, Elberta, MI (bridge shown is M-22 crossing the river outlet)

== Drainage basin ==
The Betsie River drains an area of approximately 155,026 acres (627.37 km^{2}) in three counties. The drainage basin include about 93 miles (150 km) of linear stream, 52 miles (84 km) of which is part of the mainstream.

== Dams ==
- Homestead Dam 44°35′48″N 86°04′48″W was mostly removed in 1974 and currently acts as a lamprey barrier. It impounds little water and does not impede salmon migrations. The remains of the dam are now sometimes called "Homestead Falls". The dam was a power generating facility formerly owned by Consumers Energy.
- Grass Lake Dam, approximately 4 miles (6 km) downstream from Green Lake, forms an approximately 90-acre (36 ha) impoundment. The dam was constructed in 1951 to improve waterfowl habitat and northern pike fishing. The dam was installed by the state Wildlife Division and created a 482 acres (195 ha) waterfowl flooding.
- Thompsonville Dam was an old power dam that failed in the spring of 1989 and was subsequently removed. Prior to its removal, the dam posed a barrier to salmon migration. Salmon and trout have access to the entire mainstream of the river, even above the Grass Lake Dam.

== Bridges ==
Below is a list of public crossings of the Betsie River:

Route	Type	Municipality	County	Location
M-22 (Frankfort Avenue)	State highway	Benzonia Township	Benzie	44°37′13.1″N 86°13′18.1″W
Betsie Valley Trailway (west)	Paved trail	Benzonia Township	Benzie	44°37′09.2″N 86°13′13.5″W
River Road (west)	County road	Crystal Lake Township	Benzie	44°37′05.9″N 86°10′04.0″W
River Road (east)	County road	Benzonia Township	Benzie	44°37′05.2″N 86°07′24.0″W
Grace Road	County road	Benzonia Township	Benzie	44°36′16.0″N 86°06′44.3″W
US 31/M-115 (Benzie Highway)	State highway	Benzonia Township	Benzie	44°36′02.2″N 86°07′24.0″W
M-115 (west)	State highway	Weldon Township	Benzie	44°33′26.3″N 86°03′12.3″W
County Line Road	County road	Weldon/Springdale township	Benzie/Manistee line	44°30′52.0″N 86°02′40.6″W
Psutka Road	County road	Springdale Township	Manistee	44°29′46.4″N 86°01′47.7″W
Kurick Road	County road	Springdale Township	Manistee	44°30′05.3″N 85°58′45.2″W
M-115 (east)	State highway	Springdale Township	Manistee	44°30′26.9″N 85°58′06.3″W
Lindy Road	County road	Weldon Township	Benzie	44°31′13.8″N 85°57′41.5″W
Wolf Road	County road	Weldon Township	Benzie	44°31′43.1″N 85°56′55.8″W
Betsie Valley Trailway (east)	Paved trail	Weldon Township	Benzie	44°31′48.6″N 85°56′51.6″W
King Road	County road	Weldon Township	Benzie	44°32′32.1″N 85°56′32.9″W
South Thompsonville Highway	County road	Colfax Township	Benzie	44°37′47.2″N 85°56′16.9″W
South Carmean Road	County road	Colfax Township	Benzie	44°33′19.6″N 85°55′05.8″W
Wallin Road	County road	Colfax Township	Benzie	44°34′13.7″N 85°53′35.0″W
Nostwick Road	County road	Colfax Township	Benzie	44°34′23.4″N 85°53′16.7″W
South Reynolds Road	County road	Colfax Township	Benzie	44°34′28.8″N 85°52′40.2″W
Betsie River Road	County road	Grant Township	Grand Traverse	44°35′34.7″N 85°47′48.0″W
Diamond Park Road	County road	Green Lake Township	Grand Traverse	44°37′59.5″N 85°46′55.2″W
J. Maddy Parkway	County road	Green Lake Township	Grand Traverse	44°38′29.2″N 85°46′02.2″W
Birch Road	County road	Green Lake Township	Grand Traverse	44°39′14.5″N 85°45′04.6″W
US 31	State highway	Green Lake Township	Grand Traverse	44°39′30.9″N 85°44′59.7″W

== Tributaries ==
- Betsie Lake 44°37′42″N 86°13′47″W
- Crystal Lake Outlet 44°37′32″N 86°08′18″W
  - Crystal Lake
    - Cold Creek 44°37′47″N 86°05′46″W in Beulah
- Rice Creek 44°36′19″N 86°06′51″W
- Dair Creek 44°33′05″N 86°03′15″W
- Little Betsie River 44°32′01″N 85°56′44″W
- Pickerel Creek 44°35′29″N 85°50′25″W
  - Twin Lake 44°34′19″N 85°49′46″W
  - Upper Twin Lake 44°34′19″N 85°49′17″W
- Grass Lake 44°36′30″N 85°51′03″W
- Mud Lake 44°34′31″N 85°47′55″W
- Green Lake 44°36′41″N 85°47′03″W
  - Bridge Lake 44°38′21″N 85°47′07″W
  - Tullers Lake 44°39′15″N 85°46′43″W
  - Cedar Hedge Lake 44°40′12″N 85°47′04″W
  - Mud Lake 44°38′36″N 85°45′28″W
  - Duck Lake 44°37′53″N 85°44′42″W
    - Horton Creek
    - Brigham Creek 44°37′18″N 85°43′42″W
    - Mason Creek 44°37′51″N 85°43′26″W
      - Weidenhamer Swamp 44°37′35″N 85°36′10″W
    - Tonawanda Lake 44°39′03″N 85°45′07″W
      - Ellis Lake 44°39′47″N 85°44′54″W
        - Saunders Lake 44°40′17″N 85°43′56″W
