= Duck Lake (Grand Traverse County, Michigan) =

Lake in the state of Michigan, United States

- Lake Wahbekaness, Betsey Lake
- Location within Michigan
- Location: Green Lake Township, Grand Traverse County, Michigan
- Coordinates: 44°37′45.59″N 85°45′5.63″W
- Type: Lake
- Primary inflows: Upper Betsie River, Brigham Creek, Horton Creek, Mason Creek
- Primary outflows: Betsie River (Green Lake)
- Surface area: 1,930 acres (8 km^{2})
- Max. depth: 98 ft (30 m)
- Surface elevation: 837 ft (255 m)
- Islands: none
- Settlements: Interlochen, Duck Lake Peninsula

Duck Lake (also known as Lake Wahbekaness and formerly Betsey Lake) is a large lake in the Lower Peninsula of the U.S. state of Michigan. Located within Green Lake Township, Grand Traverse County, Duck Lake is one of two lakes the forms the isthmus of Interlochen, the other being Green Lake. Duck Lake and Green Lake form part of the headwaters of the Betsie River, which flows west from Green Lake through Benzie County to Lake Michigan at Frankfort and Elberta. Duck Lake is about 9.5 miles (15.3 km) southwest of Traverse City.

Also between Duck Lake and Green Lake are Interlochen State Park and Interlochen Center for the Arts, a prestigious boarding school.

== See also ==
- List of lakes in Michigan
