= Green Lake Airport =

Public use airport in Interlochen, Michigan

- IATA: none; ICAO: none; FAA LID: Y88

Summary
- Airport type: Public
- Owner: Green Lake Township
- Serves: Interlochen, Michigan
- Time zone: UTC−05:00 (-5)
  - Summer (DST): UTC−04:00 (-4)
- Elevation AMSL: 866 ft (264 m)
- Coordinates: 44°36′22″N 085°45′30″W
- Interactive map of Green Lake Airport

Runways
Direction	Length		Surface
Direction	ft	m	Surface
5/23	2,800	853	Turf
16/34	1,700	518	Turf

Statistics (2021)
- Aircraft operations: 400
- Based Aircraft: 4
- Source: Federal Aviation Administration

Green Lake Airport (FAA LID: Y88) is a public use airport located three nautical miles (6 km) south of the central business district of Interlochen, a community in Green Lake Township, Grand Traverse County, Michigan, United States. The airport is owned by Green Lake Township.

The airport is open to the public from April to October, but it closes from November to March.

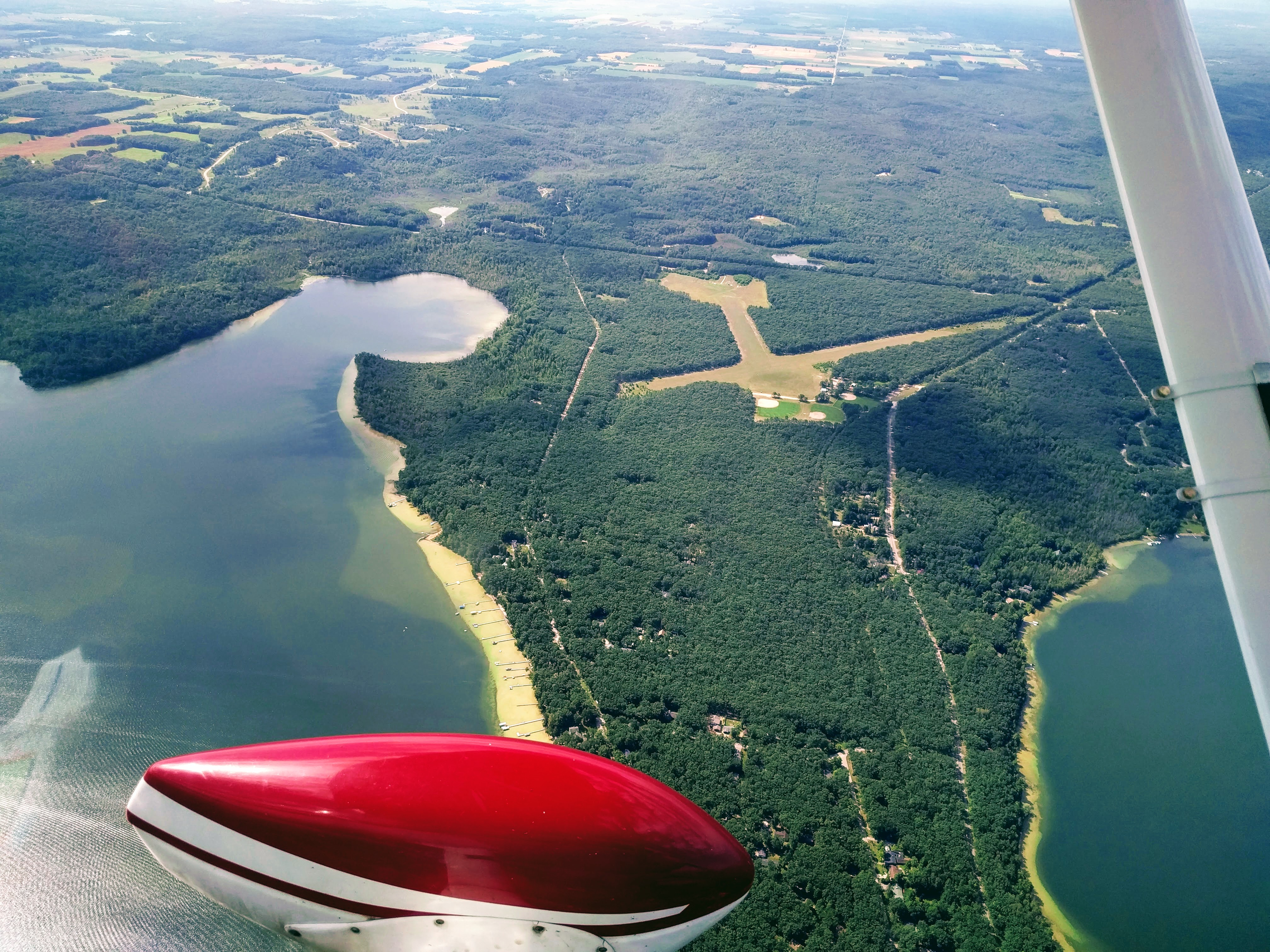
Green Lake Airport aerial

== Facilities and aircraft ==
Green Lake Airport has two runways with turf surfaces: runway 5/23 is 2,800 by 170 feet (853 x 52 m), and runway 16/34 is 1,700 by 170 feet (518 x 52 m). Use of runway 16/34 is prohibited when the athletic fields at the end of the airport are in use.

The airport does not have a fixed-base operator, and no fuel is available. However, aircraft parking is available.

For the 12-month period ending December 31, 2021, the airport had 400 general aviation aircraft operations, an average of 33 per month. For the same time period, 4 aircraft are based at the airport: 2 single-engine airplanes and 2 ultralights.

== See also ==
- List of airports in Michigan
