= Yuba Airport =

- IATA: none; ICAO: none; FAA LID: 34U

Summary
- Airport type: Public use
- Owner: Dorance Amos
- Serves: Elk Rapids, Michigan
- Elevation AMSL: 645 ft / 197 m
- Coordinates: 44°50′20″N 085°25′52″W
- Interactive map of Yuba Airport

Runways
Direction	Length		Surface
Direction	ft	m	Surface
18/36	2,975	907	Turf

Statistics (2006)
- Aircraft operations: 100
- Sources: FAA, Michigan Airport Directory

Yuba Airport (FAA LID: 34U) is a privately owned, public use airport in Grand Traverse County, Michigan, United States. It is located four nautical miles (5 mi, 7 km) south of the central business district of Elk Rapids, Michigan.

== Facilities and aircraft ==
Yuba Airport covers an area of 80 acres (32 ha) at an elevation of 645 feet (197 m) above mean sea level. It has one runway designated 18/36 with a turf surface measuring 2,975 by 100 feet (907 x 30 m). For the 12-month period ending December 31, 2006, the airport had 100 general aviation aircraft operations.
