= Springdale Township, Michigan =

- Township
- Location within Michigan Location within the United States
- Coordinates: 44°27′56″N 85°59′41″W
- Country: United States
- State: Michigan
- County: Manistee

Area
  - Total: 35.6 sq mi (92 km^{2})
  - Land: 35.4 sq mi (92 km^{2})
  - Water: 0.2 sq mi (0.52 km^{2})
- Elevation: 768 ft (234 m)

Population (2020)
  - Total: 849
  - Density: 24/sq mi (9.3/km^{2})
- Time zone: UTC-5 (Eastern (EST))
  - Summer (DST): UTC-4 (EDT)
- ZIP Codes: 49683 (Thompsonville); 49614 (Bear Lake); 49645 (Kaleva)
- FIPS code: 26-101-75680
- GNIS feature ID: 1627107
- Website: www.springdaletownship.org

Springdale Township is a civil township of Manistee County in the U.S. state of Michigan. The population was 849 at the 2020 census.

== Geography ==
The township is in northern Manistee County and is bordered to the north by Benzie County. According to the United States Census Bureau, the township has a total area of 35.6 square miles (92 km^{2}), of which 35.4 square miles (92 km^{2}) are land and 0.2 square miles (0.5 km^{2}), or 0.56%, are water. The Betsie River, a tributary of Lake Michigan, flows east to west across the northern part of the township.

== Communities ==
Bec Scies was a settlement in Springdale Township established in 1881.

== Demographics ==
As of the census of 2000, there were 730 people, 324 households, and 215 families residing in the township. The population density was 20.5 per square mile (7.9/km^{2}). There were 567 housing units at an average density of 15.9 per square mile (6.1/km^{2}). The racial makeup of the township was 97.67% White, 1.23% Native American, 0.55% from other races, and 0.55% from two or more races. Hispanic or Latino of any race were 2.19% of the population.

There were 324 households, out of which 24.7% had children under the age of 18 living with them, 51.9% were married couples living together, 10.5% had a female householder with no husband present, and 33.6% were non-families. 28.4% of all households were made up of individuals, and 11.7% had someone living alone who was 65 years of age or older. The average household size was 2.25 and the average family size was 2.72.

In the township the population was spread out, with 21.6% under the age of 18, 6.4% from 18 to 24, 24.9% from 25 to 44, 29.7% from 45 to 64, and 17.3% who were 65 years of age or older. The median age was 43 years. For every 100 females, there were 104.5 males. For every 100 females age 18 and over, there were 100.0 males.

The median income for a household in the township was $29,417, and the median income for a family was $31,667. Males had a median income of $31,563 versus $22,500 for females. The per capita income for the township was $16,612. About 13.6% of families and 22.2% of the population were below the poverty line, including 48.6% of those under age 18 and 9.8% of those age 65 or over.
