= Karlin, Michigan =

- Unincorporated community
- Location within Michigan Location within the United States
- Coordinates: 44°34′42″N 85°47′00″W
- Country: United States
- State: Michigan
- County: Grand Traverse
- Township: Grant
- Settled: 1897
- Elevation: 892 ft (272 m)
- Time zone: UTC-5 (Eastern (EST))
  - Summer (DST): UTC-4 (EDT)
- ZIP code(s): 49643 (Interlochen)
- Area code: 231
- GNIS feature ID: 629463

Karlin (/kɑːrlɪn/ KARR-linn) is an unincorporated community in the U.S. state of Michigan. Part of Grant Township, Karlin is within Grand Traverse County, and is considered part of Northern Michigan. As an unincorporated community, Karlin has no legally defined boundaries or population statistics of its own.

== History ==
An extension of the Manistee and North-Eastern Railroad northeast of Nessen City was completed in 1890. A station was opened 5 miles (8.0 km) south of Interlochen known as Horicon, with a post office opening in 1897. Edward Wilson was the first postmaster at Horicon. The name of the community was changed in 1903 to Karlin, after Karlín, Austria-Hungary, from whence a number of local settlers originated. The railroad line running through Karlin was removed in 1934.

== See also ==
- List of U.S. places named after non-U.S. places
