= Interlochen, Michigan =

- Census-designated place (CDP) & unincorporated community
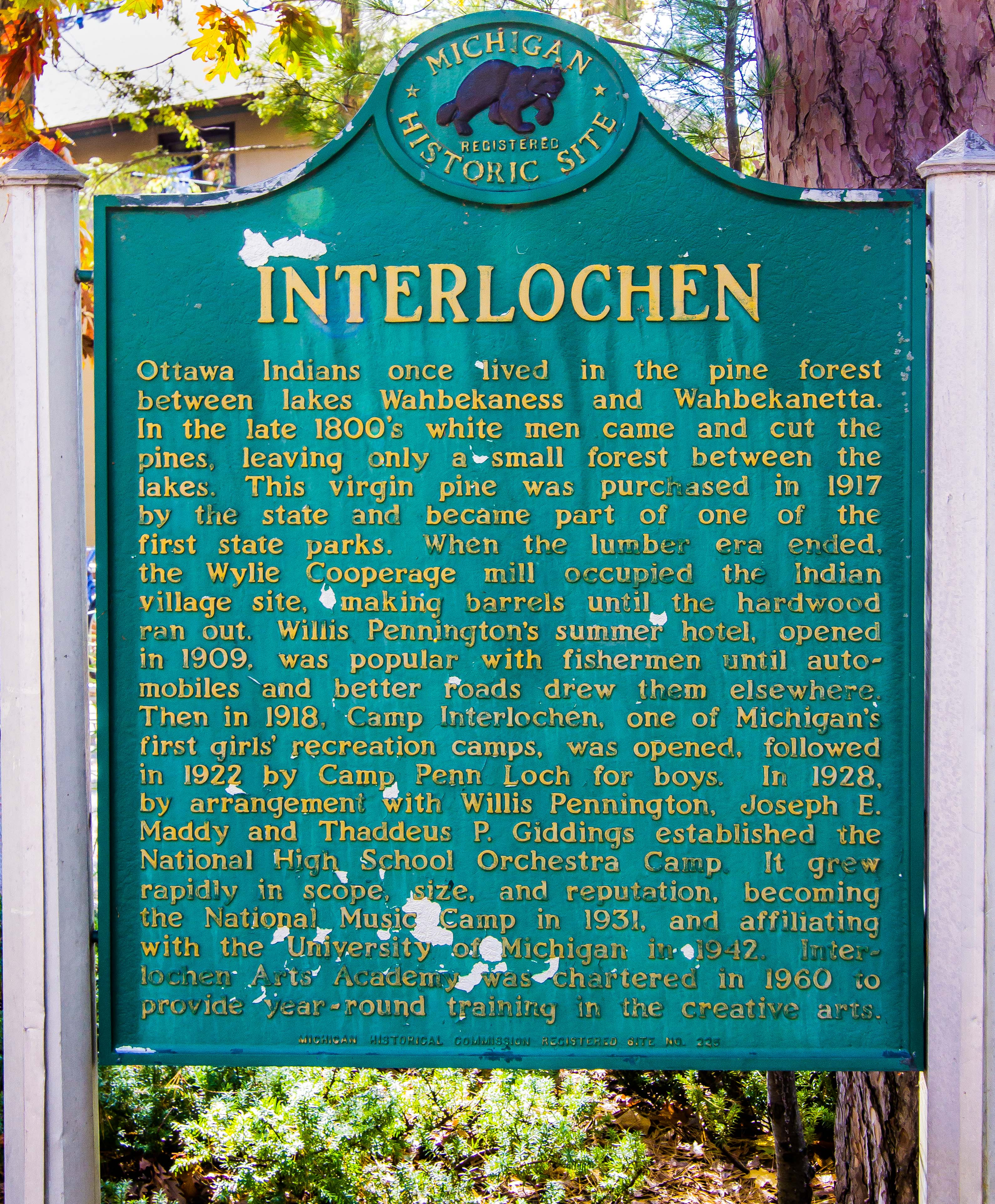
- Interlochen Historical Marker
- Motto: "Between the Lakes"
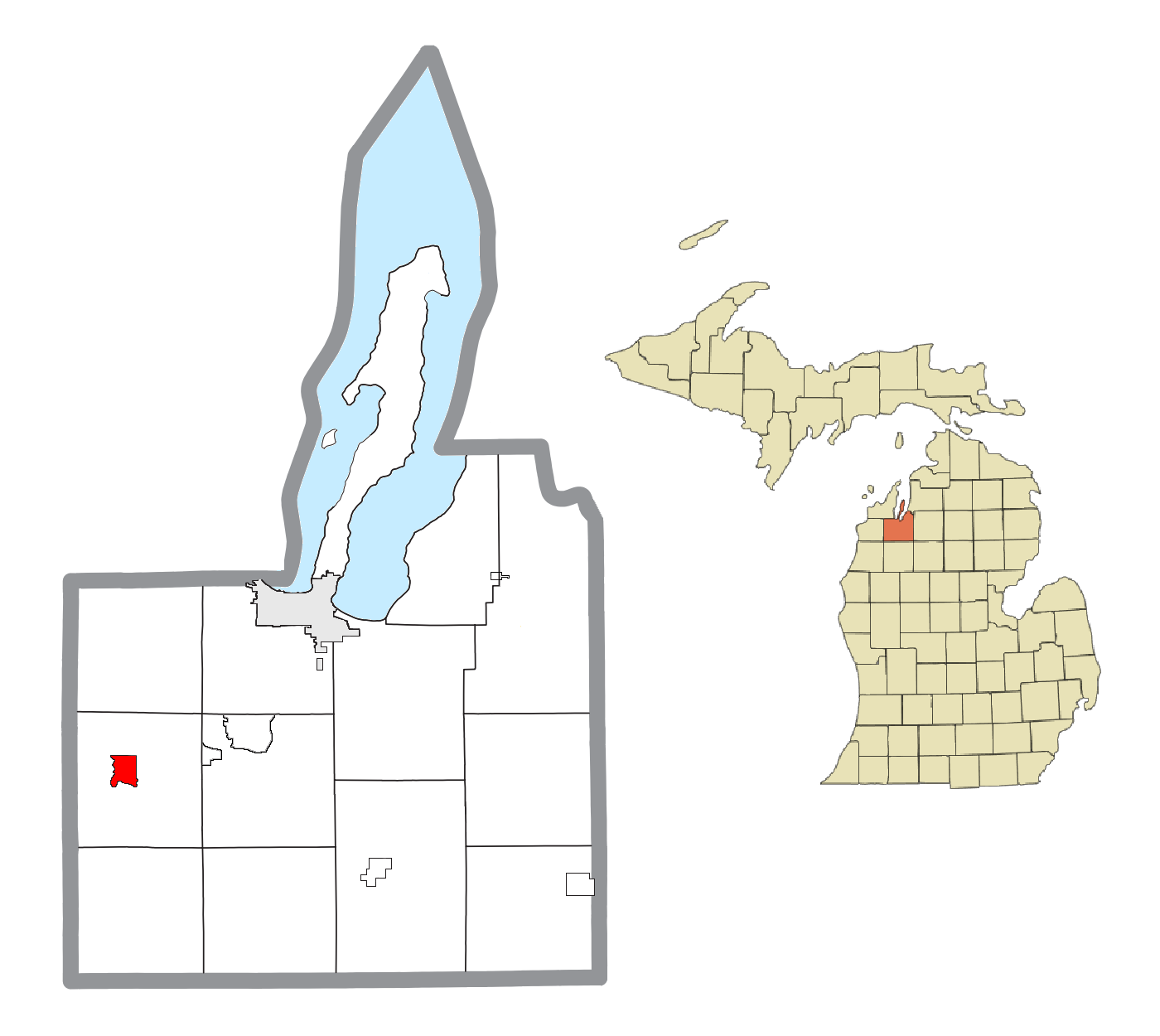
- Location within Grand Traverse County

- Location within the state of Michigan Location within the United States
- Coordinates: 44°38′43″N 85°46′02″W
- Country: United States
- State: Michigan
- County: Grand Traverse
- Township: Green Lake

Area
  - Total: 1.27 sq mi (3.29 km^{2})
  - Land: 1.24 sq mi (3.21 km^{2})
  - Water: 0.031 sq mi (0.08 km^{2})
- Elevation: 840 ft (256 m)

Population (2020)
  - Total: 694
  - Density: 560/sq mi (216/km^{2})
- Time zone: UTC-5 (Eastern (EST))
  - Summer (DST): UTC-4 (EDT)
- ZIP Code: 49643
- Area code: 231
- GNIS feature ID: 629053
- FIPS code: 26-40800
- Website: Chamber of Commerce

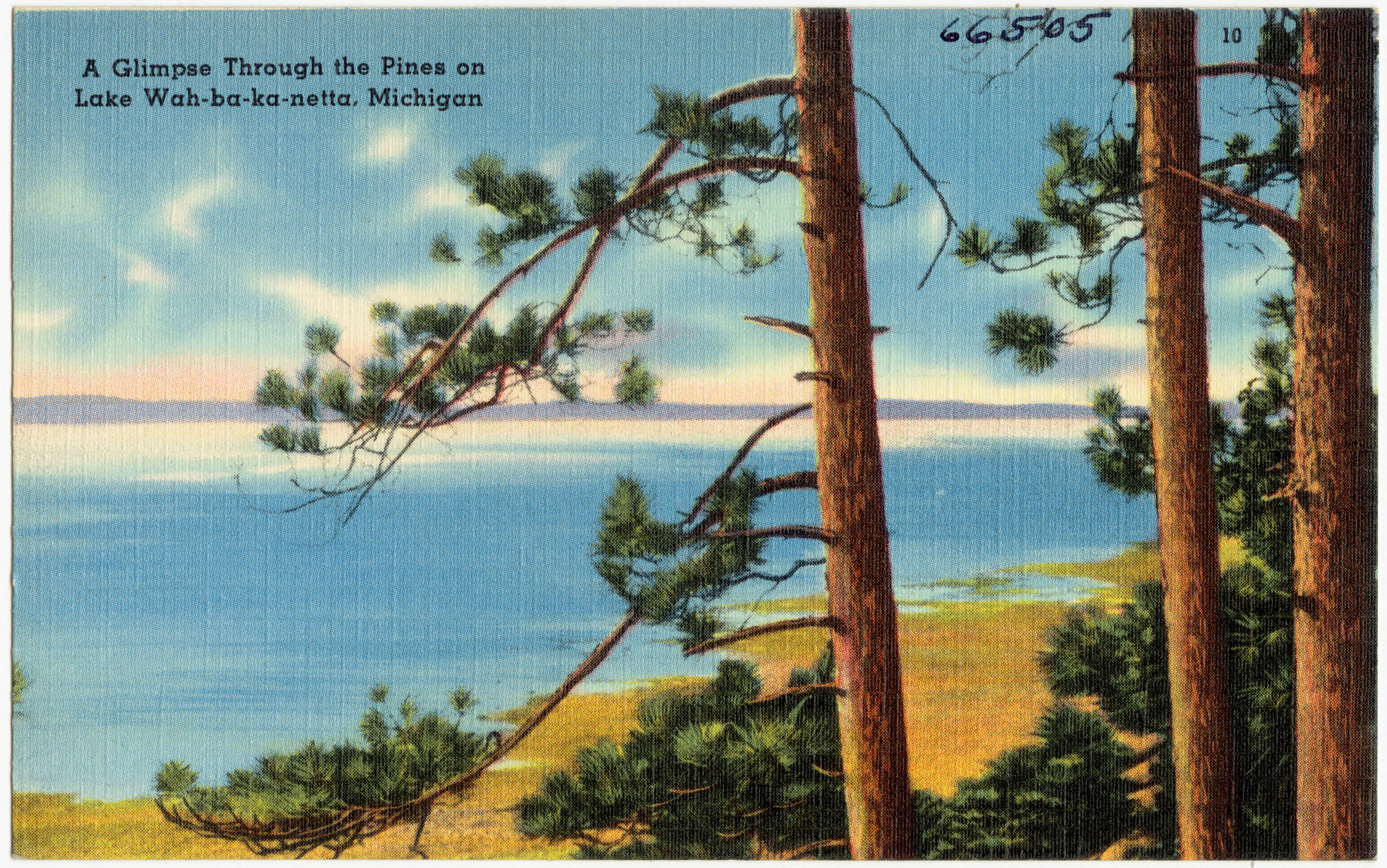
Lake Wah-ba-ka-netta, now Green Lake

Interlochen (/ˈɪntərlɒkən/ IN-tər-lok-ən) is an unincorporated community and census-designated place (CDP) in Grand Traverse County in the U.S. state of Michigan. At the 2020 census, the population was 694, up from 583 at the 2010 census. The community is located within Green Lake Township, and is home to a post office operating with ZIP Code 49643.

The community is home to the Interlochen Center for the Arts and also contains Interlochen State Park between the shores of Duck Lake and Green Lake. Interlochen is a designated Michigan State Historic Site.

== History ==
Interlochen takes its name from the Latin "inter", meaning "between", and the Scottish Gaelic "lochan", meaning lakes.

Before the arrival of European settlers, members of the Odawa people lived between the lakes they called Wahbekaness and Wahbekanetta (now named Duck Lake and Green Lake, respectively). Beginning in the late 19th century, European settlers began logging and fishing industries in the area, and founded the small village of Wylie, one mile south of present-day Interlochen. Because of logging, the Manistee and North-Eastern Railroad (owned by the Buckley and Douglas Lumber Company of Manistee) extended its line north from Nessen City and arrived between the lakes in the fall of 1889. Similarly, the Chicago and West Michigan Railway extended its line north from Baldwin on its way to Traverse City in 1890. The two lines crossed in current-day downtown Interlochen where a depot and interlocking tower were located. The original townsite, however, was platted just south of the depot along either side of the M&NE rail line in late 1889 or early 1890, with the business district centering on the now-former M-137 and Riley Rd/10th Street.

As the lumber industry grew, the area became more deforested. However, it was predicted from the beginning that the area would become a popular summer resort, and so Buckley and Douglas set aside 186 acres of virgin pines between Duck and Green lakes for preservation. The result was Pine Park, a public retreat boasting virgin forests and pristine lakes. A small railroad depot named Pine Park Station was built. Visitors began flocking to the region during the warmer months to camp, fish, boat, and escape the heat of the crowded cities. Piggybacking on the vacation boom, local businessman Willis Pennington purchased land adjacent to Pine Park on the banks of Green Lake and opened the Pennington Hotel in 1909.

In the mid-1910s, local representatives became worried that Pine Park would soon be logged off and so they lobbied the Michigan Legislature for help. The state ultimately allocated $60,000 in 1917 to purchase the property, and the newly acquired parkland was dedicated as The Pines, later renamed Interlochen State Park, the first state park organized by the state of Michigan (Mackinac Island was originally a national park before becoming Michigan's first state park in 1895).

In 1928, the National High School Orchestra Camp was founded by Joseph E. Maddy just south of Interlochen, and evolved to become Interlochen Center for the Arts, which includes a summer camp as well as an arts boarding high school and public radio station. The camp has expanded to both sides of J. Maddy Parkway (previously designated as a highway, M-137, in 1930 but decommissioned in 2020), and enveloped the entire village of Wylie.

By the late 20th century, the railroads that brought students, vacationers, and lumber through Interlochen, had been removed. The north-south M&NE railroad was removed in 1934, and the west-east C&WM railroad (Pere Marquette Railway after 1899) removed in 1982. The area remains a popular vacation spot, with hiking, fishing, camping, boating, swimming, cross country skiing, and snowmobiling the most popular activities.

The community of Interlochen was listed as a newly organized census-designated place for the 2010 census, meaning it now has officially defined boundaries and population statistics for the first time.

== Geography ==
According to the U.S. Census Bureau, the CDP has a total area of 1.27 square miles (3.29 km^{2}), of which 1.24 square miles (3.21 km^{2}) is land and 0.03 square miles (0.08 km^{2}) (2.36%) is water.

Interlochen is located within the Betsie River watershed.

== Public education ==
Interlochen is zoned within the Traverse City Area Public Schools district (TCAPS).

The nearest public high school is Traverse City West Senior High School. Prior to 2016, elementary school students were able to attend Interlochen Elementary School, part of TCAPS. With the closure of that school, the nearest public elementary schools are Blair Elementary School near Grawn, and Silver Lake Elementary School and Westwoods Elementary School near Traverse City.

== Media ==
Interlochen is home to 88.7 WIAA, which is run by the Interlochen Center for the Arts and operates as Northern Michigan's National Public Radio affiliate.

== Transportation ==
=== Major highways ===
- US 31 runs west–east through the northern portion of the community.
- M-137, known now as J. Maddy Parkway, is a former state highway that was commissioned from 1930 to 2020.

=== Public transportation ===
Interlochen is served by Traverse City's public transportation system, the Bay Area Transportation Authority (BATA) which serves most of the Grand Traverse region with dial-a-ride services. BATA also links riders to the Greyhound terminal for regional and long-distance travel.

Given the long dirt and gravel roads that cover much of Interlochen and its surrounding area, BATA began an experimental transit program in 2011 which consisted of rentable skateboards, scooters, bicycles and cross country skis (only available during the winter seasons). The program is largely targeted at the area's sizeable student population.

=== General aviation ===
- Green Lake Airport (Y88) is located three miles south of Interlochen.

== Demographics ==
Historical population
Census	Pop.	Note	%±
2010	583		—
2020	694		19.0%
U.S. Decennial Census

According to the census of 2010, there were 583 people, 240 households, and 142 families residing in the Interlochen CDP. The population density was 470.0 inhabitants per square mile (181.5/km^{2}). There were 277 housing units at an average density of 223.3 units per square mile (86.2 units/km^{2}).

As of the 2010 census, the racial makeup of Interlochen was 95.2% White, 2.2% Native American, 0.5% African-American or Black, 0.2% Native Hawaiian or Pacific Islander, 0.2% some other race, and 1.7% from two or more races. 1.9% of the population were Hispanic or Latino, who can be of any race.

In Interlochen, 25.4% of the population was under the age of 18, 8.9% was from 18 to 24, 33.3% from 25 to 44, 24.0% from 45 to 64, and 8.4% was 65 years of age or older. The median age was 32.3 years. For every 100 females, there were 104.6 males. For every 100 females age 18 and over, there were 98.6 males.
