= Green Lake (Grand Traverse County, Michigan) =

Lake in the state of Michigan, United States

- Lake Wahbekanetta
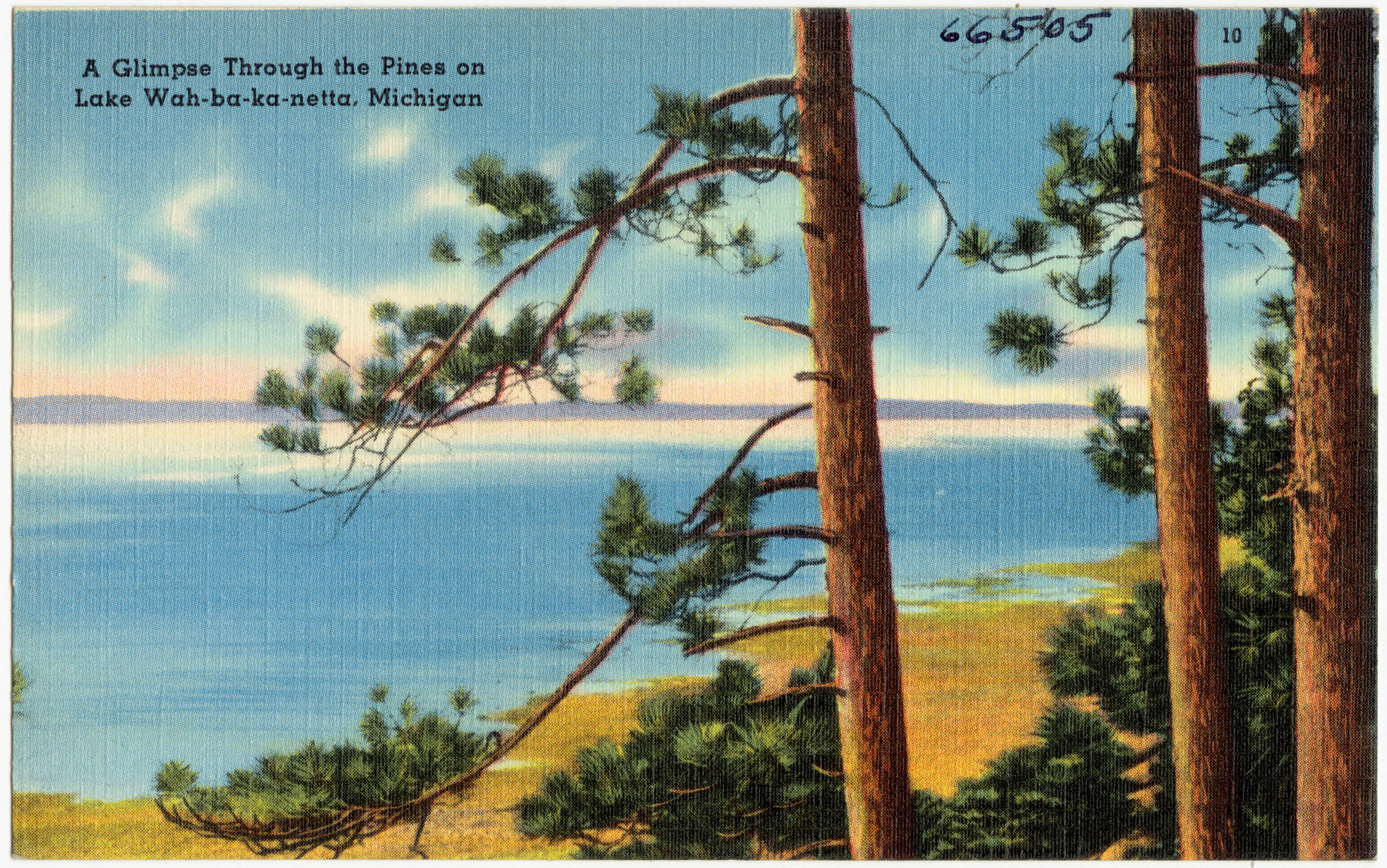
- "A Glimpse Through the Pines on Lake Wah-ba-ka-netta, Michigan"

- Location within Michigan
- Location: Green Lake and Grant townships, Grand Traverse County, Michigan
- Coordinates: 44°36′42.96″N 85°46′54.26″W
- Type: Lake
- Primary inflows: Duck Lake outflow
- Primary outflows: Betsie River
- Surface area: 2,000 acres (8 km^{2})
- Max. depth: 102 ft (31 m)
- Surface elevation: 824 ft (251 m)
- Islands: none
- Settlements: Interlochen

Green Lake (also known as Lake Wahbekanetta) is a large lake in the Lower Peninsula of the U.S. state of Michigan. Located within Grand Traverse County, Green Lake is one of two lakes the forms the isthmus of Interlochen, the other being Duck Lake. Green Lake is the primary source of the Betsie River, which flows west into Benzie County to Lake Michigan.

Green Lake is primarily within the eponymous Green Lake Township, although a small portion extends south into Grant Township. Green Lake is about 10 miles (16 km) southwest of Traverse City.

Between Green Lake and Duck Lake are Interlochen State Park and Interlochen Center for the Arts, a prestigious boarding school.

== See also ==
- List of lakes in Michigan
