= Grand Traverse County, Michigan =

County in Michigan, United States

- County
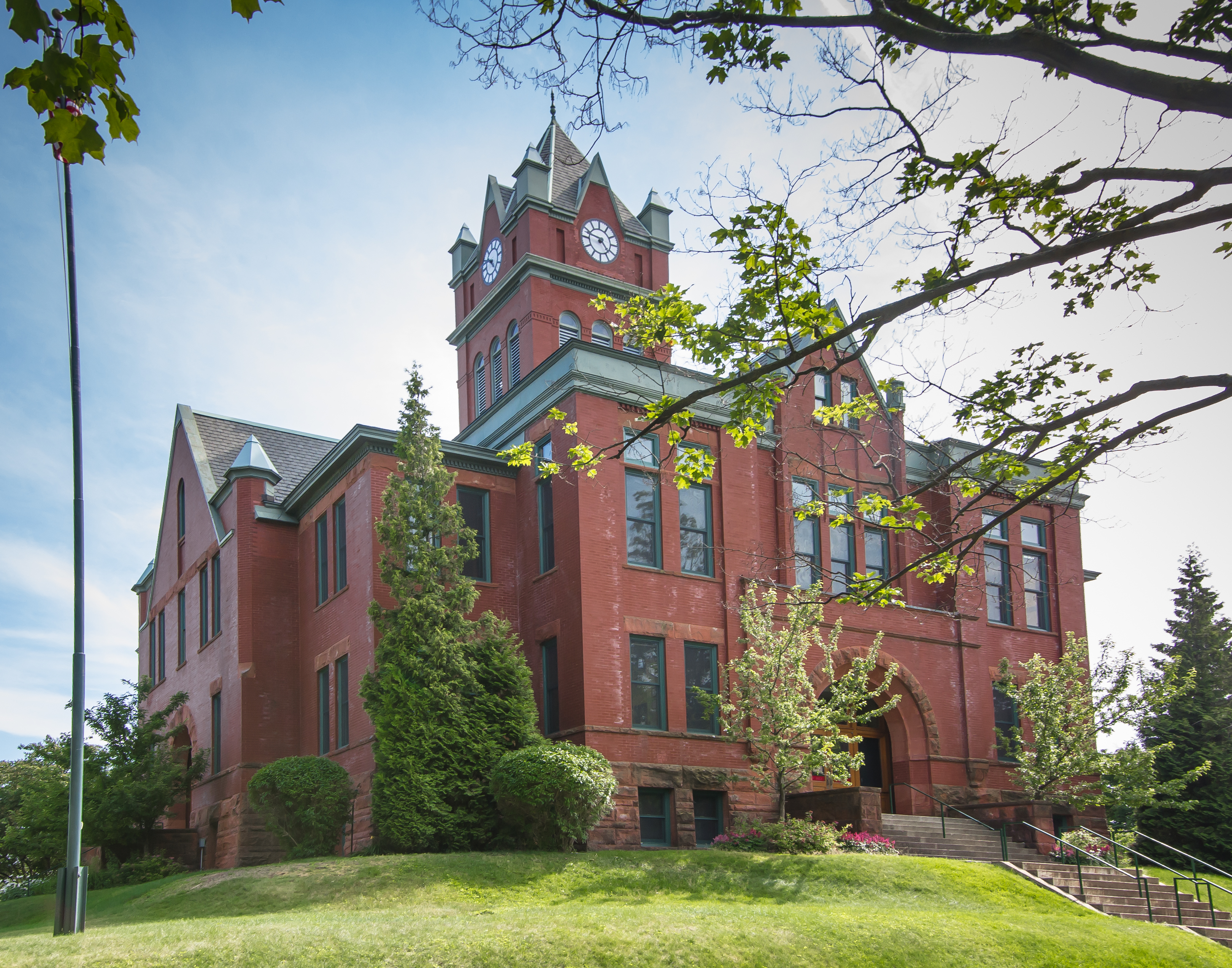
- Grand Traverse County Courthouse in Traverse City

- Location within the U.S. state of Michigan
- Coordinates: 44°44′N 85°33′W
- Country: United States
- State: Michigan
- Founded: 1840
- Organized: 1851
- Named for: Grand Traverse Bay
- Seat: Traverse City
- Largest city: Traverse City

Government
  - Administrator: Nate Alger

Area
  - Total: 601 sq mi (1,560 km^{2})
  - Land: 464 sq mi (1,200 km^{2})
  - Water: 137 sq mi (350 km^{2}) 23%

Population (2020)
  - Total: 95,238
  - Estimate (2025): 96,729 ▲
  - Density: 205/sq mi (79/km^{2})
- Time zone: UTC−5 (Eastern)
  - Summer (DST): UTC−4 (EDT)
- Congressional district: 1st
- Website: www.gtcountymi.gov

Grand Traverse County (/ˈtrævərs/ TRAV-ərss) is a county located in the U.S. state of Michigan. As of the 2020 census, the population was 95,238, making it the most populous county in Northern Michigan. Its county seat is Traverse City. The county is part of the Traverse City metropolitan area, which also includes neighboring Benzie, Kalkaska, and Leelanau counties.

Historically part of the territory under the Council of Three Fires (comprising the Ojibwe, Odawa, and Potawatomi), Grand Traverse County's first European settlement was established in 1839. It was originally created in 1840 as Omeena County; however, it was reorganized in 1851 as Grand Traverse County. The county itself and Traverse City are named after Grand Traverse Bay, a bay of Lake Michigan.

Interlochen Center for the Arts, a prestigious boarding school, is located within the county.

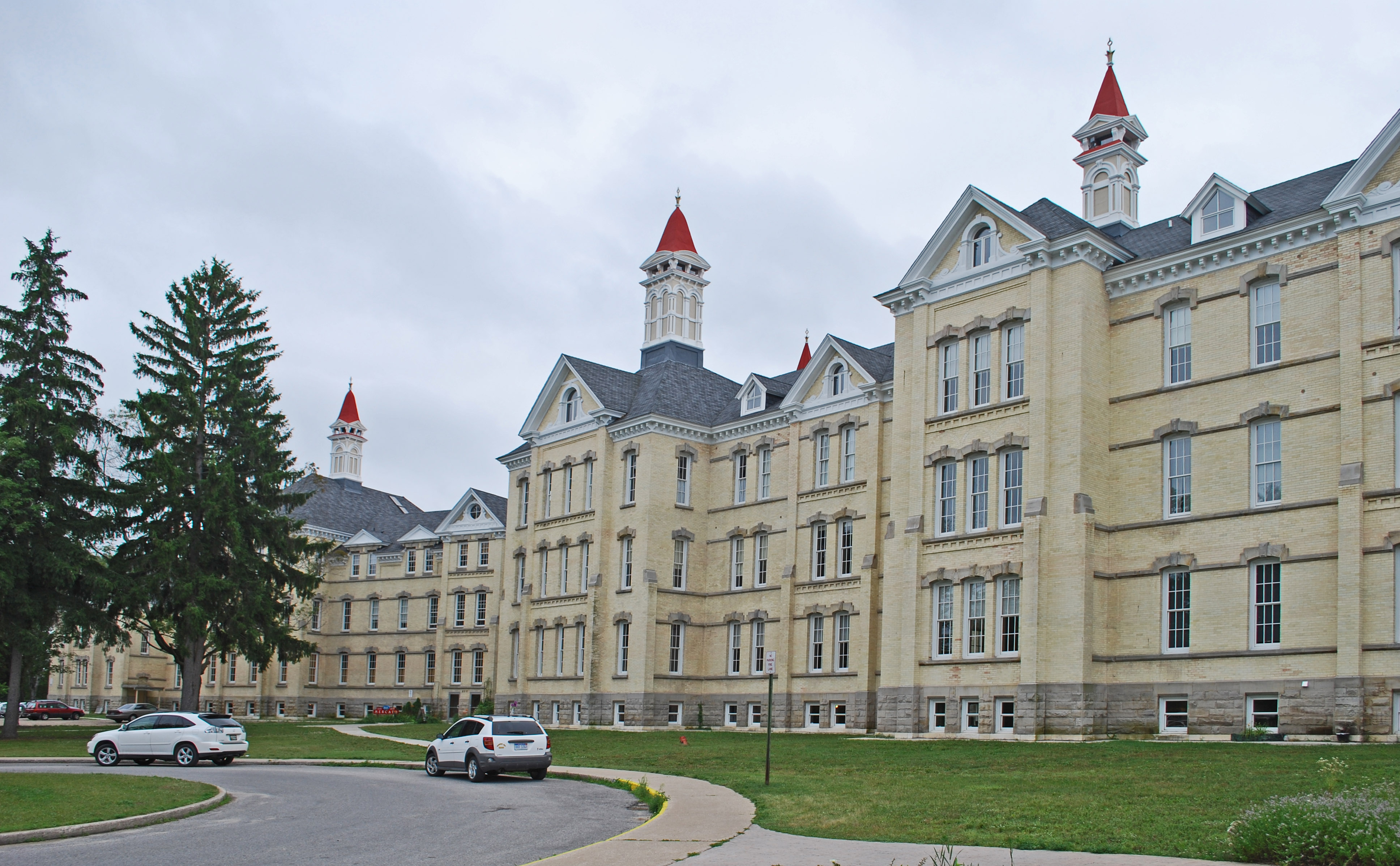
Traverse City State Hospital in Traverse City

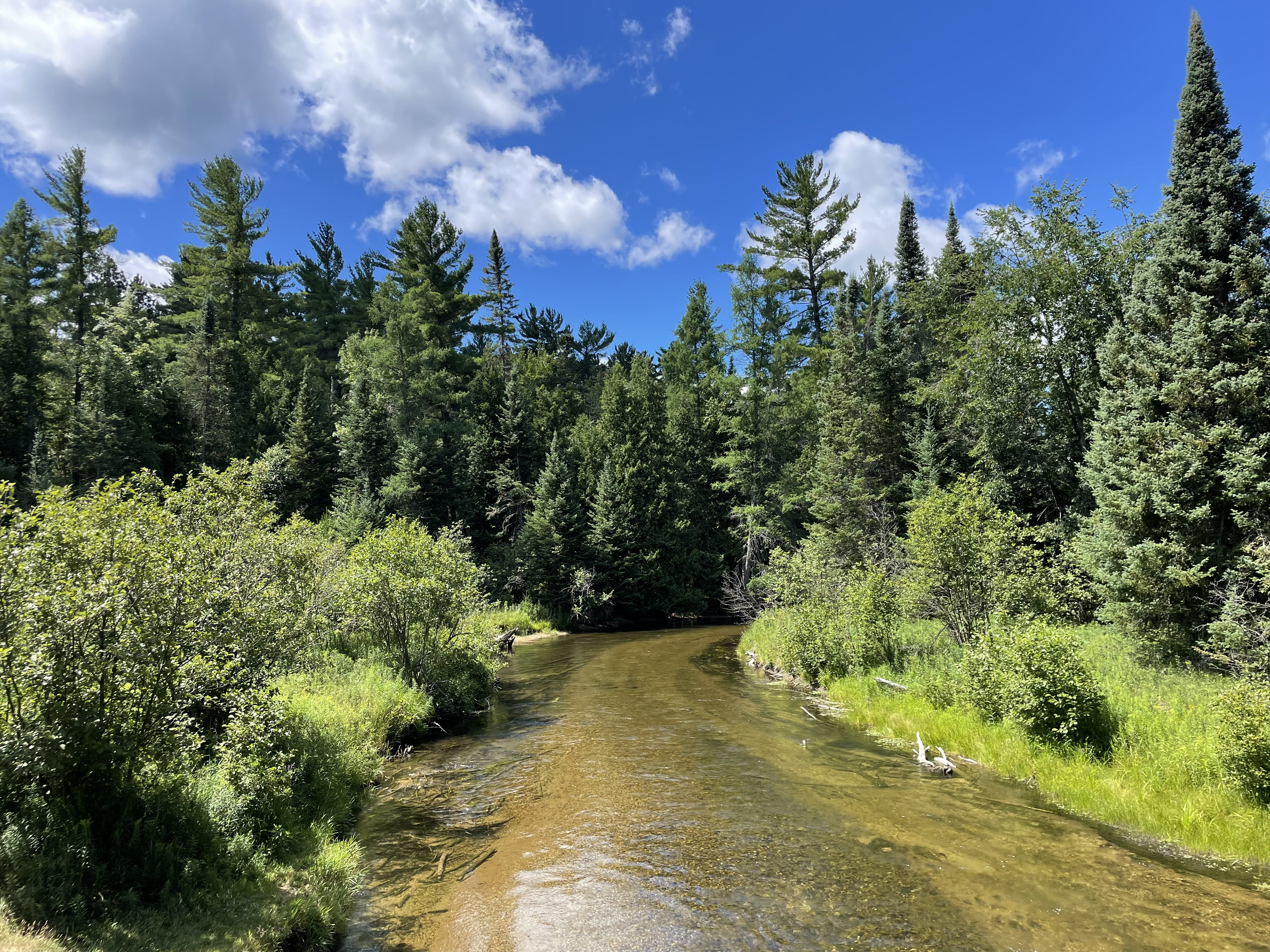
The Boardman River in southern East Bay Township

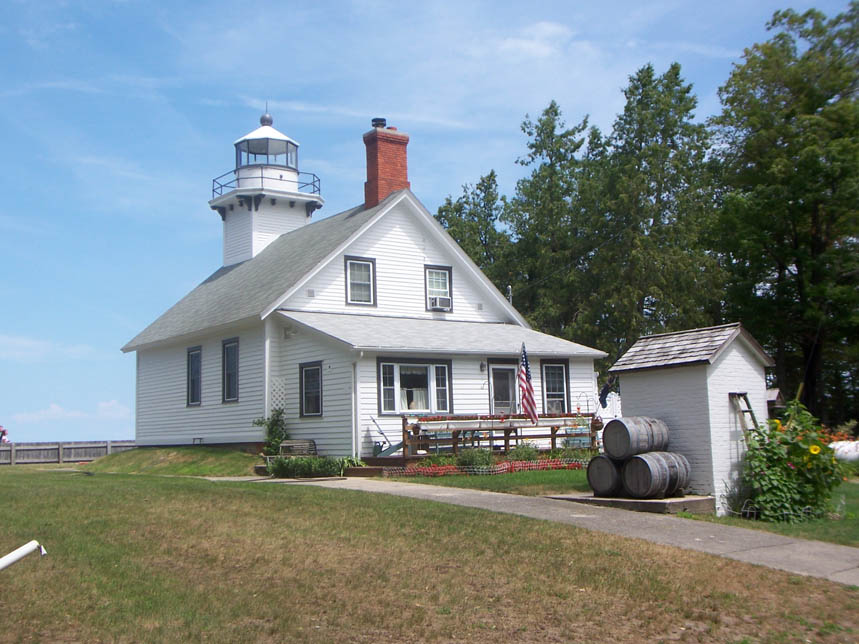
Mission Point Light, at the northern tip of the Old Mission Peninsula, lies just south of the 45th parallel.

== History ==
Prior to European settlement, Grand Traverse County was part of lands roamed by the Anishinaabe Council of Three Fires (comprising the Ojibwe, Odawa, and Potawatomi) tribes. The Anishinaabe call the area at the head of Grand Traverse Bay kitchiwikwedongsing (Ojibwe: 'place at the head of the great bay').

As a duty of the federal government under the 1836 Treaty of Washington, the first permanent settlement in the county was the mission now known as Old Mission, established in May 1839 as "Grand Traverse". "Grand Traverse Bay" comes from la grande traversée, or "the long crossing", named by the 18th-century French voyageurs who crossed the mouth of bay.

The Michigan Legislature separated the unorganized Omeena County from part of Michilimackinac County in 1840. Omeena is derived from an Ojibwe expression, o-me-nah, meaning "is it so?"

On April 7, 1851, an act of legislature organized Omeena County, effectively renaming it Grand Traverse County. The seat of government was designated to Boardman's Mills, a location in the young Traverse City. The future counties of Antrim, Benzie, Kalkaska, Leelanau, Manistee, Missaukee, and Wexford were subsequently attached to Grand Traverse County for administrative purposes, until being organized in their own rights. However, the act contained no provisions on formation of townships or choosing of election officials, thus Grand Traverse County had no legal government until 1858. That winter, an act of the state legislature completed the organization of Grand Traverse County and divided the county between two initial townships:

- Peninsula Township, comprising the Old Mission Peninsula, and
- Traverse Township, which encompassed the rest of the county.

Today, Grand Traverse County contains thirteen townships.

An 1884 article called the Traverse Region famous for "its productiveness of soil, salubrious climate and romantic scenery".

=== Historical markers ===
There are 12 recognized Michigan historical markers in the county: They are:

- City Opera House
- Congregation Beth El
- Dougherty Mission House
- Fife Lake–Union District No. 1 Schoolhouse
- Friends Meetinghouse
- Grand Traverse Bay
- Hannah and Lay Mercantile Building
- Hesler Log House
- Interlochen
- Ladies Library Association
- Novotny's Saloon
- Traverse City Regional Psychiatric Hospital

== Geography ==
According to the U.S. Census Bureau, the county has a total area of 601 square miles (1,560 km^{2}), of which 464 square miles (1,200 km^{2}) is land and 137 square miles (350 km^{2}) (23%) is water. Grand Traverse County is considered part of Northern Michigan. The highest point in Grand Traverse County is Exodus Hill in Long Lake Township, and the lowest point is the Grand Traverse Bay. The county is home to many notable lakes, including Arbutus Lake, Fife Lake, Green Lake, Silver Lake, Spider Lake, and part of Elk Lake. The county's largest inland lake is Long Lake.

The Old Mission Peninsula, which projects 17 miles (27 km) into Grand Traverse Bay, is politically part of Grand Traverse County, and is largely part of Peninsula Township. Power Island, an island in Grand Traverse Bay, is also part of Peninsula Township.

=== Rivers ===
- Betsie River, begins at Green Lake (although its tributaries extend much further into the county), flows west into Benzie County, and eventually to Lake Michigan at Frankfort.
- Boardman River, enters from the east from Kalkaska County, flows west and north until reaching West Bay in Traverse City.
- Platte River, begins at Long Lake and flows west to Lake Dubonnet and into Benzie County, eventually ending at Lake Michigan.

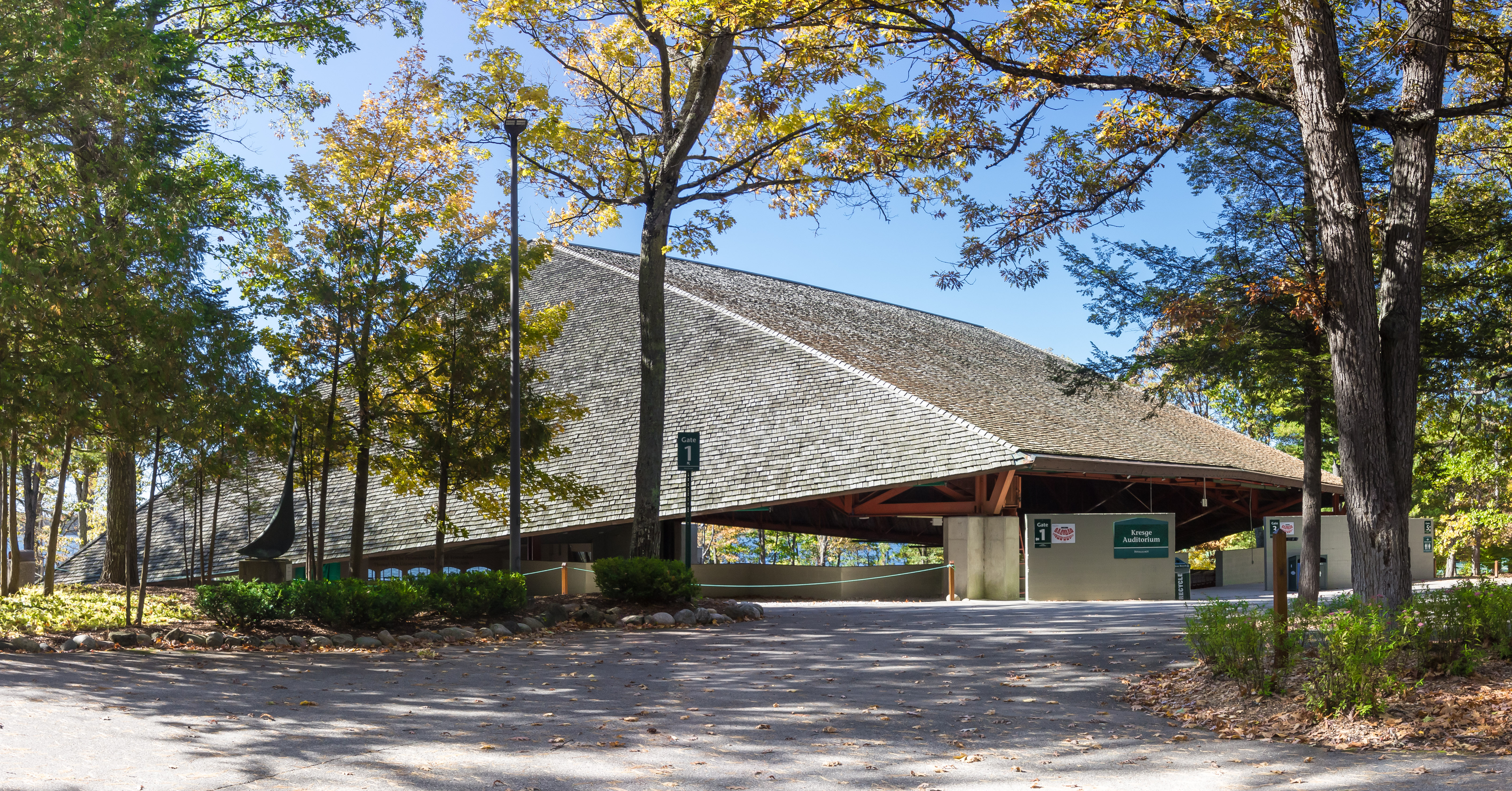
Kresge Auditorium, at the campus of Interlochen Center for the Arts

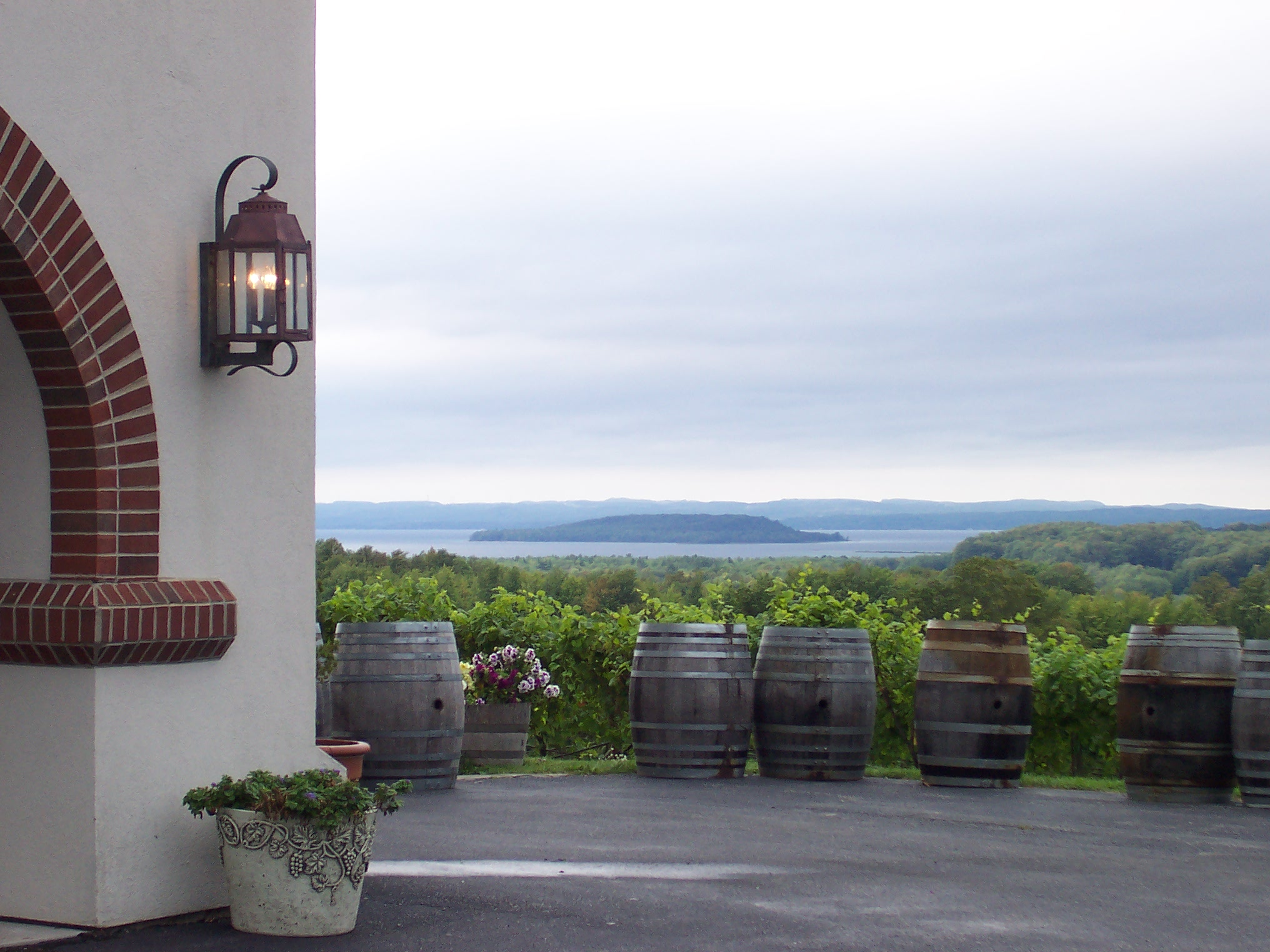
Power Island, in Grand Traverse Bay, from Chateau Chantal in Peninsula Township

=== Adjacent counties ===
- Antrim County (northeast)
- Kalkaska County (east)
- Missaukee County (southeast)
- Wexford County (south)
- Manistee County (southwest)
- Benzie County (west)
- Leelanau County (northwest)

=== Protected area ===
- Pere Marquette State Forest

=== State parks ===
- Interlochen State Park
- Keith J. Charters Traverse City State Park
- Old Mission State Park

== Communities ==
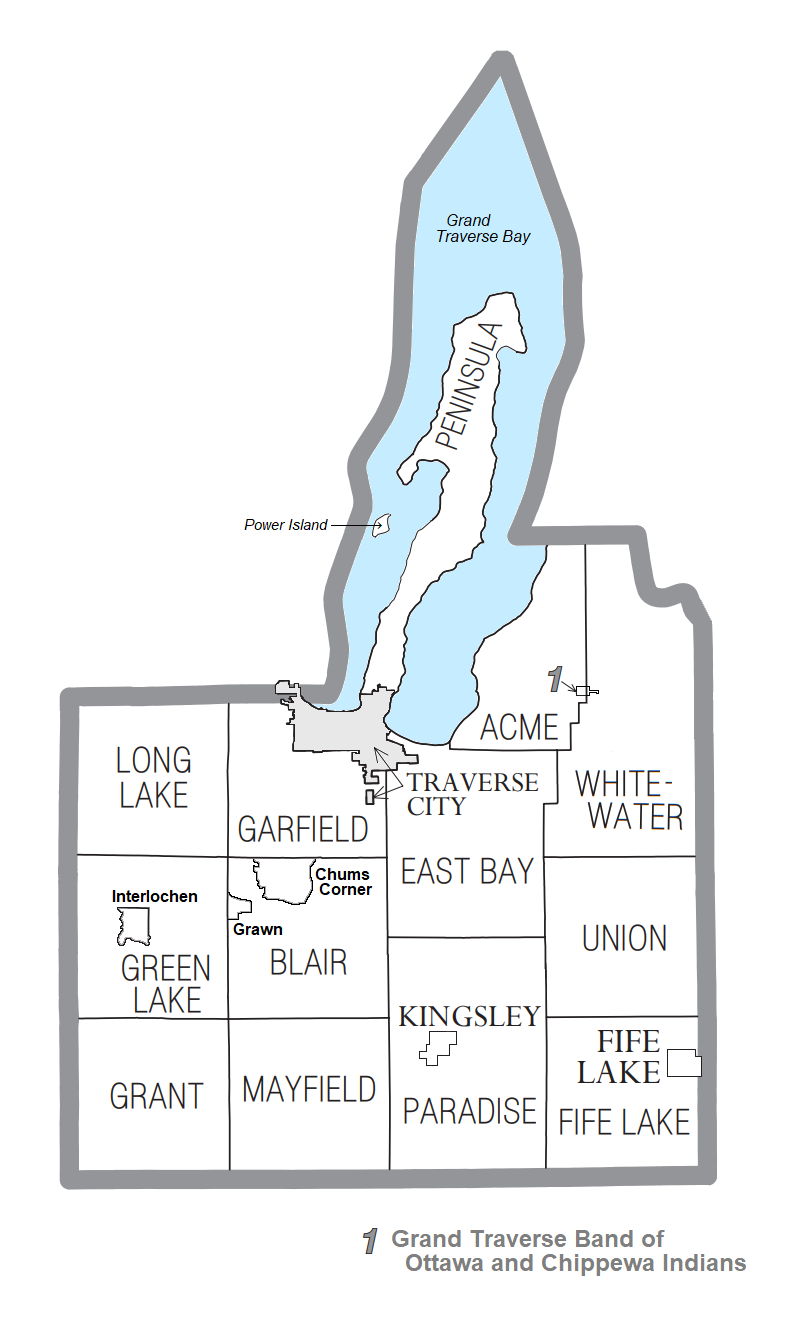
U.S. census data map showing local municipal boundaries within Grand Traverse County, as well as CDP boundaries. Shaded areas represent incorporated cities.

=== City ===
- Traverse City (county seat, partially in Leelanau County)

=== Villages ===
- Fife Lake
- Kingsley

=== Charter townships ===
- East Bay Township
- Garfield Township
- Long Lake Township

=== Civil townships ===
- Acme Township
- Blair Township
- Fife Lake Township
- Grant Township
- Green Lake Township
- Mayfield Township
- Paradise Township
- Peninsula Township
- Union Township
- Whitewater Township

=== Census-designated places ===
- Chums Corner
- Grawn
- Interlochen

=== Other unincorporated communities ===
- Acme
- Brookside
- Devils Elbow
- Fivemile Corner
- Hannah
- Hilltop
- Jacks Landing
- Karlin
- Long Lake
- Mapleton
- Mayfield
- Monroe Center
- Neahtawanta
- Old Mission
- Summit City
- Walton
- Wexford Corner
- Williamsburg
- Yuba

=== Ghost towns ===
- Angell
- Archie
- Bates
- Bartlett
- Beitner
- Cedar Run
- Diamond Park
- Duck Lake Park
- East Bay
- Hilltop
- Hodge
- Keystone
- Kratochvil's Plat
- Lakeside Resort
- Mabel
- McManus Corner
- Moffatt
- Munro
- Neal
- Ogdensburg
- Pavlovic Corner
- Peninsula Resort
- Slights
- Skegemog Point
- Traverse Point
- Westminster
- Wylie

=== Indian reservation ===
- Grand Traverse Band of Ottawa and Chippewa Indians

== Demographics ==
Historical population
Census	Pop.	Note	%±
1860	1,286		—
1870	4,443		245.5%
1880	8,422		89.6%
1890	13,355		58.6%
1900	20,479		53.3%
1910	23,784		16.1%
1920	19,518		−17.9%
1930	20,011		2.5%
1940	23,390		16.9%
1950	28,598		22.3%
1960	33,490		17.1%
1970	39,175		17.0%
1980	54,899		40.1%
1990	64,273		17.1%
2000	77,654		20.8%
2010	86,986		12.0%
2020	95,238		9.5%
2025 (est.)	96,729	▲	1.6%
U.S. Decennial Census; 1790-1960 1900-1990; 1990-2000 2010-2018

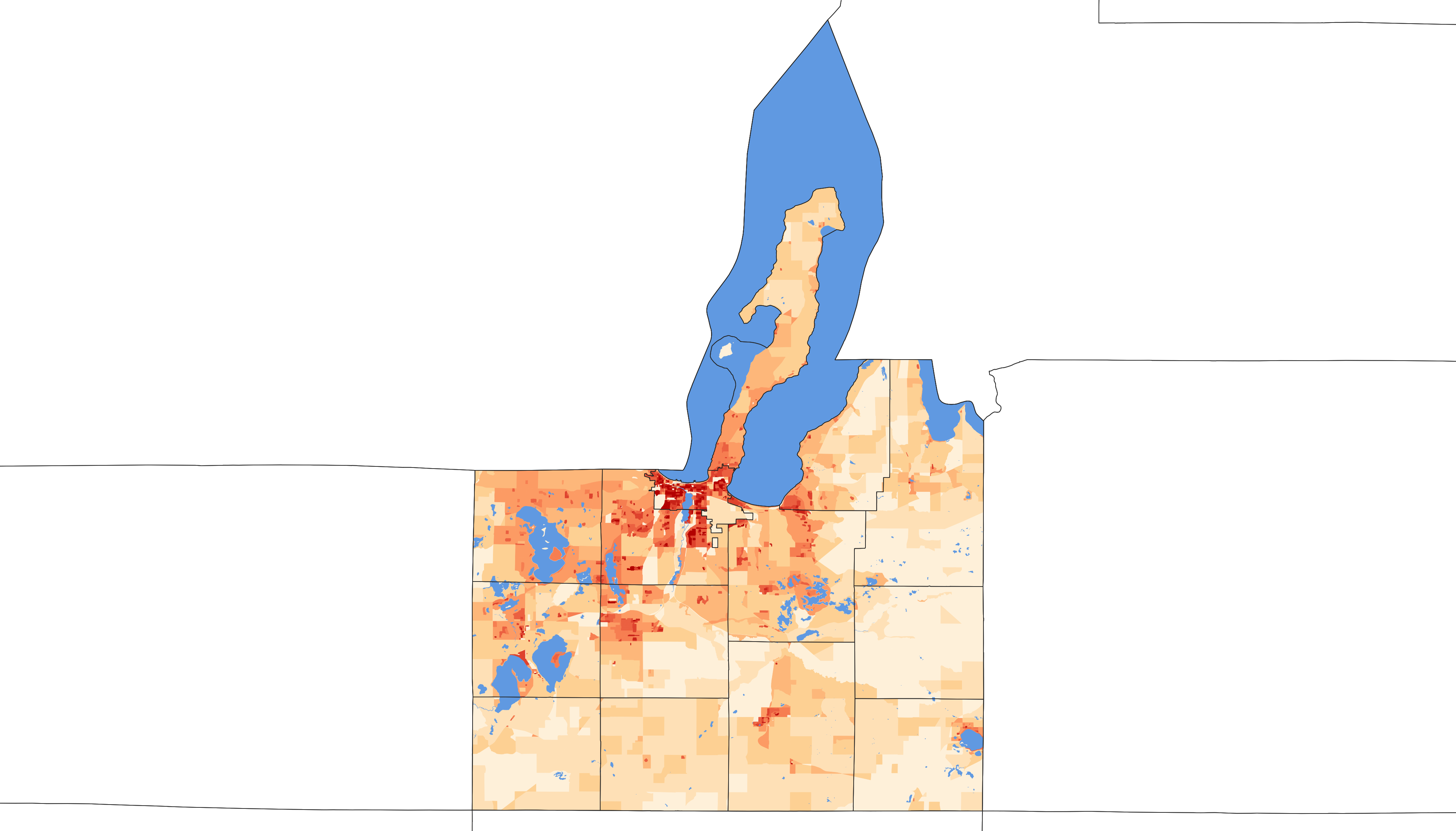
2020 population density of Grand Traverse County MI by census block

=== Racial and ethnic composition ===
Grand Traverse County, Michigan – Racial and ethnic composition Note: the US Census treats Hispanic/Latino as an ethnic category. This table excludes Latinos from the racial categories and assigns them to a separate category. Hispanics/Latinos may be of any race.
Race / Ethnicity (NH = Non-Hispanic)	Pop 1980	Pop 1990	Pop 2000	Pop 2010	Pop 2020	% 1980	% 1990	% 2000	% 2010	% 2020
White alone (NH)	53,845	62,654	74,258	81,188	85,543	98.08%	97.48%	95.63%	93.33%	89.82%
Black or African American alone (NH)	163	251	295	1,023	583	0.30%	0.39%	0.38%	1.18%	0.61%
Native American or Alaska Native alone (NH)	394	537	699	941	878	0.72%	0.84%	0.90%	1.08%	0.92%
Asian alone (NH)	142	309	382	588	813	0.26%	0.48%	0.49%	0.68%	0.85%
Native Hawaiian or Pacific Islander alone (NH)	x	x	18	25	41	x	x	0.02%	0.03%	0.04%
Other race alone (NH)	58	19	57	40	289	0.11%	0.03%	0.07%	0.05%	0.30%
Mixed race or Multiracial (NH)	x	x	790	1,307	4,081	x	x	1.02%	1.50%	4.29%
Hispanic or Latino (any race)	297	503	1,155	1,874	3,010	0.54%	0.78%	1.49%	2.15%	3.16%
Total	54,899	64,273	77,654	86,986	95,238	100.00%	100.00%	100.00%	100.00%	100.00%

=== 2020 census ===
As of the 2020 census, the county had a population of 95,238. The median age was 43.4 years. 19.8% of residents were under the age of 18 and 21.4% of residents were 65 years of age or older. For every 100 females there were 96.8 males, and for every 100 females age 18 and over there were 94.4 males age 18 and over.

The racial makeup of the county was 90.8% White, 0.6% Black or African American, 1.0% American Indian and Alaska Native, 0.9% Asian, 0.1% Native Hawaiian and Pacific Islander, 1.1% from some other race, and 5.5% from two or more races. Hispanic or Latino residents of any race comprised 3.2% of the population.

56.8% of residents lived in urban areas, while 43.2% lived in rural areas.

There were 39,819 households in the county, of which 25.6% had children under the age of 18 living in them. Of all households, 49.5% were married-couple households, 17.2% were households with a male householder and no spouse or partner present, and 25.8% were households with a female householder and no spouse or partner present. About 29.2% of all households were made up of individuals and 13.6% had someone living alone who was 65 years of age or older.

There were 45,776 housing units, of which 13.0% were vacant. Among occupied housing units, 75.0% were owner-occupied and 25.0% were renter-occupied. The homeowner vacancy rate was 1.0% and the rental vacancy rate was 8.0%.

=== 2000 census ===
As of the 2000 census, there were 77,654 people, 30,396 households, and 20,730 families residing in the county. The population density was 167 inhabitants per square mile (64/km^{2}). There were 34,842 housing units at an average density of 75 per square mile (29/km^{2}).

In 2000, the racial makeup of the county was 96.51% White, 0.40% Black or African American, 0.93% Native American, 0.49% Asian, 0.03% Pacific Islander, 0.54% from other races, and 1.09% from two or more races. 1.49% of the population were Hispanic or Latino of any race. 25.1% were of German, 11.3% English, 10.7% Irish, 8.4% American and 7.4% Polish ancestry, 96.4% spoke only English at home, while 1.6% spoke Spanish at home.

There were 30,396 households, out of which 32.80% had children under the age of 18 living with them, 55.70% were married couples living together, 9.20% had a female householder with no husband present, and 31.80% were non-families. 25.00% of all households were made up of individuals, and 9.00% had someone living alone who was 65 years of age or older. The average household size was 2.49 and the average family size was 2.99.

In the county, 25.4% of the population was under the age of 18, 7.9% was from 18 to 24, 29.7% from 25 to 44, 24.0% from 45 to 64, and 13.1% was 65 years of age or older. The median age was 38 years. For every 100 females, there were 95.20 males. For every 100 females age 18 and over, there were 92.10 males.

In 2000, the median income for a household in the county was $43,169, and the median income for a family was $51,211. Males had a median income of $34,796 versus $24,139 for females. The per capita income for the county was $22,111. About 3.80% of families and 5.90% of the population were below the poverty line, including 5.30% of those under age 18 and 5.90% of those age 65 or over.

=== Religion ===
Grand Traverse County is located within the Roman Catholic Diocese of Gaylord. It is also located in the Episcopal Diocese of Western Michigan.

== Politics ==
Historically, Grand Traverse County has been a Republican-leaning county, like most of northern Michigan. It has voted for the Republican candidate in every presidential election since the Civil War, except for four: 1912, 1932, 1936, and 1964. In 1912, it supported Bull Moose candidate Theodore Roosevelt as the GOP was mortally divided. The only other times it has not supported a Republican saw 400-vote and 40-state national Democratic landslides.

Since 2008, the county has become more politically competitive than other counties in traditionally heavily Republican Northern Michigan, with Democrats managing at least 40 percent of the vote in the last five presidential elections after not having done so since carrying the county in 1964. This is due almost entirely to Traverse City, which leans Democratic. The suburban and rural areas, however, remain powerfully Republican. Proving this, a Democrat holds the state house seat centered around Traverse City, the only Democrat representing a district based in Northern Michigan.

In the 2022 Michigan gubernatorial election, Democrat Gretchen Whitmer received 27,396 votes (52.38%), making her the first Democratic gubernatorial candidate to carry the county since 1986.

United States presidential election results for Grand Traverse County, Michigan
Year	Republican		Democratic		Third party(ies)	
Year	No.	%	No.	%	No.	%
1884	1,645	64.59%	808	31.72%	94	3.69%
1888	1,859	63.10%	925	31.40%	162	5.50%
1892	1,734	54.70%	924	29.15%	512	16.15%
1896	2,533	57.20%	1,745	39.41%	150	3.39%
1900	3,127	68.38%	1,286	28.12%	160	3.50%
1904	3,383	81.40%	594	14.29%	179	4.31%
1908	2,811	65.88%	1,289	30.21%	167	3.91%
1912	899	23.25%	937	24.23%	2,031	52.52%
1916	1,917	45.81%	1,848	44.16%	420	10.04%
1920	4,056	74.04%	1,158	21.14%	264	4.82%
1924	4,011	74.86%	558	10.41%	789	14.73%
1928	4,429	74.56%	1,489	25.07%	22	0.37%
1932	3,442	45.70%	3,907	51.88%	182	2.42%
1936	3,676	46.07%	3,827	47.96%	477	5.98%
1940	5,620	64.27%	3,095	35.39%	30	0.34%
1944	5,413	67.03%	2,607	32.28%	55	0.68%
1948	5,473	68.28%	2,365	29.51%	177	2.21%
1952	9,034	77.14%	2,639	22.53%	38	0.32%
1956	9,102	73.47%	3,256	26.28%	30	0.24%
1960	8,618	63.65%	4,886	36.09%	36	0.27%
1964	6,198	45.26%	7,475	54.59%	20	0.15%
1968	8,960	61.51%	4,741	32.55%	866	5.94%
1972	11,421	64.81%	5,810	32.97%	390	2.21%
1976	13,505	63.85%	7,263	34.34%	382	1.81%
1980	14,484	58.63%	7,150	28.94%	3,072	12.43%
1984	18,036	70.83%	7,271	28.55%	157	0.62%
1988	17,191	62.46%	10,098	36.69%	236	0.86%
1992	13,629	39.55%	11,148	32.35%	9,684	28.10%
1996	16,355	49.07%	12,987	38.97%	3,987	11.96%
2000	22,358	58.48%	14,371	37.59%	1,500	3.92%
2004	27,446	59.42%	18,256	39.52%	489	1.06%
2008	24,716	50.60%	23,258	47.62%	869	1.78%
2012	26,534	55.05%	20,875	43.31%	788	1.63%
2016	27,413	52.73%	20,965	40.33%	3,607	6.94%
2020	30,502	50.54%	28,683	47.53%	1,168	1.94%
2024	31,423	50.06%	30,339	48.33%	1,010	1.61%

United States Senate election results for Grand Traverse County, Michigan1
Year	Republican		Democratic		Third party(ies)	
Year	No.	%	No.	%	No.	%
2024	30,865	49.76%	29,487	47.54%	1,670	2.69%

Michigan Gubernatorial election results for Grand Traverse County
Year	Republican		Democratic		Third party(ies)	
Year	No.	%	No.	%	No.	%
2022	24,005	45.90%	27,396	52.38%	901	1.72%

In the 2020 presidential election, Donald Trump carried the county, despite losing the state of Michigan. In 2020, he won the county with 50.54% (30,502 votes), and in 2016, won with 52.73% (27,413 votes). Despite Trump's relatively similar percentage, his margin was massively decreased due to the lack of third party options in 2020 as well as a higher turnout for Democrats. In the 2024 election, despite being carried by Trump, Grand Traverse County was one of two counties in Michigan where Trump's percentage of votes decreased, along with neighboring Leelanau County.

In 2008, Republican candidate John McCain received 24,716 votes in the county (50.60% of the total) to Democratic candidate Barack Obama's 23,258 (47.62%), even as Obama carried the state of Michigan by a double-digit margin. McCain's margin of victory was narrower than usual for a Republican candidate in the county.

In 2004, Republican president George W. Bush received 27,446 votes in the county (59.42%) to Democrat John Kerry's 18,256 (39.52%).

In 2000, Bush received 22,358 votes in the county (58.48%) to Democrat Al Gore's 14,371 (37.59%).

== Government ==
The county government operates the jail, maintains rural roads, operates the major local courts, keeps files of deeds and mortgages, maintains vital records, administers public health regulations, and participates with the state in the provision of welfare and other social services. The county board of commissioners controls the budget but has only limited authority to make laws or ordinances. In Michigan, most local government functions — police and fire, building and zoning, tax assessment, street maintenance, etc. — are the responsibility of individual cities and townships. The county administrator is Nate Alger.

Grand Traverse County is represented in the U.S. House of Representatives by Jack Bergman (R), and is part of Michigan's 1st congressional district.

In the Michigan House of Representatives, Grand Traverse County is divided between the 103rd and 104th districts. The 103rd, which comprises Traverse City and the townships of East Bay, Garfield, Long Lake, and Peninsula, is represented in Lansing by Betsy Coffia (D). The 104th, which comprises the rest of Grand Traverse County, is represented by John Roth (R). In the Michigan Senate, Grand Traverse County is part of the 37th Senate district, and is represented by John Damoose (R).

=== Elected officials ===
- Prosecuting Attorney: Noelle Moeggenberg
- Sheriff: Michael Shea
- County Clerk: Bonnie Scheele
- County Treasurer: Sarah Gum
- Register of Deeds: Peggy Haines
- Drain Commissioner: Andy Smits

==== County commission ====
Grand Traverse County Commissioners (since January 8, 2025)
Name	Party	District
Brian McAllister	Republican	1
Lauren Flynn	Democratic	2
Ashlea Walter	Democratic	3
Fern Spence	Democratic	4
Rob Hentschel	Republican	5
Darryl Nelson	Republican	6
T.J. Andrews (vice chair)	Democratic	7
Scott Sieffert (chair)	Republican	8
Penny Morris	Republican	9

=== Law enforcement agencies ===
==== County ====
- Grand Traverse County Sheriff's Office

==== City ====
- Traverse City Police Department

=== Fire departments ===
- Blair Township Fire Department
- Cherry Capital Airport Fire Department
- Fife Lake Springfield Fire Department
- Grand Traverse Metro Fire Department
- Green Lake Township Emergency Services
- Long Lake Fire-Rescue
- Paradise Emergency Services
- Peninsula Township Fire Department
- City of Traverse City Fire Department
- Whitewater Township Fire Department

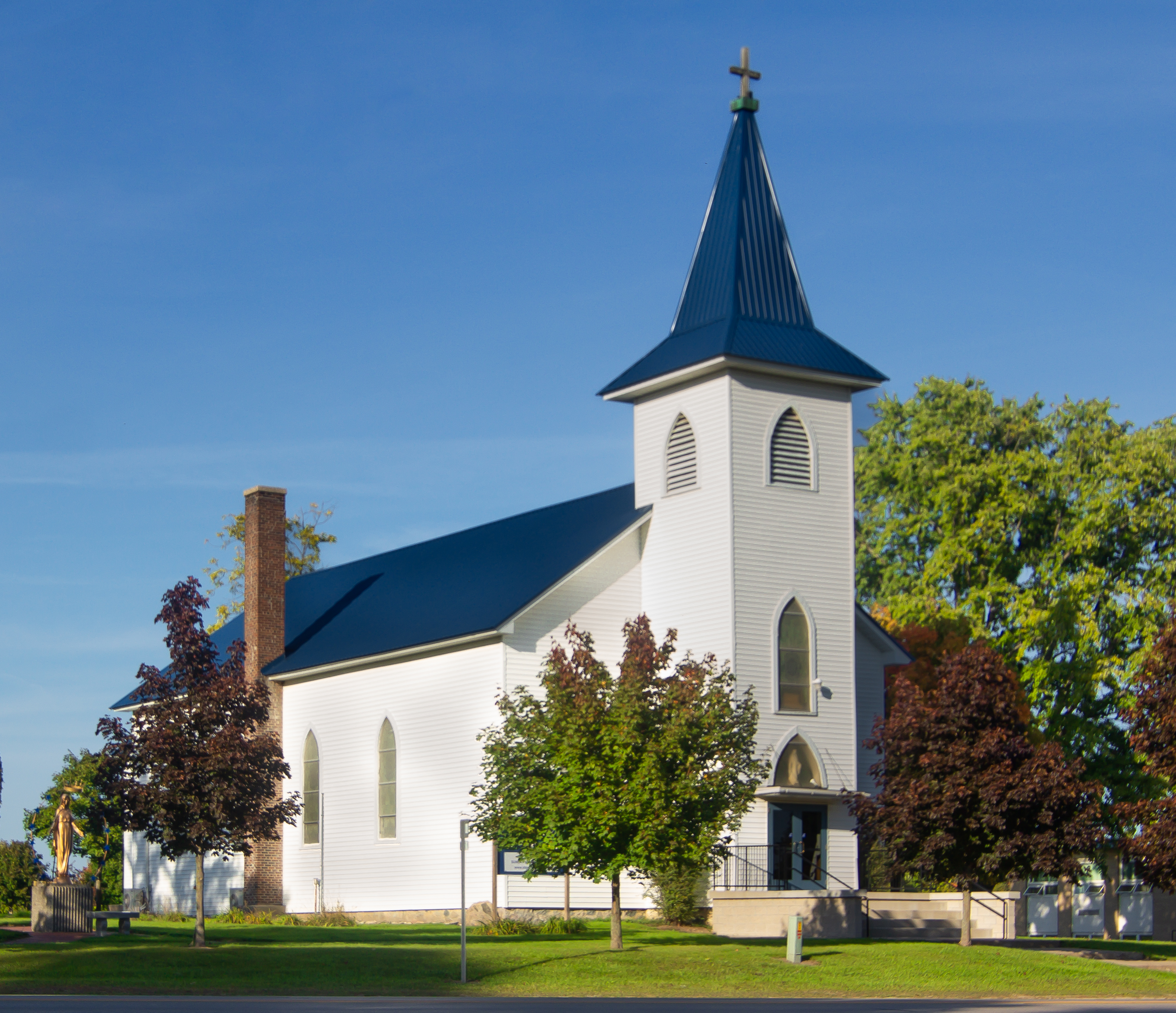
St. Mary's Catholic Church in the Mayfield Township community of Hannah.

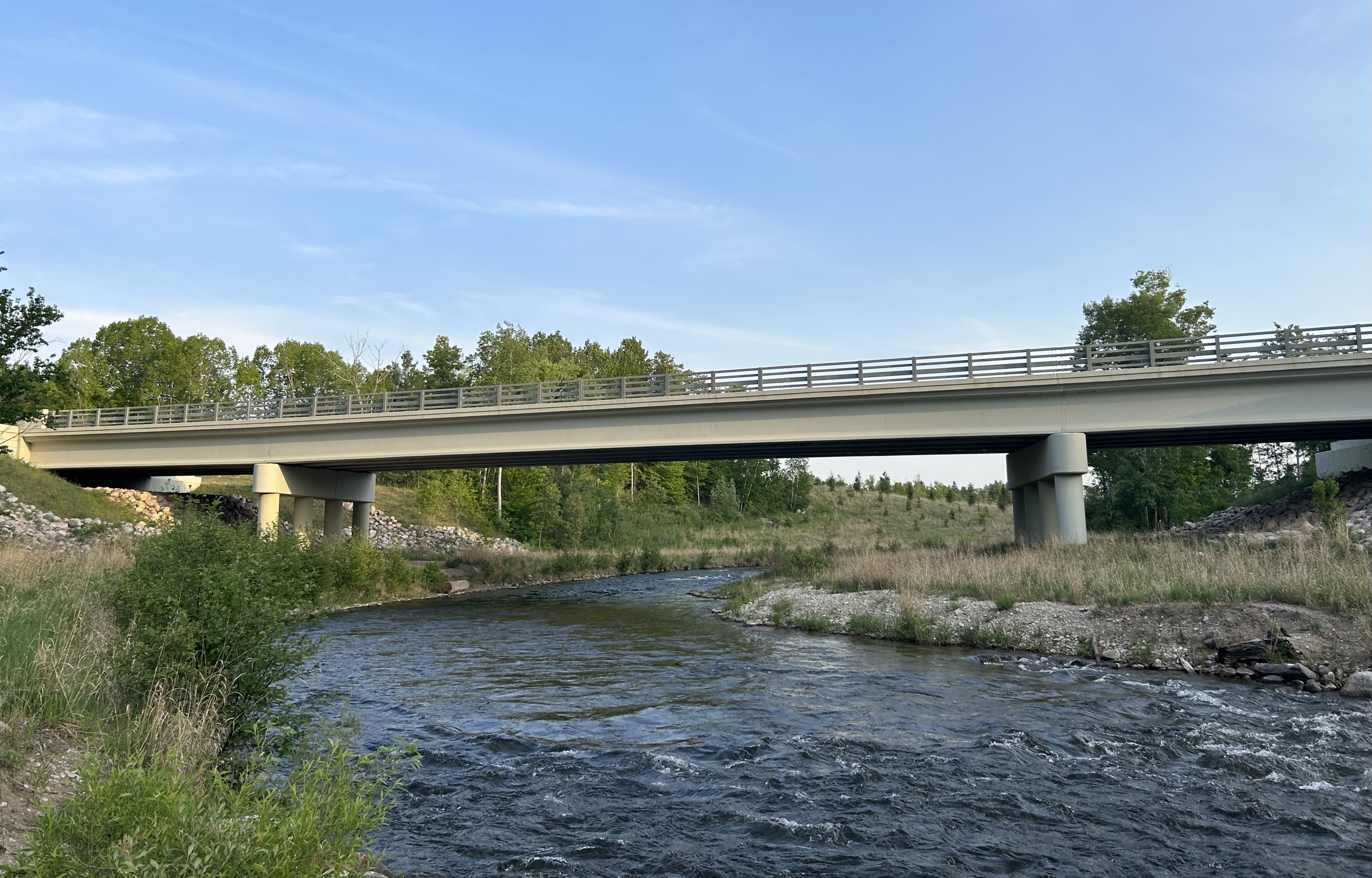
Robbins Bridge, which carries Cass Road over the Boardman River

== Education ==
=== Primary and secondary ===
Grand Traverse County is served by the following public school districts:

- Benzie Central Schools (BCS) serves the extreme southwestern corner of the county.
- Buckley Community School District (BCSD) serves the southwest of the county.
- Elk Rapids Schools (ERS) serves the northeasternmost areas of the county.
- Forest Area Community Schools (FACS) serves the southeast of the county, including the village of Fife Lake.
- Manton Consolidated Schools (MCS) serves a few square miles in the extreme southeastern corner of the county.
- Kingsley Area Schools (KAS) serves the south–center of the county, focused on the village of Kingsley.
- Traverse City Area Public Schools (TCAPS) serves most of the county, centered on Traverse City. The district contains two high schools, Traverse City Central and Traverse City West.

The county is also home to many smaller charter and private schools, most notably those that are a part of Grand Traverse Area Catholic Schools.

=== Post-secondary ===
Grand Traverse County is home to Northwestern Michigan College, a public community college in Traverse City.

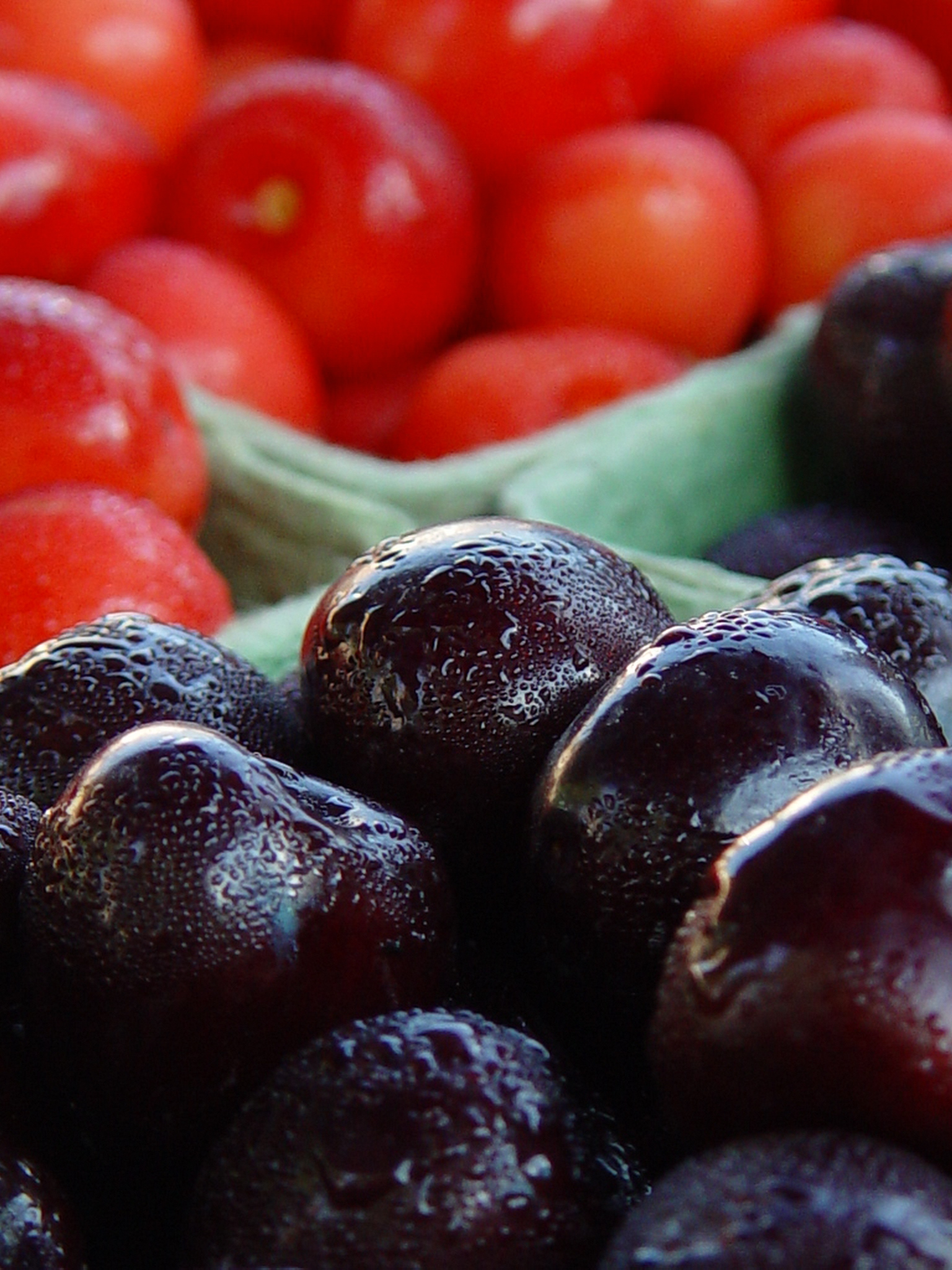
Cherries for sale at a Traverse City farmers' market. Grand Traverse County and other counties surrounding Grand Traverse Bay are world-renowned for their cherry production.

== Economy ==
According to the Grand Traverse Economic Development Corporation, the largest employers in Grand Traverse County, as of 2017, are:

#	Employer	Full-time employees
1	Munson Healthcare	3,100
2	Traverse City Area Public Schools	1,800
3	Northwestern Michigan College	750
4	Grand Traverse Resort and Spa	550
5	Hagerty Insurance Agency	500
6	Grand Traverse County	500
7	Interlochen Center for the Arts	475
8	Grand Traverse Pavilions	415
9	Britten Banners	380
10	Tyson Foods	300

== Transportation ==
=== Air service ===
Grand Traverse County is served commercially by Cherry Capital Airport, which is located near Traverse City. It serves the 21-county Northern Michigan area, and has year-round and seasonal destinations around the United States. In 2019, Cherry Capital Airport had the fourth-most enplanements of any airport in Michigan, behind Detroit Metropolitan Airport, Grand Rapids' Gerald R. Ford International Airport, and Flint's Bishop International Airport.

Other airparks in the county include:

- Acme Skyport
- Green Lake Airport
- Tramps Aerodrome
- Yuba Airport

Formerly, there was an airport on the south side of Traverse City called Ransom Field. This was located on Rennie Hill. This airport closed sometime in the 1930s.

=== Major highways ===
- US 31 follows a jagged path through the county, at various points traveling north–south and east–west. The route is one of Northern Michigan's busiest thoroughfares as it passes through Traverse City. It provides access to cities to the north (such as Charlevoix and Petoskey) and southwest (such as Ludington and Muskegon). The highway runs south to Spanish Fort, Alabama, through major cities like Indianapolis, Louisville, Nashville, and Birmingham.
- US 131 runs northeast–southwest through the far southeast of the county, entirely within Fife Lake Township. The highway provides access to Kalkaska and Petoskey to the north, and cities such as Cadillac, Grand Rapids, and Kalamazoo to the south. The southern end is at the Indiana Toll Road just across the state line.
- M-22 begins at an intersection in Traverse City, and runs northwest along the Grand Traverse Bay. It then continues in Leelanau County, following the shore of Grand Traverse Bay towards Suttons Bay and Northport, then turning southwesterly towards Leland, Glen Arbor, Frankfort, and Manistee.
- M-37 is the longest highway in the county. A north–south route, the highway enters the county from near Buckley and continues north to the Old Mission Peninsula via Traverse City. The highway terminates at a cul-de-sac near Mission Point Light. South of Grand Traverse County, the route continues south through the state to Baldwin, Grand Rapids, Hastings, and Battle Creek.
- M-72 is an east–west route, entering the county from the northwest. The route passes through Traverse City, and continues east toward Kalkaska, passing through Williamsburg along the way. The highway provides access to Empire and central Leelanau County to the west, and Grayling and Harrisville on the Lake Huron shore to the east.
- M-113 is an east–west route in the south of the county, connecting M-37 to US 131 while passing through Kingsley and Walton.
- M-186 is a short highway providing a direct route from M-113 to US 131 at Fife Lake.

Previously, an additional highway, M-137, ran through Grand Traverse County, from US 31 in Green Lake Township south to Interlochen, passing by Interlochen Center for the Arts and Interlochen State Park. However, MDOT decommissioned the highway in 2020.

=== Bicycle route ===
- USBR 35 parallels the shore of Grand Traverse Bay along a number of roadways and local trails, including those that are part of the TART Trails system.

== See also ==
- Cherry production in Michigan
- List of Michigan State Historic Sites in Grand Traverse County
- National Register of Historic Places listings in Grand Traverse County, Michigan
