= Green Lake Township, Michigan =

- Civil township
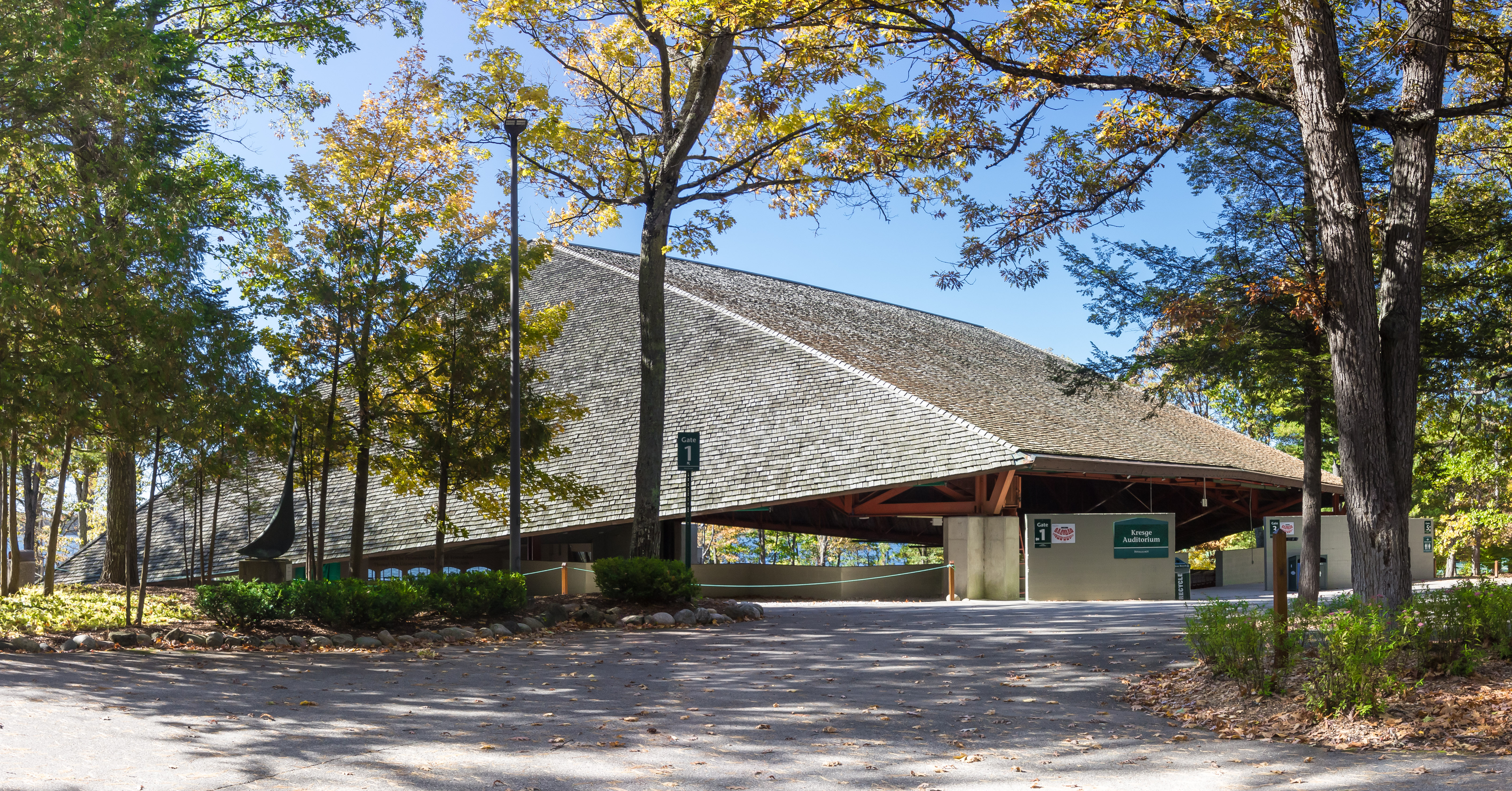
- Kresge Auditorium at Interlochen Center for the Arts

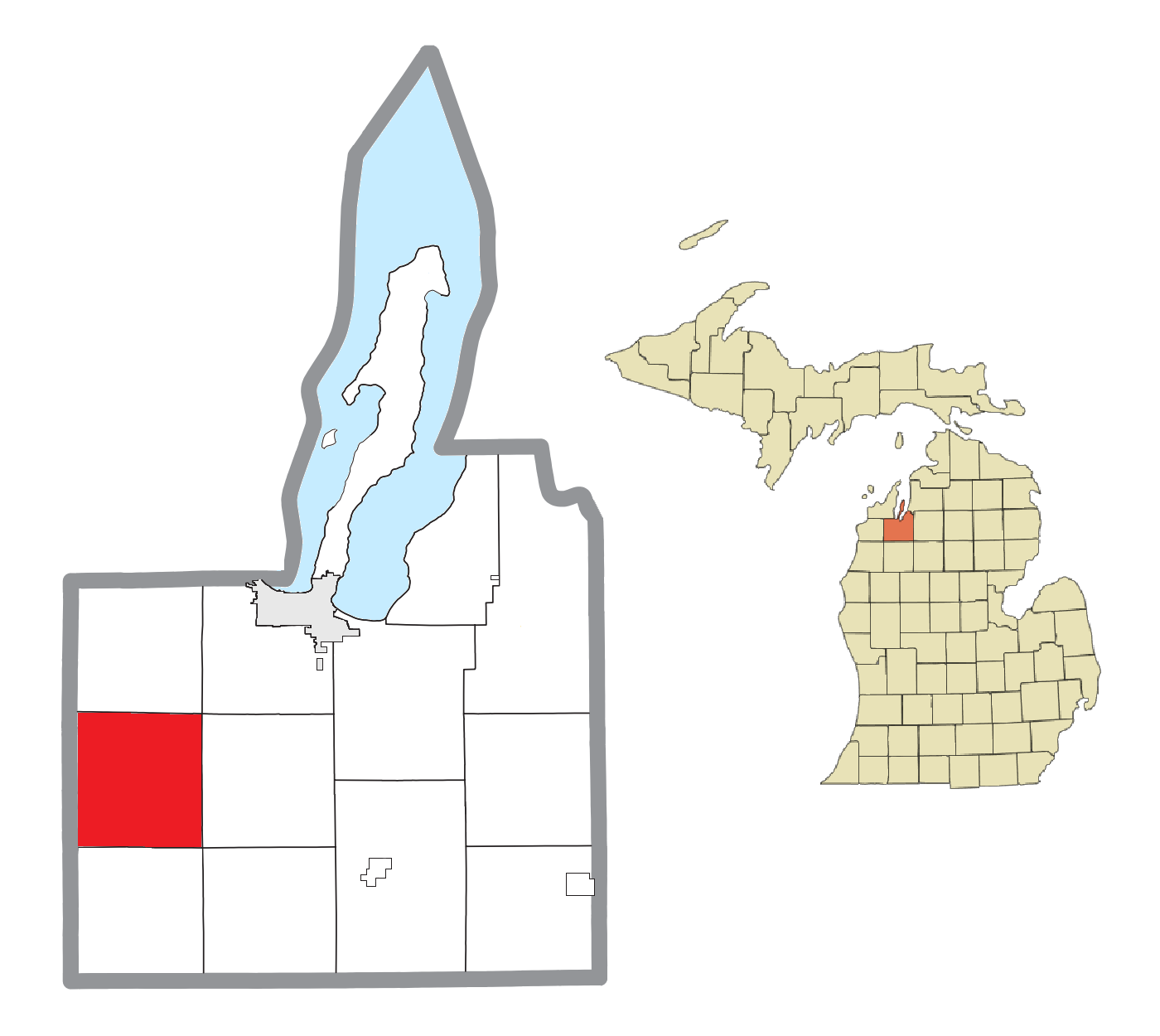
- Location within Grand Traverse County

- Location within the state of Michigan Green Lake Township (the United States)
- Coordinates: 44°38′37″N 85°45′56″W
- Country: United States
- State: Michigan
- County: Grand Traverse
- Organized: 1883

Government
  - Supervisor: Marvin Radtke Jr.

Area
  - Total: 36.3 sq mi (94.1 km^{2})
  - Land: 29.4 sq mi (76.1 km^{2})
  - Water: 6.9 sq mi (18.0 km^{2})
- Elevation: 840 ft (256 m)

Population (2020)
  - Total: 6,703
  - Estimate (2025): 6,822
  - Density: 185/sq mi (71.3/km^{2})
- Time zone: UTC-5 (Eastern (EST))
  - Summer (DST): UTC-4 (EDT)
- ZIP code(s): 49637 (Grawn); 49643 (Interlochen); 49685 (Traverse City)
- Area code: 231
- FIPS code: 26-34960
- GNIS feature ID: 1626397
- Website: https://www.gogreenlake.org/

Green Lake Township is a civil township of Grand Traverse County in the U.S. state of Michigan. The population was 6,703 at the 2020 census, an increase from 5,784 at the 2010 census. The township is named after Green Lake, one of two large lakes in the township (the other being Duck Lake).

The township is the home of Interlochen Center for the Arts, an arts boarding school. Interlochen State Park is also within the township.

== History ==
Green Lake Township was organized in 1883, from part of Blair Township. This makes it the newest township in Grand Traverse County.

Interlochen Center for the Arts was established in Green Lake Township in 1928 by Joseph E. Maddy.

On September 17, 2026, an F-16 fighter jet from the 149th Fighter Wing of the Texas Air National Guard crashed while training near the Glacier Ponds neighborhood of eastern Green Lake Township. While the pilot ejected safely, an area within a 1-mile (1.6 km) radius was evacuated due to hazardous chemicals spilled.

== Geography ==
According to the United States Census Bureau, the township has a total area of 36.3 square miles (94 km^{2}), of which 29.4 square miles (76 km^{2}) is land and 6.9 square miles (18 km^{2}) (19.10%) is water. The township is located in the west of Grand Traverse County, sharing a boundary with Benzie County.

Green Lake Township's most notable features are the two large lakes within its borders, Green Lake and Duck Lake. Interlochen Center for the Arts and Interlochen State Park are located on the isthmus between these two lakes. Additionally, a small portion of Long Lake extends into Green Lake Township from the north. The headwaters of the Platte River at Long Lake are within the township.

The Green Lake Airport is a small, unpaved airport located in the south of the township.

=== Adjacent townships ===
- Long Lake Township (north)
- Garfield Township (northeast)
- Blair Township (east)
- Mayfield Township (southeast)
- Grant Township (south)
- Colfax Township, Benzie County (southwest)
- Inland Township, Benzie County (west)
- Almira Township, Benzie County (northwest)

=== Major highways ===
- US 31 runs east–west through the township. To the west, the highway enters Benzie County, and runs south along Lake Michigan. To the east, the highway turns northbound, and runs through Traverse City. Further north, the highway runs north, again along Lake Michigan, to Mackinaw City via Charlevoix and Petoskey.
- M-137 is a former highway that ran entirely within Green Lake Township. A north–south highway, it connected US 31 to Interlochen Center for the Arts and Interlochen State Park, along a road now known as J. Maddy Parkway.

== Communities ==
- Grawn is a census-designated place located immediately east of the township.
- Diamond Park is a small resort community on the western shores of Green Lake (44°37′40.3″N 85°47′16.6″W).
- Duck Lake Park is a small community on the southeastern shore of Duck Lake (44°37′07.9″N 85°43′40.4″W).
- Duck Lake Peninsula is a residential community on the peninsula in Duck Lake (44°37′45.8″N 85°44′20.7″W).
- Interlochen is a census-designated place within the township known for the Interlochen Center for the Arts (44°38′43″N 85°46′02″W).
- Monroe Center is an unincorporated community on the border with Blair Township (44°36′49.1″N 85°41′47.4″W)
- Peninsula Resort is a ghost town and residential community on the peninsula in Green Lake (44°37′07.2″N 85°46′42.8″W)
- Wylie is a ghost town that has been enveloped by the Interlochen Center for the Arts (44°38′02″N 85°45′58.9″W).

== Demographics ==
As of the census of 2020, there were 6,703 people, 2,437 households, residing in the township. The population density was 184.7 inhabitants per square mile (71.3/km^{2}). The racial makeup of the township was 93.2% White, 0.8% African American, 0.7% Native American, 0% Asian, 0.5% Pacific Islander, and 2% from two or more races. Hispanic or Latino of any race were 4.8% of the population.

There were 2,437 households, out of which 16% had children under the age of 18 living with them and 15.2% had someone living in the dwelling who was 65 years of age or older. The average household size was 2.5.

In the township the population was not very spread out, with 16% under the age of 18, and 15.2% who were 65 years of age or older. 68.8% of the township fell into the 18-65 age range. The median age was 36 years. For every 100 males, there were 96.8 females.

The median income for a household in the township was $72,656, and the per capita income was $35,652. About 6.9% of the population were below the poverty line.
