= Grawn, Michigan =

- Census-designated place (CDP) & unincorporated community
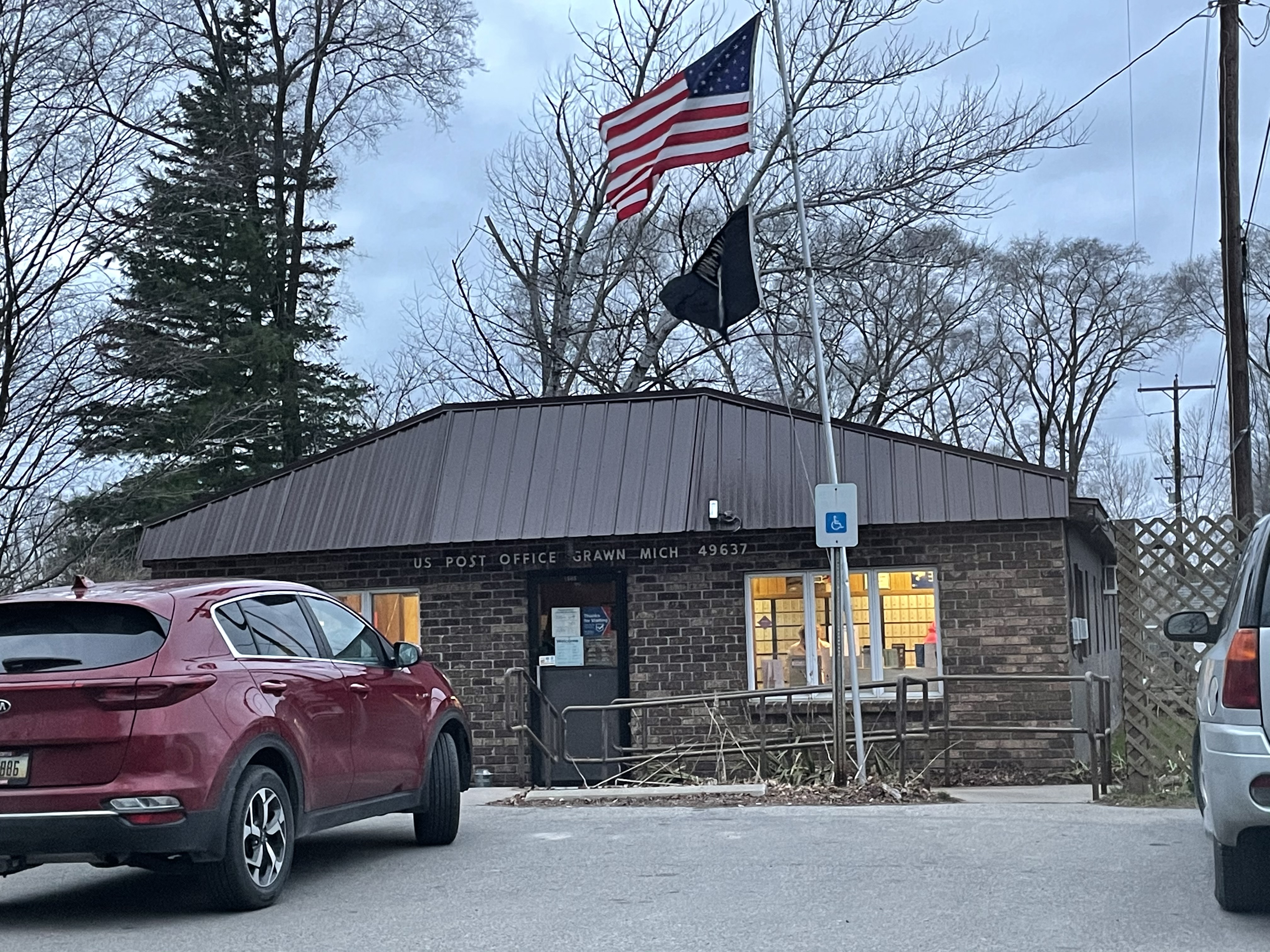
- U.S. Post Office in Grawn

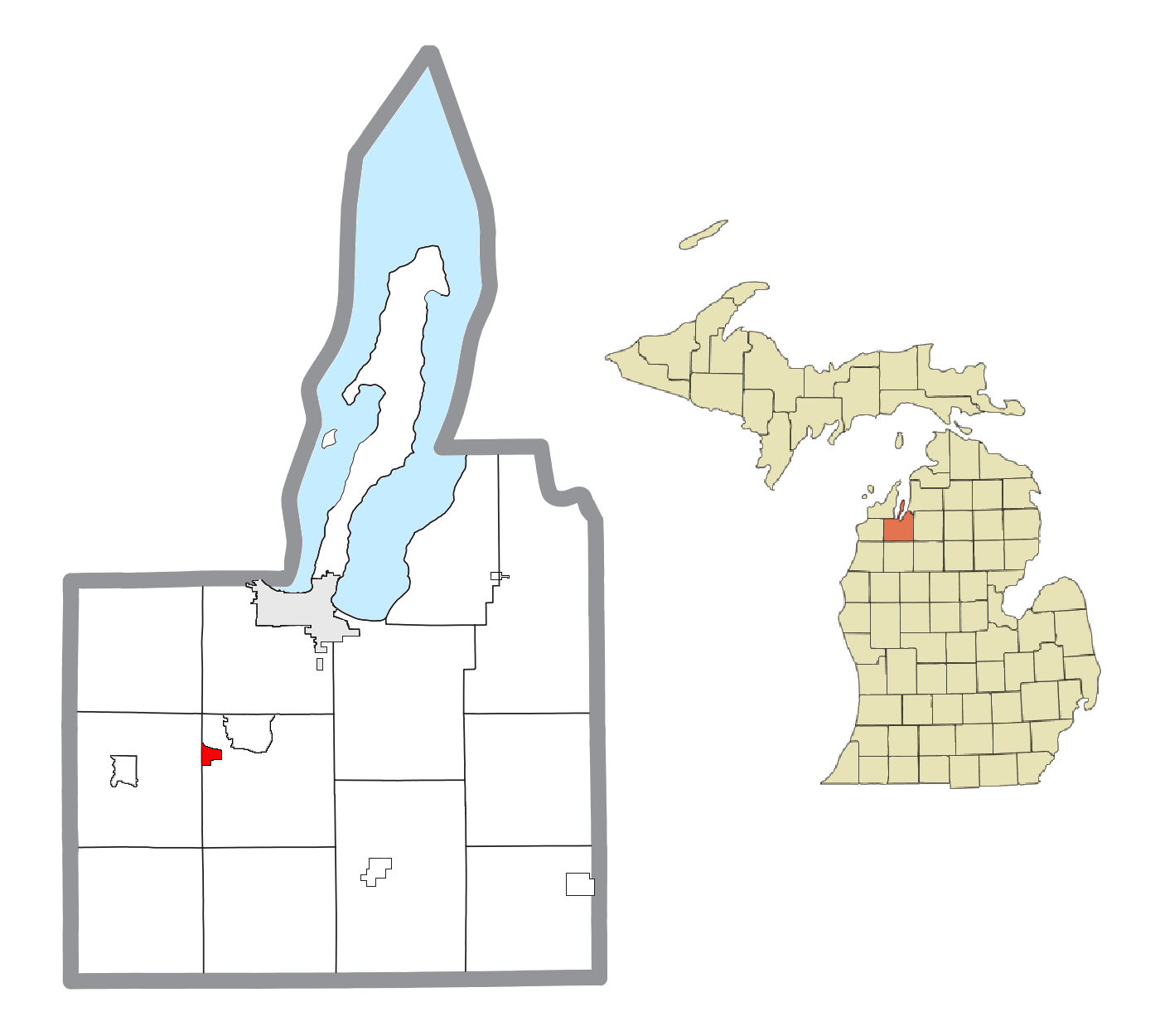
- Location within Grand Traverse County

- Location within the state of Michigan Location within the United States
- Coordinates: 44°39′45″N 85°41′36″W
- Country: United States
- State: Michigan
- County: Grand Traverse
- Township: Blair

Area
  - Total: 0.65 sq mi (1.69 km^{2})
  - Land: 0.65 sq mi (1.69 km^{2})
  - Water: 0 sq mi (0.00 km^{2})
- Elevation: 889 ft (271 m)

Population (2020)
  - Total: 816
  - Density: 1,253.2/sq mi (483.87/km^{2})
- Time zone: UTC-5 (Eastern (EST))
  - Summer (DST): UTC-4 (EDT)
- ZIP code(s): 49637; 49685 (Traverse City)
- Area code: 231
- GNIS feature ID: 627256
- FIPS code: 26-34620

Grawn (/ɡrɔːn/) is an unincorporated community and census-designated place (CDP) in Grand Traverse County in the U.S. state of Michigan. It is part of Traverse City micropolitan area.

At the 2020 census, the community's population was 816. The community is located within Blair Township on the border with Green Lake Township.

== History ==
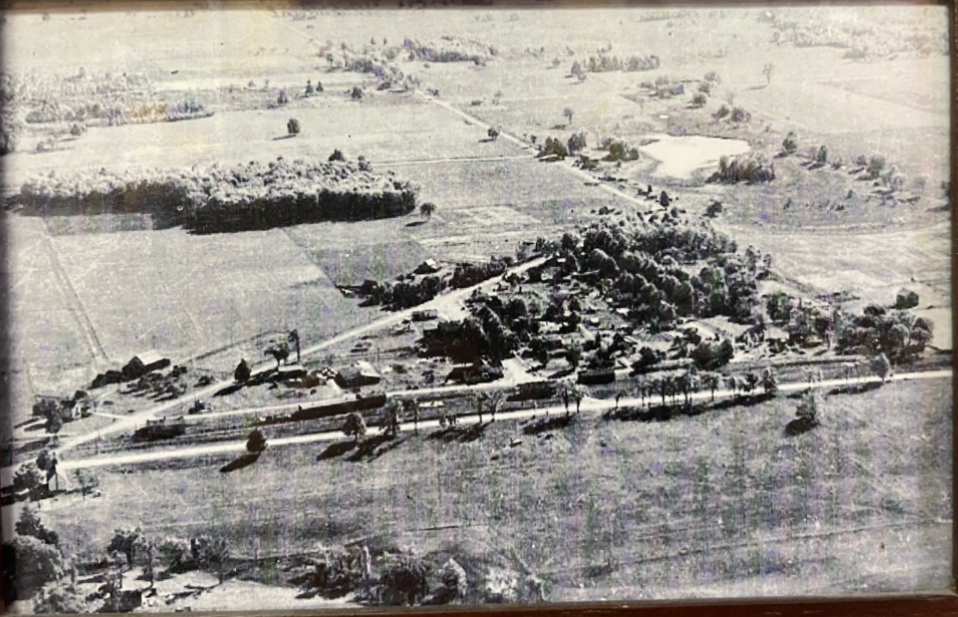
Historic view of the community

Grawn was founded in the 1870s as Blackwood after its first settler, James B. Blackwood. The Chicago and West Michigan Railway was built through Blackwood in 1890, and the village was renamed to Grawn Station, after Charles T. Grawn, the former superintendent of Central Michigan Normal School, and later the superintendent of Traverse City Area Public Schools. In the same year, the name was shortened to Grawn, and the village was given a post office with William H. Gibbs serving as the first postmaster. By 1905, potatoes had become the main crop of Grawn.

In December 1995, a fire broke out at Carl's Tire Retreading Company in Grawn. The fire burned for 20 days and led to the evacuation of locals and of Blair Elementary School. In 2003, PFAS were found at the site and in local wells as a result of chemicals used to extinguish the fire.

The community of Grawn was listed as a newly organized census-designated place for the 2010 census, meaning that it now has officially defined boundaries and population statistics.

On September 17, 2026, an F-16 fighter jet belonging to the 149th Fighter Wing of the Texas Air National Guard crashed in a residential area south of Grawn during a routine training mission. While the pilot ejected safely, an area within a 1-mile (1.6 km) radius was evacuated due to hazardous chemicals spilled.

== Geography ==
According to the U.S. Census Bureau, Grawn has a total area of 0.63 square miles (1.63 km^{2}), all land.

=== Major highways ===
- US 31 runs west–east at this portion of its route through the center of the community.

== Demographics ==
Historical population
Census	Pop.	Note	%±
2010	772		—
2020	816		5.7%
U.S. Decennial Census

== Education ==
The community is served by Traverse City Area Public Schools.
