= Sabin Dam =

- Interactive map of Sabin Dam
- Location: Garfield Township, Grand Traverse County, Michigan, U.S.
- Coordinates: 44.7080°N 85.6230°W
- Purpose: Hydropower generation (formerly)
- Construction began: 1906
- Demolition date: 2018
- Owner: Grand Traverse County

Dam and spillways
- Type of dam: Hydropower
- Impounds: Boardman River
- Spillways: 2

Reservoir
- Creates: Sabin Pond

Power Station
- Decommission date: 2005
- Turbines: 2 (1906-1960’s); 1 (1980’s-2018). Both configurations used vertical Francis turbines.
- Installed capacity: 500kW

Sabin Dam was a hydroelectric dam on the Boardman River in Grand Traverse County, Michigan. It was owned by the county as a recreational site, but it was formerly owned and used by Traverse City Light & Power. The dam was located about 5.3 miles (8.5 km) upstream from the mouth of the Boardman River at Grand Traverse Bay.

== History ==
In 1906, Sabin Dam was the third dam built on the Boardman River. Sabin was enlarged and rebuilt in 1914, and again in 1930 along with Boardman Dam. These dams ran fluently, producing hydroelectricity on the Boardman for nearby towns like Traverse City and Chums Corner. In the 1960’s, both Boardman and Sabin Dams were abandoned, and then in the late 1980’s they were revitalized and refitted with new generation equipment. Sabin had an installed capacity of 500kW with one turbine. The other wheelpit (Sabin originally had 2 turbines before being abandoned) was used only to pass excess water through the powerhouse. In 2005, all of the hydroelectric dams on the river were decommissioned. In 2013 and 2017, Brown Bridge and Boardman Dams were removed, respectively. Sabin was the last to be removed. It was proposed that in 2018, Sabin Dam would be removed, letting the Boardman River flow in its original channel. The proposal was followed through and in 2018 the Sabin Dam was removed.

== Recreation and nature ==
The dam pond used to have little to no recreation uses on the water, but there are a series of trails along the western side of the used to be pond. The Boardman River Nature Center is also just to the west of where the dam used to be.
