= Traverse City Beach Bums =

Defunct professional baseball team in Traverse City, Michigan

- 2006–2018; Chums Corner, Michigan
Team logo
Cap insignia

Minor league affiliations
- Class: Independent (2006–2018)
- League: Frontier League (2006–2018)
- Division: East Division (2008–2018); Central Division (2007); East Division (2006)

Minor league titles
- League titles (1): 2015
- Division titles (1): 2012

Team data
- Name: Traverse City Beach Bums (2006–2018)
- Colors: Navy, gold, white, brown, light brown
- Ballpark: Wuerfel Park (2006–2018)
- Owner(s)/ Operator(s): John and Leslye Wuerfel

The Traverse City Beach Bums were a professional baseball team based in Chums Corner, Michigan, a southern suburb of Traverse City. The Beach Bums played in the independent Frontier League. The team played at Wuerfel Park.

The Beach Bums were established in 2006 when the Richmond Roosters franchise was purchased and moved from Richmond, Indiana. In 2018, the franchise was sold to the owners of the West Michigan Whitecaps who folded the Frontier League affiliation and launched a new team in the Northwoods League, the Traverse City Pit Spitters.

== Richmond Roosters ==
The Richmond Roosters joined the Frontier League in 1995. Richmond won back-to-back Frontier League championships in 2001 and 2002. The Richmond ownership selected to sell the franchise at the conclusion of the 2005 season.

== Traverse City Beach Bums ==
The Beach Bums were Traverse City's first professional baseball team since 1914. Predecessors included the semi-professional Traverse City Hustlers of the 1890s, and the Class D minor league Traverse City Resorters (1910–1914). Following the 2004 season, the Frontier League granted a franchise for Traverse City, however the league was not sure whether to consider the team for expansion or relocation. Then, in 2005, the Richmond Roosters were purchased and the franchise moved to Traverse City.

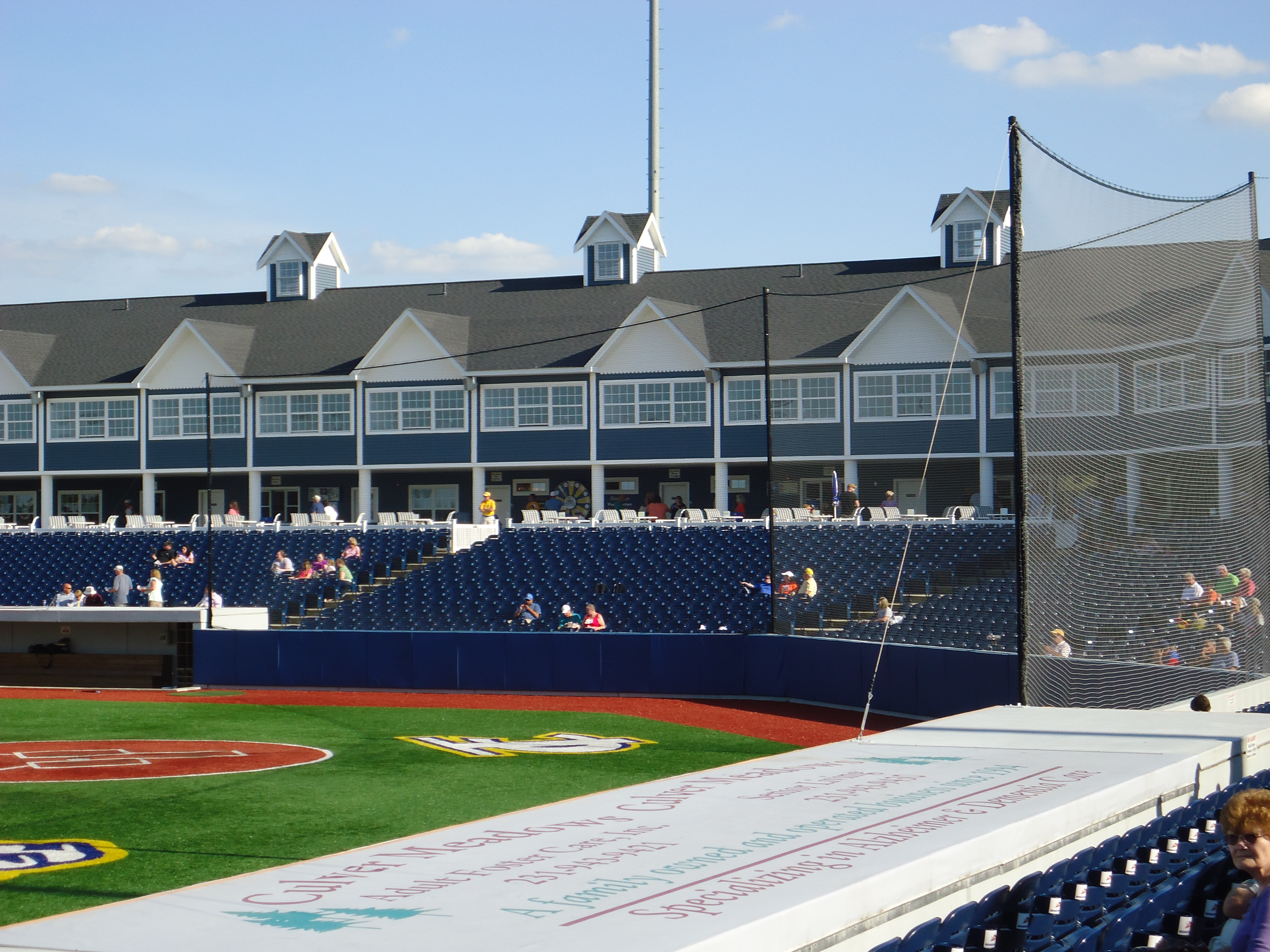
Wuerfel Park, 2010

The move and a slow start in Traverse City led to a 7-year franchise absence from post-season play. The Beach Bums advanced to the 2010 Frontier League championship, dropping the series 3–1 to the River City Rascals. Enrique Lechuga (10–3, 2.88 ERA), closer Scott Mueller (4-4, 2.04 ERA, 14 saves), and Chase Burch (.299 BA, 19 HR, 88 RBI) paced Traverse City. The team then established consistency with players such 2012 Frontier League MVP Jose Vargas (.290 BA, 29 HR, 100 RBI) but lost in the division series in 2012 and 2013. The Beach Bums added to the franchise championship history in 2015, advancing from a play-in game to take the title in a best of five series sweep, defeating the River City Rascals 3–0. The 2015 Bums were led by pitchers Ian MacDougall (10–6, 2.51 ERA), Kramer Champlin (10–6, 2.05 ERA) and Andrew Brockett (3–0, 1.54 ERA, 21 saves), along with 3B Jose Vargas (.314 BA, 10 HR, 51 RBI) and OF Brandon Jacobs (.320 BA, 17 HR, 54 RBI).

Declining attendance led to the team being sold at the conclusion of the 2018 season to owners of the Midwest League West Michigan Whitecaps. The franchise left the Frontier League to join the summer collegiate baseball Northwoods League, and the team's name was changed to the Traverse City Pit Spitters. The stadium was renamed to Turtle Creek Stadium after the sale. The franchise's final Frontier League professional game was an 8–5 win over the Windy City ThunderBolts, played at Wuerfel Park on September 2, 2018, before 2,864 spectators.

The team is represented in the Frontier League Hall of Fame by pitcher Scott Dunn and first baseman Chase Burch.

== Season-by-season records ==
Traverse City Beach Bums
Year	W-L	PCT	Place	Postseason
2006	57-39	.594	3rd in FL East	
2007	46-50	.479	4th in FL Central	
2008	50-46	.521	2nd in FL East	
2009	42-53	.442	5th in FL East	
2010	55-41	.573	2nd in FL East	League Division Series: Defeated the Windy City Thunderbolts 3–1; Frontier League Championship Series: Lost vs. River City Rascals 1–3
2011	51-45	.531	3rd in FL East	
2012	64-32	.667	1st in FL East	League Division Series: Lost vs. Southern Illinois Miners 0–3
2013	55-41	.573	2nd in FL East	League Division Series: Lost vs. Lake Erie Crushers 2–3
2014	38-58	.396	6th in FL East	
2015	56-38	.596	2nd in FL East	League Play-in Game: Won vs. Rockford Aviators 5–1; Frontier League Division Series: Won vs. Normal CornBelters 2–0; Frontier League Championship Series: Won vs. River City Rascals 3–0; Frontier League Champions
2016	42-52	.447	4th in FL East	
2017	37-59	.385	6th in FL East	
2018	44-51	.463	5th in FL East	
Totals	615-573	.518		
Playoffs	12-9	.571		1 Division Title, 4 Playoff Appearances, 1 Championship
