= East Bay Township, Michigan =

- Charter township
- East Bay Charter Township
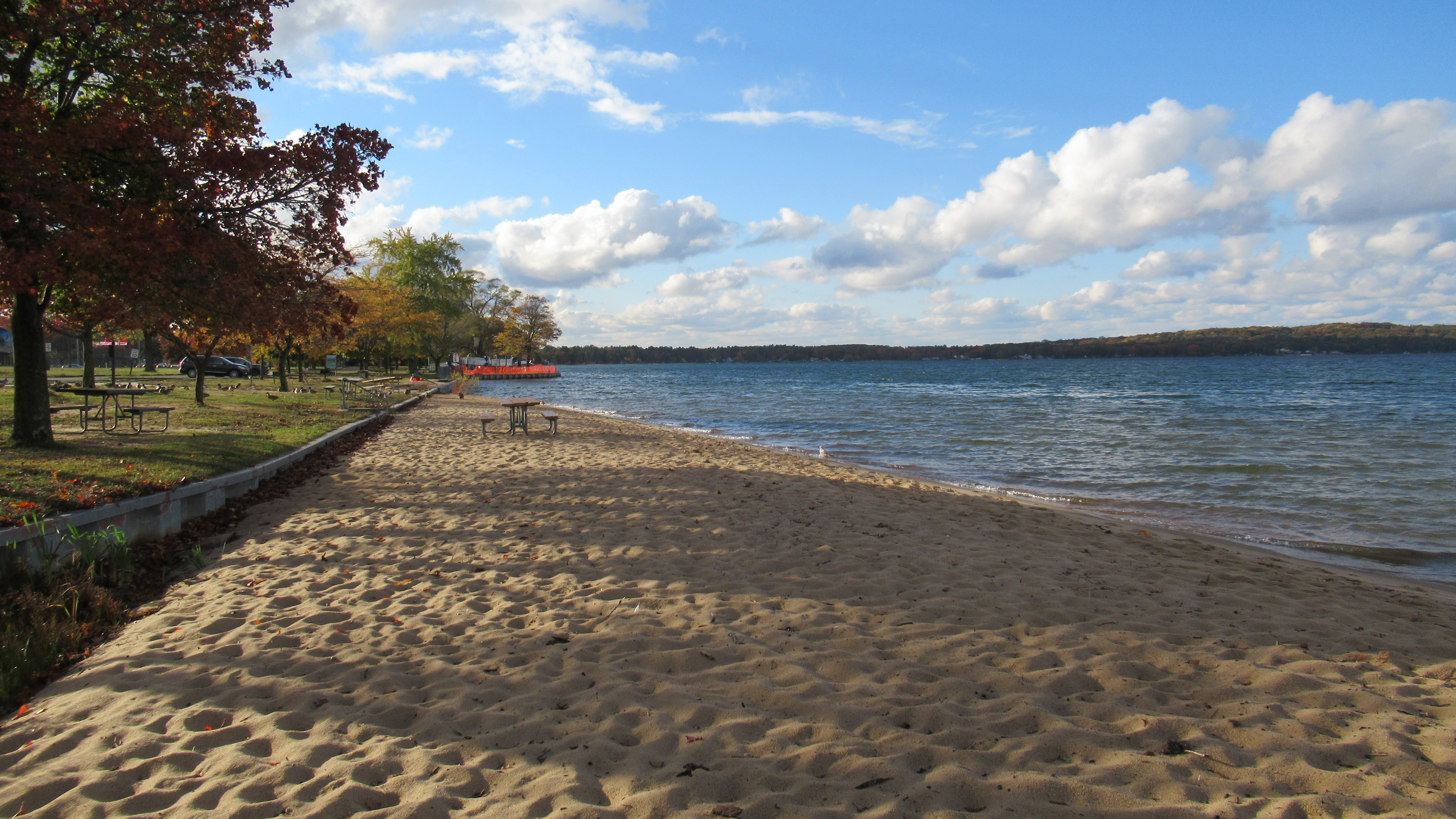
- Beachfront along Grand Traverse Bay at Traverse City State Park

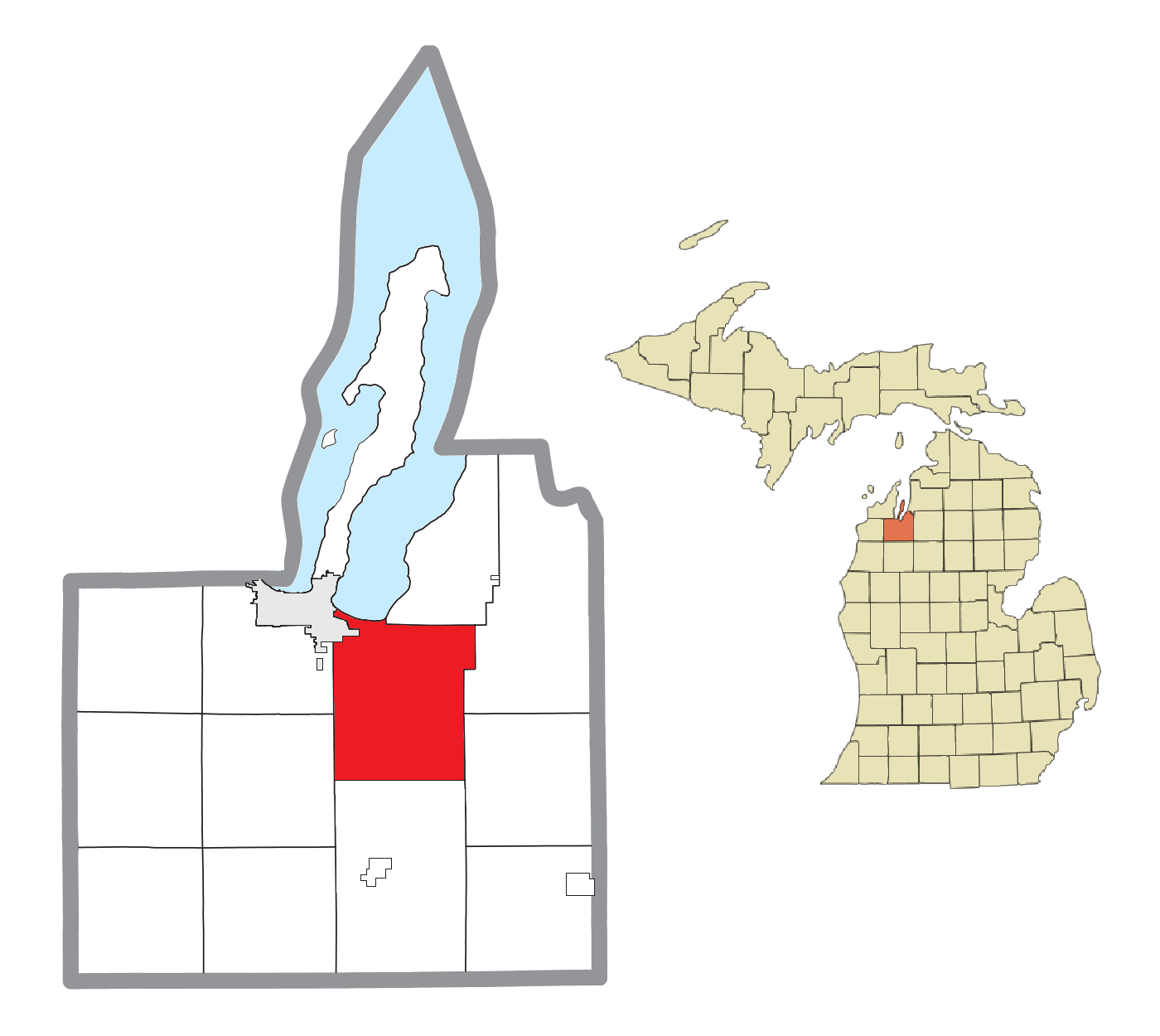
- Location within Grand Traverse County

- Location within the state of Michigan
- Coordinates: 44°42′05″N 85°31′14″W
- Country: United States
- State: Michigan
- County: Grand Traverse
- Organized: January 1867
- Named for: East Arm of Grand Traverse Bay

Government
  - Supervisor: Beth Friend
  - Clerk: Susanne Courtade

Area
  - Total: 42.4 sq mi (109.7 km^{2})
  - Land: 39.9 sq mi (103.4 km^{2})
  - Water: 2.4 sq mi (6.3 km^{2})
- Elevation: 920 ft (280 m)

Population (2020)
  - Total: 11,589
  - Estimate (2025): 11,780
  - Density: 250/sq mi (96/km^{2})
- Time zone: UTC-5 (Eastern (EST))
  - Summer (DST): UTC-4 (EDT)
- ZIP code(s): 49686, 49696 (Traverse City); 49690 (Williamsburg)
- Area code: 231
- FIPS code: 26-23800
- GNIS feature ID: 1626202
- Website: Official website

East Bay Charter Township is a charter township of Grand Traverse County in the U.S. state of Michigan. The population was 11,589 at the 2020 census, up from 10,663 at the 2010 census. It is one of three charter townships in Grand Traverse County, and is the second-most populous township in Northern Michigan, behind neighboring Garfield Township.

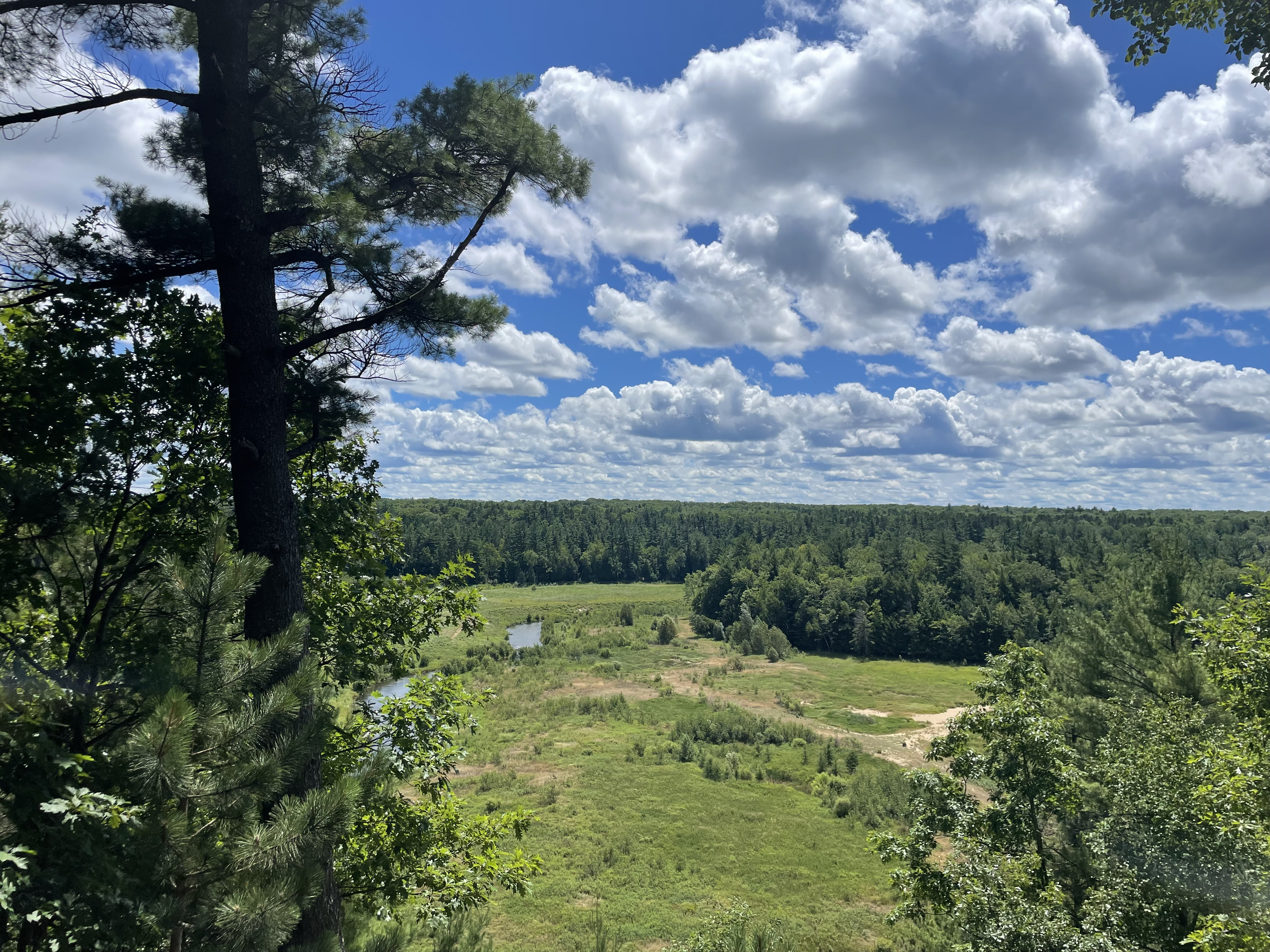
The Boardman River valley in the south of East Bay Township.

The northern portion of the township is adjacent to Traverse City and is part of that city's urban area. The southern portion remains largely rural, with many small lakes. East Bay Township is the location of Traverse City State Park.

== History ==
East Bay Township was organized in January 1867.

== Geography ==
According to the United States Census Bureau, the township has a total area of 42.3 square miles (110 km^{2}), of which 39.9 square miles (103 km^{2}) is land and 2.4 square miles (6.2 km^{2}) (5.76%) is water.

The township lies at the head of the East Arm of Grand Traverse Bay, from which the township takes its name. The north of East Bay Township is heavily urbanized, while the south remains more rural, with rolling hills, dense forests, and kettle lakes. Traverse City State Park is located in the northwest of the township, along the shore of East Bay.

The Boardman River flows through the south of the township. The township is home to many lakes that are part of its watershed, including Arbutus Lake and Spider Lake.

=== Adjacent townships ===
- Acme Township (north)
- Whitewater Township (northeast)
- Union Township (southeast)
- Paradise Township (south)
- Blair Township (southwest)
- Garfield Township (west)
- Traverse City (northwest)

=== Major highways ===
US Highway 31 and M-72 share a concurrency in the north of the township, paralleling the Grand Traverse Bay shoreline as a major east–west thoroughfare. Grand Traverse County Road 660 (Hammond Road) serves as another east–west local thoroughfare, primarily used to bypass Traverse City to the south.

== Communities ==
- Devils Elbow is an unincorporated community within the township at 44°41′12″N 85°28′55″W.
- East Bay is a ghost town near the mouth of Mitchell Creek, at 44°44′56.5″N 85°33′28.5″W. The community was founded in 1868 as East Traverse Bay, renamed to Traverse Bay in 1873 and to East Bay in 1874. A post office at the location operated from 1868 to 1879. Today, the community is largely urbanized, and is located nearby Traverse City State Park.
- Forest Lakes is a resort community in the south of the township (44°40′32″N 85°29′58.6″W).
- Holiday Hills is another sprawling suburban community in the north of the township, shared with Acme Township.
- Pine Grove is a suburban neighborhood immediately adjacent to the border with Traverse City. The neighborhood, which is also adjacent to Cherry Capital Airport, was identified as contaminated by PFAS in 2020. It is located at 44°45′00.8″N 85°34′04.4″W.
- The city of Traverse City is adjacent to the township, bordering it to the northwest.

== Demographics ==
Historical population
Census	Pop.	Note	%±
1980	6,212		—
1990	8,307		33.7%
2000	9,919		19.4%
2010	10,663		7.5%
2020	11,589		8.7%
2025 (est.)	11,780	▲	1.6%
U.S. Decennial Census

As of the census of 2000, there were 9,919 people, 3,694 households, and 2,737 families residing in the township. The population density was 248.6 inhabitants per square mile (96.0/km^{2}). There were 4,339 housing units at an average density of 108.7 per square mile (42.0/km^{2}). The racial makeup of the township was 97.31% White, 0.22% African American, 0.87% Native American, 0.60% Asian, 0.01% Pacific Islander, 0.29% from other races, and 0.70% from two or more races. Hispanic or Latino of any race were 1.25% of the population.

There were 3,694 households, out of which 39.4% had children under the age of 18 living with them, 61.7% were married couples living together, 8.6% had a female householder with no husband present, and 25.9% were non-families. 19.7% of all households were made up of individuals, and 5.1% had someone living alone who was 65 years of age or older. The average household size was 2.68 and the average family size was 3.09.

In the township the population was spread out, with 28.4% under the age of 18, 7.5% from 18 to 24, 32.0% from 25 to 44, 24.0% from 45 to 64, and 8.2% who were 65 years of age or older. The median age was 36 years. For every 100 females, there were 99.3 males. For every 100 females age 18 and over, there were 97.9 males.

The median income for a household in the township was $47,569, and the median income for a family was $54,250. Males had a median income of $34,118 versus $23,580 for females. The per capita income for the township was $21,427. About 1.9% of families and 3.3% of the population were below the poverty line, including 2.0% of those under age 18 and 3.2% of those age 65 or over.
