= Cass Street Bridge =

Cass Street Bridge may refer to:

- American Legion Memorial Bridge, Traverse City, Michigan
- Mississippi River Bridge, La Crosse, Wisconsin
