= Boardman River Nature Center =

Nature center

Coordinates: 44.7076°N 85.6249°W

- Location within Michigan
- Location: 1450 Cass Road; Traverse City, Michigan
- Area: 505 acres (204 ha)
- Established: 2008
- Governing body: Grand Traverse Conservation District
- Website: natureiscalling.org/boardman-river-nature-center

The Boardman River Nature Center is a nature center in Traverse City, Michigan. It is operated by the Grand Traverse Conservation District, a regional parkland authority. The nature center is dedicated to educating residents of Grand Traverse County about the animals and plants of the area, especially those native to the Boardman River valley.

== Description ==
The Nature Center serves as the interpretive center and management headquarters for the Grand Traverse Natural Education Reserve, a 505-acre local park and natural area. The Conservation District reports that the Reserve contains Northern Michigan woodlands and wetlands. Local fauna center on small game of varieties once harvested in the local fur trade, including whitetail deer, red fox, mink, and otter. A segment of flowing water is often dammed by a family of beaver to create an active beaver pond.

The park reserve features ponds and wetlands of the Boardman River above Boardman Lake. 7 miles of trails give visitors access to the resources of the Reserve.
