= Silver Lake (Grand Traverse County, Michigan) =

Lake in Grand Traverse County, Michigan, USA

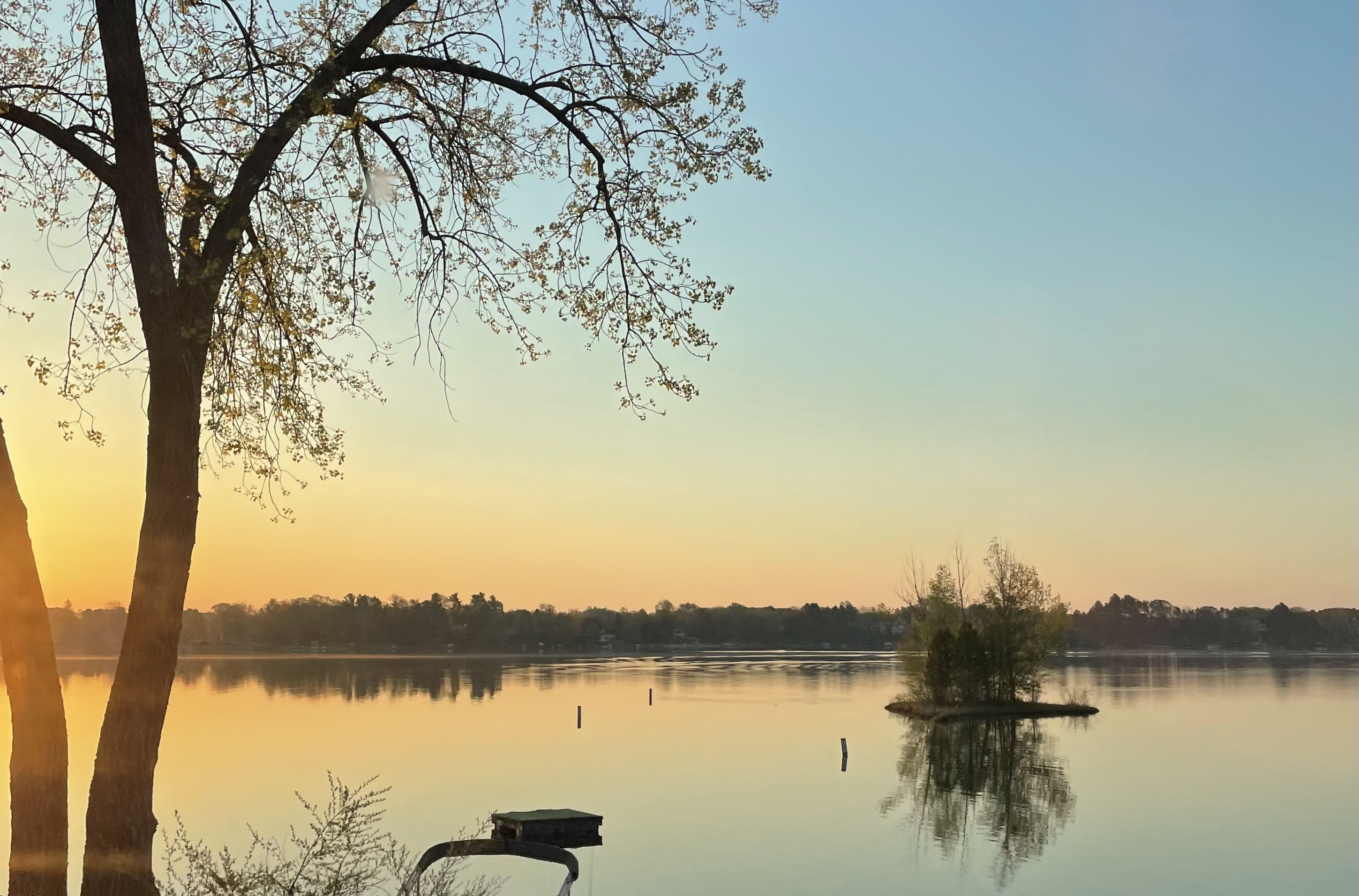
- A small island in Silver Lake

- Location within Michigan Location within the United States
- Location: Grand Traverse County, Michigan (Garfield Township & Blair Township)
- Coordinates: 44°41′44″N 85°41′08″W
- Type: Kettle lake
- Part of: Grand Traverse Bay Watershed
- Primary inflows: Mud Lake
- Primary outflows: Beitner Creek
- Basin countries: United States
- Max. length: 3.45 mi (5.55 km)
- Max. width: 2,607 ft (795 m)
- Surface area: 600 acres (240 ha)
- Average depth: 23.4 ft (7.1 m)
- Max. depth: 96.0 ft (29.3 m)
- Surface elevation: 863 ft (263 m)
- Islands: Anderson/Montague Island, Drake Island, Moresby Island, Raspberry Island, Trega Island
- Settlements: Kratochvil's Plat (Ghost Town)

Silver Lake is a lake in Grand Traverse County, in the U.S. state of Michigan. It is roughly 3.5 miles (5.6 km) from the northern to southern ends. The lake is known for its pine coasts, irregular shoreline, and many peninsulas and islands, despite being smaller in size. Its maximum depth is 96 feet (29 m), making it the third deepest lake in Grand Traverse County. It is also the fourth-largest lake entirely within Grand Traverse County, after Long Lake, Green Lake, and Duck Lake.

== History ==
Silver Lake was originally named Lake Kratochvil, after the nearby town Kratochvil's Plat, which is now a ghost town. The lake was later renamed Silver Lake.

Until sometime in the early 1900s, Blair Township was known as "Silver Lake Township".

In 1965, the Silver Lake Improvement Association was established to promote the care and preservation of Silver Lake.

In 1987, the Grand Traverse County Drain Commission installed a high water outflow dam at the southern end of the lake.

== Recreation ==
Silver Lake is a local hotspot for fishing. It is known for its Bass, Bluegill, Perch, Pike, Lake sunfish, and Walleye. There is a public dock used for launching boats on the eastern shore of the lake. The Silver Lake Recreation Area is a park for people of all ages, and is located northeast of the lake. Holiday Park Campground is a large private campground on the southern end of the lake, just off of US 31. It has boat access and has RV camping lots surrounding the lake. Annually, there are regattas and fishing competitions on the lake.

The lake is popular in winter with ice fishers.

== See also ==
- List of lakes in Michigan
