= South Union Street–Boardman River Bridge =

- U.S. National Register of Historic Places
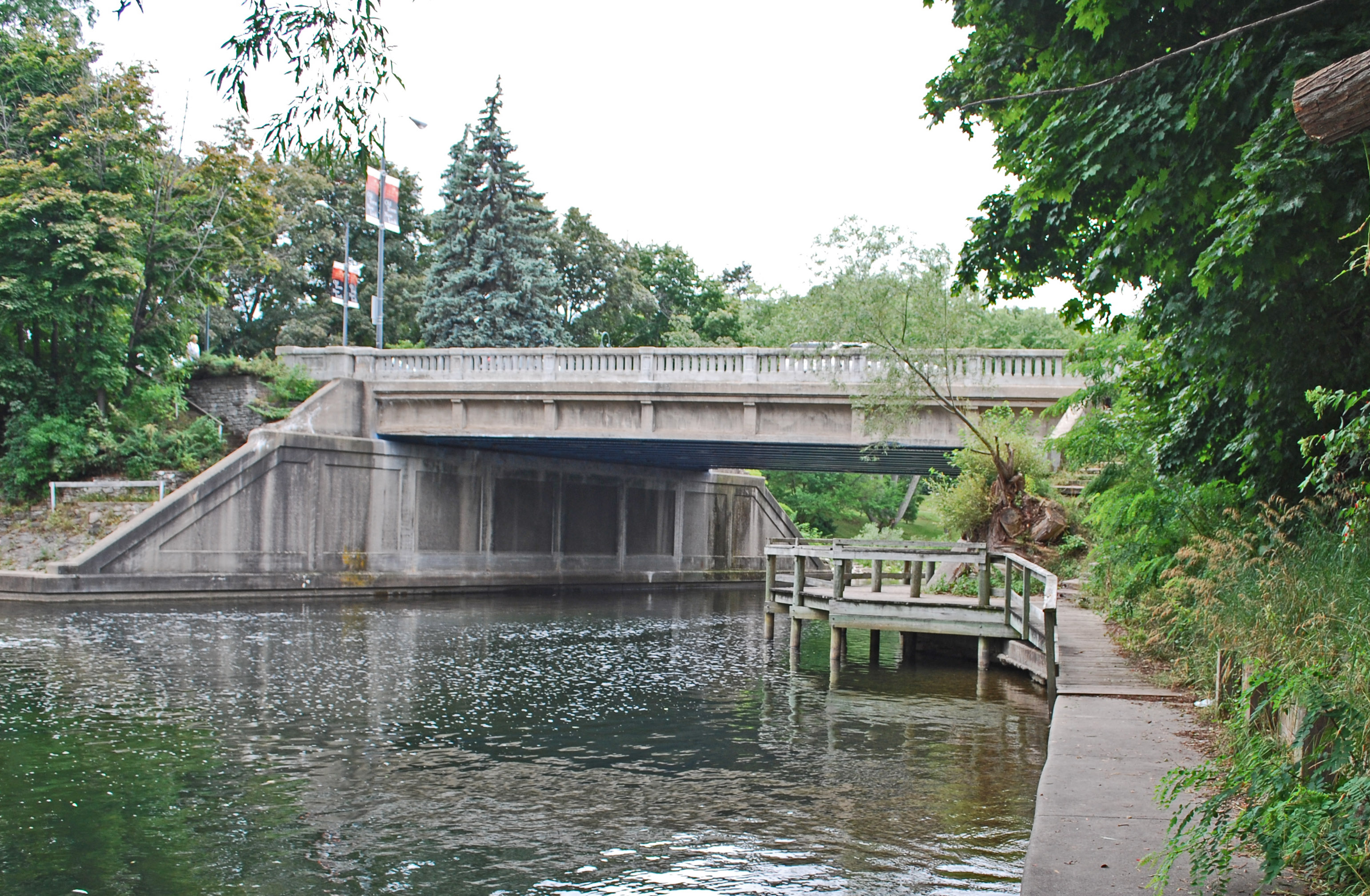

- Location within Michigan Location within the United States
- Interactive map
- Location: S. Union St. over Boardman R., Traverse City, Michigan
- Coordinates: 44°45′43″N 85°37′25″W
- Area: less than one acre
- Built: 1931
- Built by: L.W. Lamb
- Architectural style: Built-up girder bridge
- MPS: Highway Bridges of Michigan MPS
- NRHP reference No.: 99001651
- Added to NRHP: January 7, 2000

The South Union Street–Boardman River Bridge, also known as the Trunk Line Bridge, is a bridge located on South Union Street over the Boardman River in Traverse City, Michigan. It was listed on the National Register of Historic Places in 2000.

== Description ==
The South Union Street–Boardman River Bridge is 75 feet (23 m) and 40 feet (12 m) wide with a 73-foot (22 m) span over the Boardman River. A park with footpath runs underneath the bridge, and a dam and the attractive American Legion Memorial Bridge can be seen on each side of the bridge. Stairs lead down along the bridge to the river park beneath. The bridge is lined with a concrete balustrade railing with square spindles, and concrete parapets are at each end.

== History ==
In 1929, Traverse City undertook planning to replace the dangerous bridges crossing the Boardman River at Cass and Union Streets. However, the state of Michigan took responsibility for the Union Street Bridge, which then carried US 31. The state surveyed the existing bridge in late 1929, and sent plans for a new structure to the city in July 1930. Bids for the bridge were solicited, and in early 1931 Jackson contractor L. W. Lamb won the contract for $66,482. Additional expenditures brought the total price to almost $78,000. The bridge was completed in 1931, and was praised as an aesthetic success, fitting into its park surroundings and making an attractive gateway for the region's tourists.

Extensive renovation of the bridge is planned in 2023, including replacement of existing concrete deck and steel beams and the installation of a decorative pedestrian railing.
