= Blair Township, Michigan =

Blair Township
- Civil township
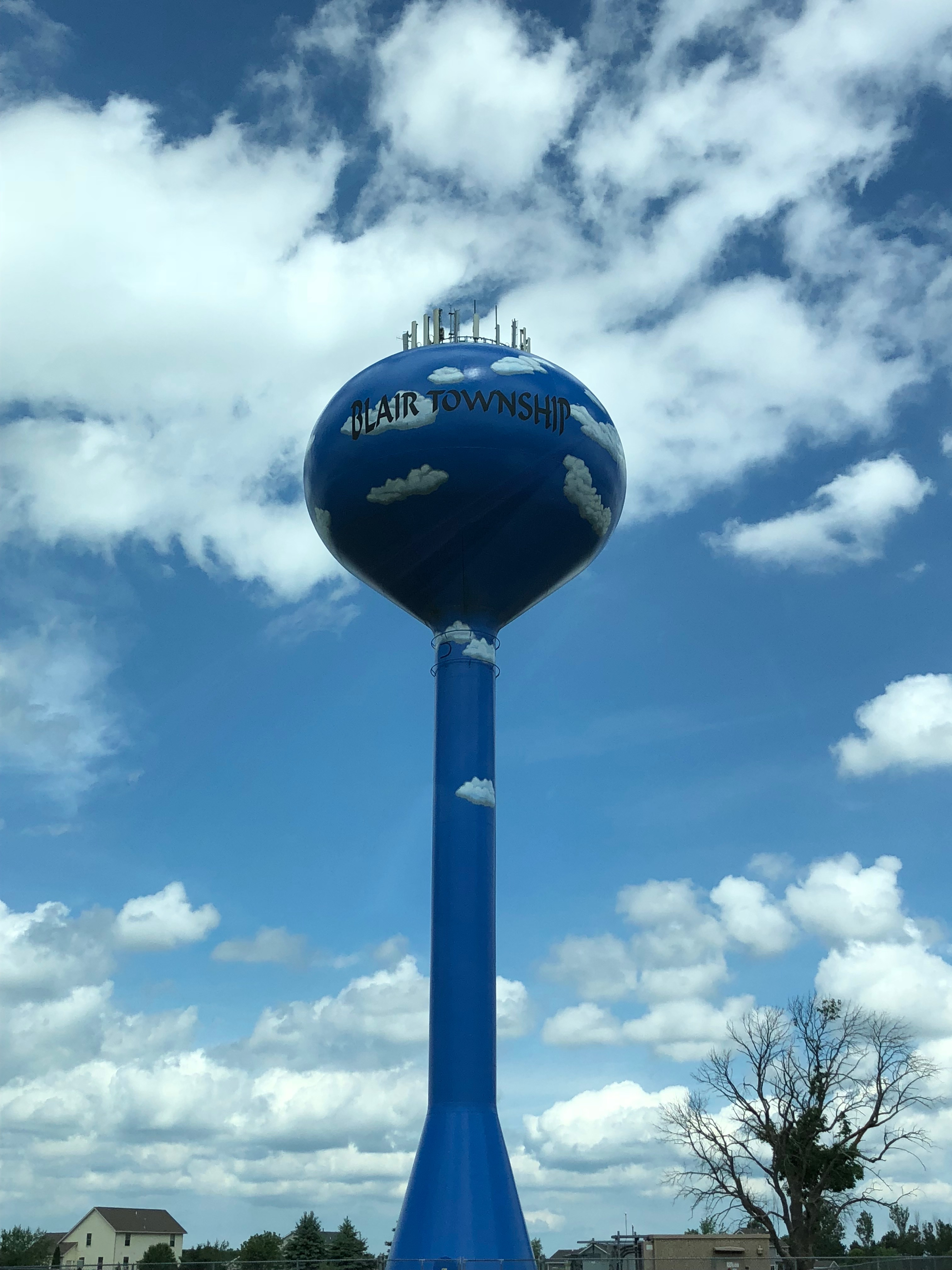
- Blair Township Water Tower

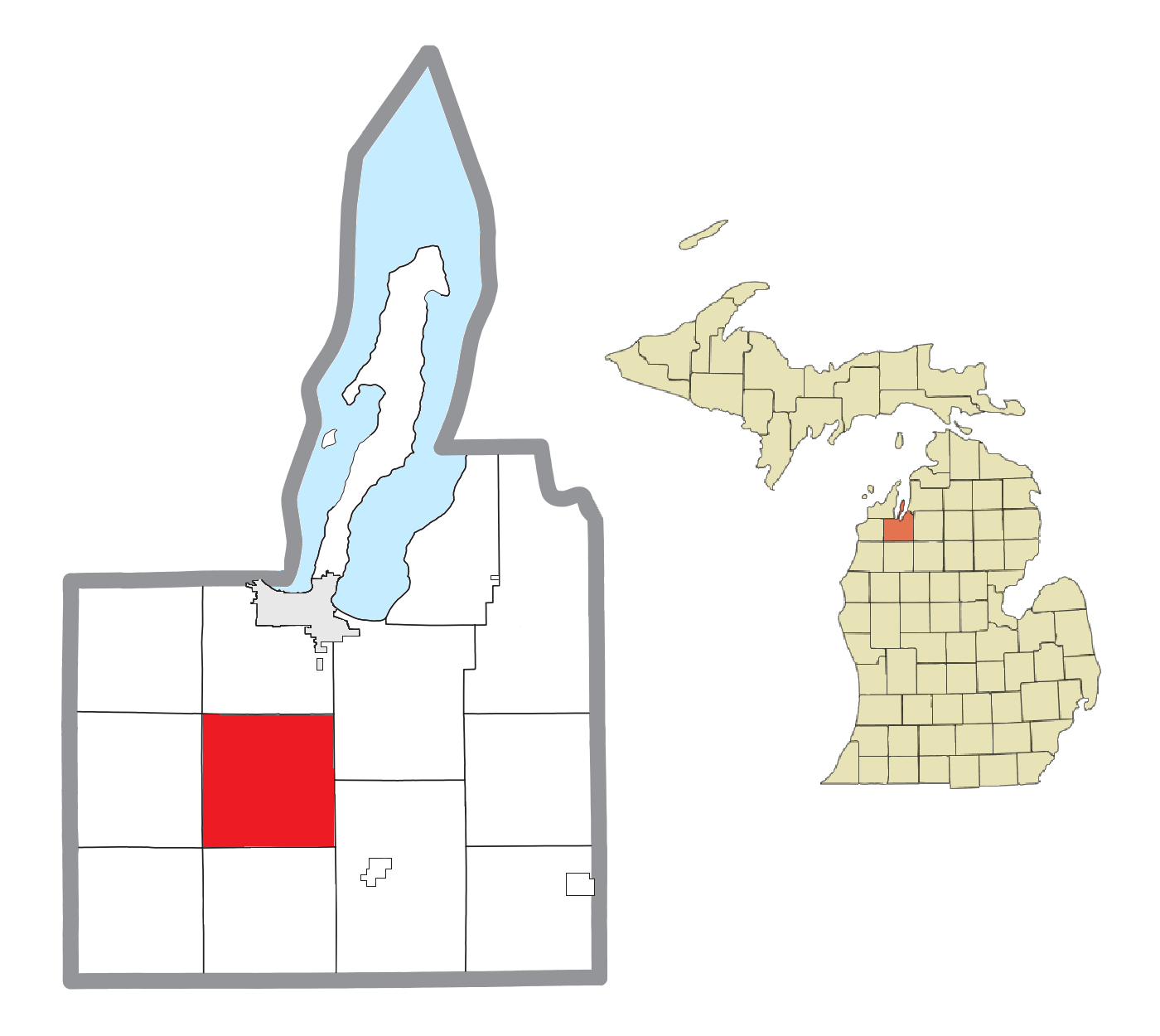
- Location within Grand Traverse County

- Location within the state of Michigan Blair Township (the United States)
- Coordinates: 44°39′18″N 85°38′48″W
- Country: United States
- State: Michigan
- County: Grand Traverse
- Established: 1867
- Named for: Governor Austin Blair

Government
  - Supervisor: Nicole Blonshine
  - Clerk: Lynette Wolfgang

Area
  - Total: 35.9 sq mi (93.1 km^{2})
  - Land: 35.6 sq mi (92.2 km^{2})
  - Water: 0.35 sq mi (0.9 km^{2})
- Elevation: 892 ft (272 m)

Population (2020)
  - Total: 8,994
  - Estimate (2025): 9,208
  - Density: 181/sq mi (69.9/km^{2})
- Time zone: UTC-5 (Eastern (EST))
  - Summer (DST): UTC-4 (EDT)
- ZIP code(s): 49637 (Grawn); 49649 (Kingsley); 49685, 49696 (Traverse City)
- Area code: 231
- FIPS code: 26-08880
- GNIS feature ID: 1625945
- Website: https://www.blairtownshipmi.gov/

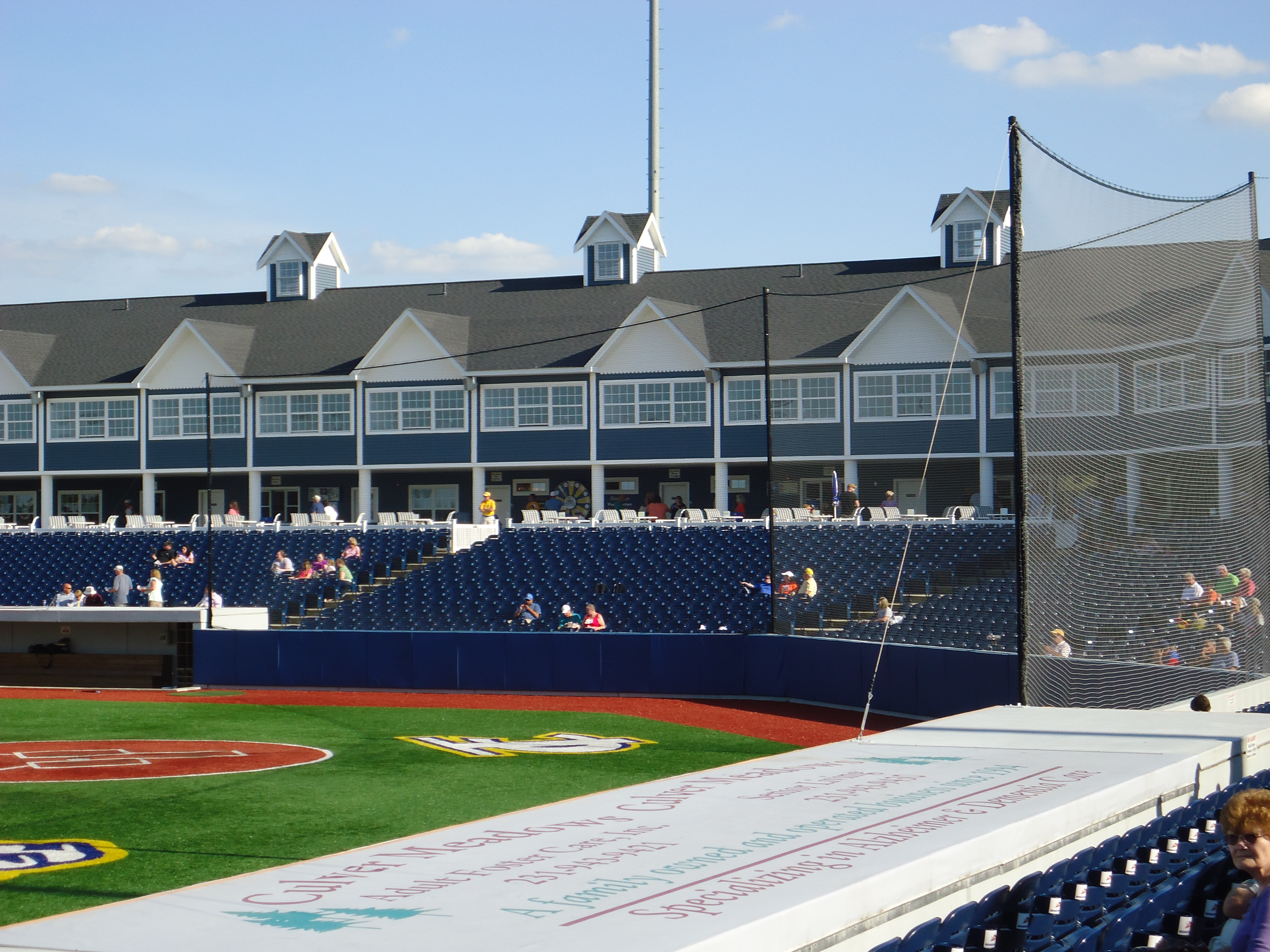
Turtle Creek Stadium, in northern Blair Township, is home to the Traverse City Pit Spitters

Blair Township (/blɛər/ BLAYR) is a civil township of Grand Traverse County in the U.S. state of Michigan. As of the 2020 census, the township had a population of 8,994, an increase from 8,209 at the 2010 census. The township lies about 4 miles (6.4 km) south of Traverse City, the largest city in Northern Michigan. Because of this proximity, much of the north of Blair Township is developed, especially within the township-administered communities of Chums Corner and Grawn, while much of the south of the township is rural in nature.

Blair Township is the location of Turtle Creek Stadium, the home stadium for the Traverse City Pit Spitters, a collegiate summer baseball team.

== History ==
The territory of Blair Township has historically been part of territory under the Council of Three Fires (Odawa, Ojibwe, and Potawatomi).

In 1853, Traverse Township was organized, and comprised all of Grand Traverse County excluding the Old Mission Peninsula. In April 1867, Blair Township was organized from the section of Traverse Township at 26 north, range 11 west. The township is named for Austin Blair, who served as Governor of Michigan during the American Civil War.

== Geography ==
According to the United States Census Bureau, the township has a total area of 36.0 square miles (93 km^{2}), of which 35.6 square miles (92 km^{2}) is land and 0.3 square miles (0.78 km^{2}) (0.95%) is water.

The township's largest lake is Silver Lake, which it shares with Garfield Township. The Boardman River briefly flows through the northeast of the township.

=== Adjacent townships ===
- Garfield Township (north)
- East Bay Township (northeast)
- Paradise Township (southeast)
- Mayfield Township (south)
- Grant Township (southwest)
- Green Lake Township (west)
- Long Lake Township (northwest)

=== Major highways ===
- US 31 runs north–south and east–west through the northwest of the township. The highway continues west toward Interlochen and Benzie County, and runs north to Traverse City.
- M-37 runs north–south through the township. To the south, M-37 continues toward Buckley and Mesick, and to the north with US 31 to Traverse City.

== Communities ==
- Beitner is a ghost town located at 44°40′19.1″N 85°38′13.9″W. Beitner, founded in 1878, was the location of a lumber mill west of the Boardman River, and was given a station on the Chicago and West Michigan Railway the same year. A post office opened at Beitner in 1880, however it was transferred to nearby Keystone in 1883. The Beitner office was re-established in 1893, only to be closed again in 1895.
- Chums Corner is a census-designated place where US 31 meets M-37.
- Grawn is a census-designated place where US 31 meets Silver Lake Road.
- Hilltop is an unincorporated community at 44°36′42″N 85°39′22″W.
- Keystone is a ghost town at 44°40′47.6″N 85°37′48.7″W. Keystone was established in 1874 as a station on the Chicago and West Michigan Railway, east of the Boardman River. Keystone was given a post office in 1883, upon the relocation of the post office from Beitner. The office lasted until 1894, until another post office, from Slights, relocated in 1901, lasting until 1908.
- Monroe Center is an unincorporated community located on the border with Green Lake Township at 44°36′48.9″N 85°41′47.4″W. Monroe Center was established by William and Pauline Monroe, who purchased 400 acres (160 ha) in the area in 1859, making it Blair Township's oldest settlement. A post office at Monroe Center lasted from 1866 until 1910.
- Slights (occasionally spelled Sleights, as is spelled on a nearby road) is a ghost town located at 44°39′28.2″N 85°35′36.9″W. Slights was founded as a station on the Chicago and West Michigan Railway south of Traverse City, near the Boardman River. A post office was open at Slights from 1893 until 1895, and briefly again in 1898.
- The downtown district of Traverse City lies about 6 miles (9.7 km) north of Blair Township.

== Demographics ==
As of the census of 2000, there were 6,448 people, 2,295 households, and 1,684 families residing in the township. The population density was 181.0 inhabitants per square mile (69.9/km^{2}). There were 2,482 housing units at an average density of 69.7 per square mile (26.9/km^{2}). The racial makeup of the township was 94.70% White, 0.25% African American, 1.64% Native American, 0.42% Asian, 0.02% Pacific Islander, 1.52% from other races, and 1.46% from two or more races. Hispanic or Latino of any race were 2.48% of the population.

There were 2,295 households, out of which 39.6% had children under the age of 18 living with them, 55.7% were married couples living together, 12.3% had a female householder with no husband present, and 26.6% were non-families. 18.5% of all households were made up of individuals, and 3.5% had someone living alone who was 65 years of age or older. The average household size was 2.80 and the average family size was 3.18.

In the township the population was spread out, with 30.1% under the age of 18, 8.9% from 18 to 24, 35.5% from 25 to 44, 19.0% from 45 to 64, and 6.6% who were 65 years of age or older. The median age was 32 years. For every 100 females, there were 102.0 males. For every 100 females age 18 and over, there were 99.1 males.

The median income for a household in the township was $40,125, and the median income for a family was $42,740. Males had a median income of $30,020 versus $19,885 for females. The per capita income for the township was $14,745. About 7.2% of families and 11.0% of the population were below the poverty line, including 11.4% of those under age 18 and 9.6% of those age 65 or over.

== Notable person ==
- Chasten Buttigieg, former first gentleman of South Bend, Indiana, and husband of United States Secretary of Transportation Pete Buttigieg, was raised in Chums Corner.
