= Arbutus Lake (Michigan) =

Lake in Grand Traverse County, Michigan

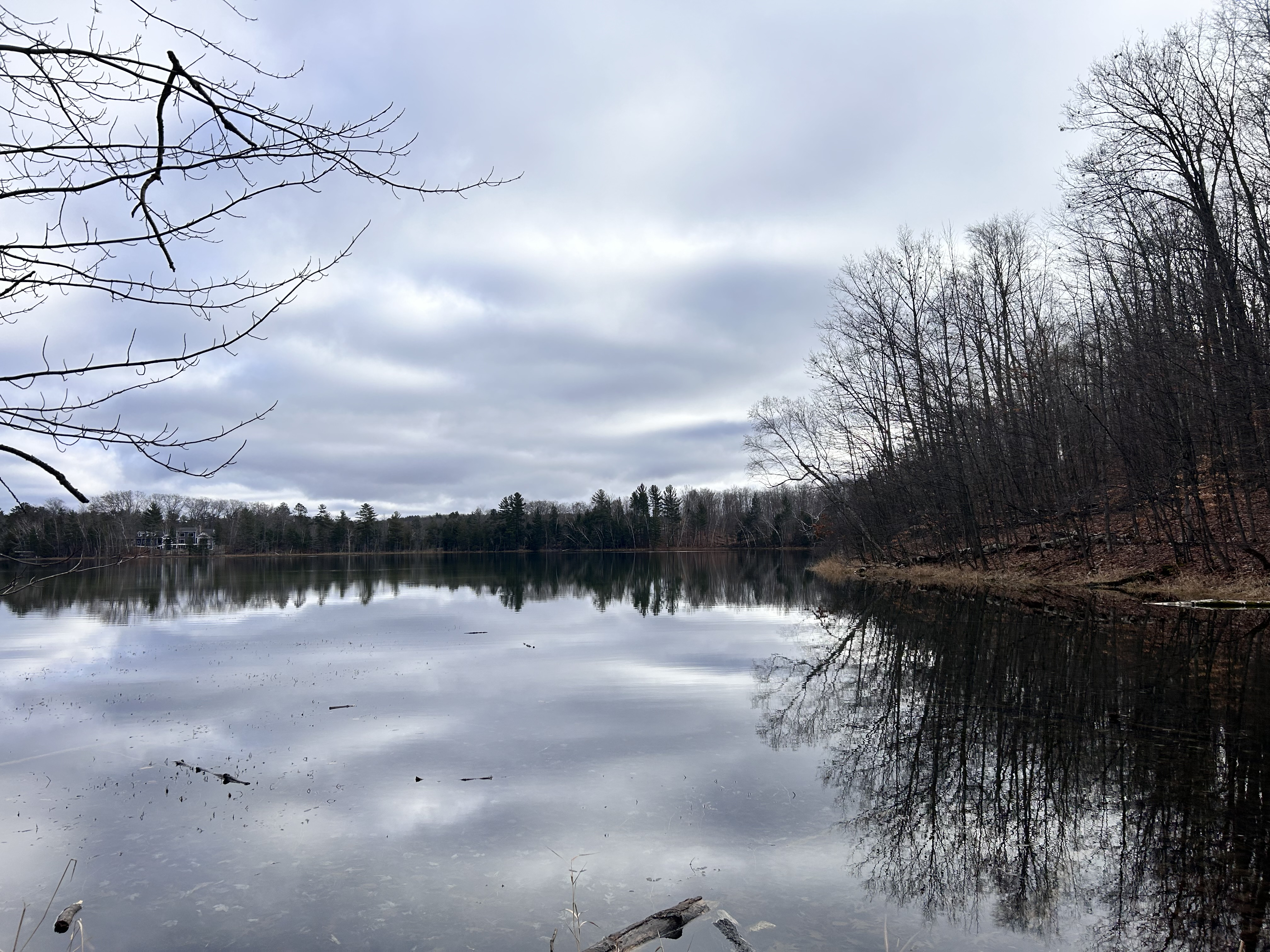
- View of Turtle Cove, an inlet of Arbutus Lake

- Location within Michigan
- Location: Grand Traverse County, Michigan (East Bay Township)
- Coordinates: 44.6526905°N 85.5197158°W
- Primary inflows: Arbutus Creek
- Primary outflows: Boardman River tributary
- Max. length: 2.02 m (6 ft 8 in)
- Max. width: 2,949 ft (899 m)
- Surface area: 395 acres (160 ha)
- Average depth: 23.4 ft (7.1 m)
- Max. depth: 44.0 ft (13.4 m)
- Surface elevation: 801 feet (244 m)
- Islands: Multiple Unnamed Islands
- Settlements: Forest Lakes

Arbutus Lake (/ˈɑːrbjuːtəs/ ar-BYOO-təs) is a lake in Grand Traverse County, Michigan. YMCA Camp Hayo-Went-Ha is located on the northeastern shore of the lake, and some of its common activities, such as rowing and fishing, take place on the lake.

The lake is composed of five smaller lakes, numbered Lakes 1, 2, 3, 4, and 5, ordered from south to north. Arbutus Lake, as well as the other Forest Lakes, is a part of the Boardman River watershed.
