= Traverse City State Park =

Park in Michigan, USA

Keith J. Charters Traverse City State Park
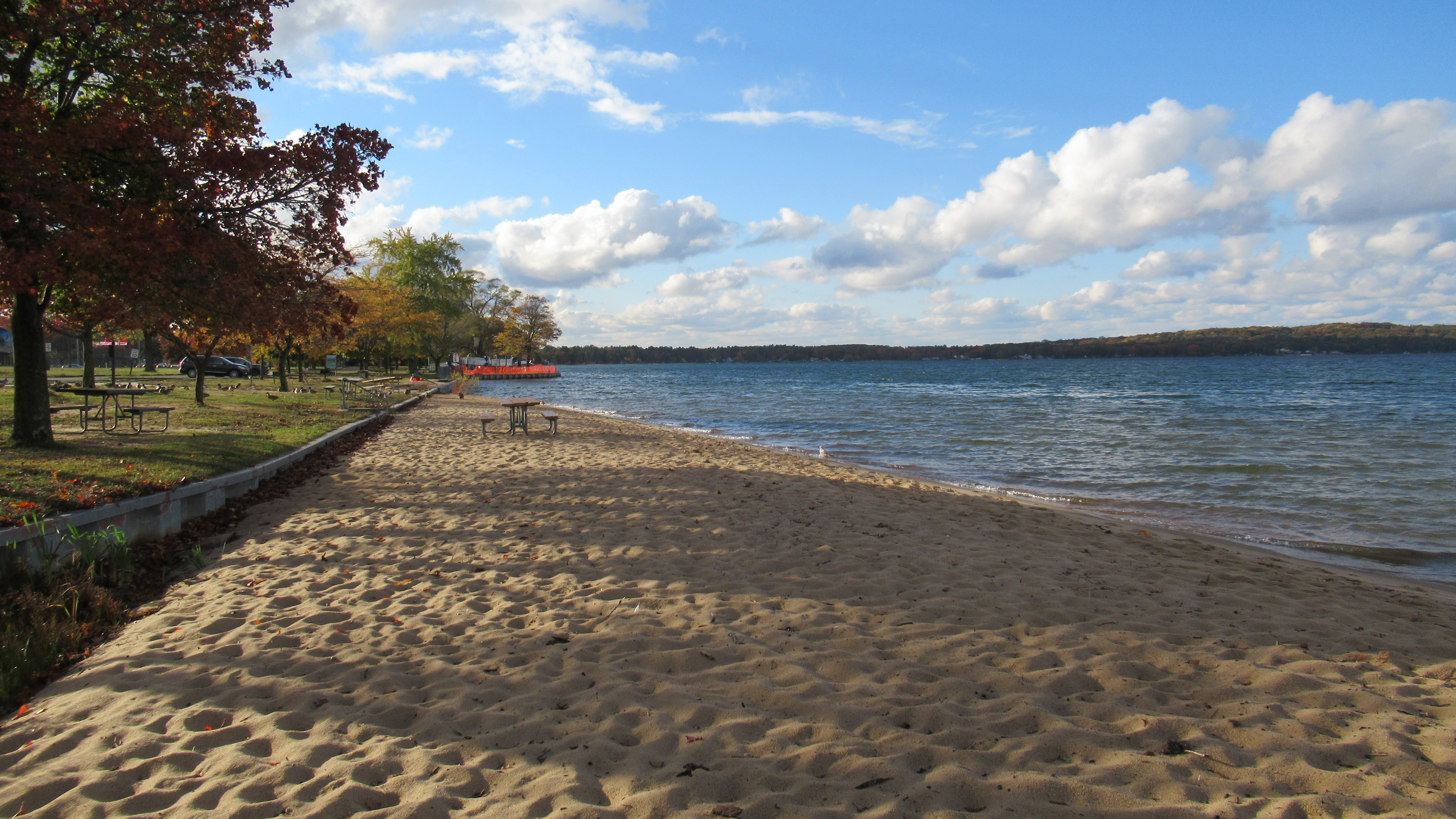
- Beachfront along Grand Traverse Bay

- Location within Michigan Location within the United States
- Location: East Bay Township, Grand Traverse County, Michigan
- Nearest city: Traverse City, Michigan
- Coordinates: 44°44′44″N 85°33′04″W
- Area: 75 acres (30 ha)
- Elevation: 591 feet (180 m)
- Established: 1920
- Administrator: Michigan Department of Natural Resources
- Designation: Michigan state park
- Website: Official website

Traverse City State Park, officially named Keith J. Charters Traverse City State Park, is a 75-acre (30 ha) public recreation area in East Bay Township just east of Traverse City in the U.S. state of Michigan.

The park is located on the southern shoreline of East Grand Traverse Bay, a bay of Lake Michigan, and is used mainly as a campground. US-31/M-72 runs between the park proper and a beach area; there is an overpass by way of which campers can get to the beach. The beach area has a playground, grills and picnic tables. The camping area has around 350 campsites, all with electricity. Other features include a dump and fill station, three bathroom buildings, and a recycling/trash center. To the south the park adjoins the TART Trail, a 10.5-mile bicycle trail that runs through Traverse City.

On July 21, 2011, the Michigan Natural Resources Commission augmented the name of the park with that of Keith J. Charters, a local conservationist, hunter and angler who served on the commission from 1994 to 2010.
