= Kids Creek =

Stream in Michigan, United States

Coordinates: 44°45′48″N 85°37′40″W

Kids Creek Mill Creek, Hospital Creek, Asylum Creek
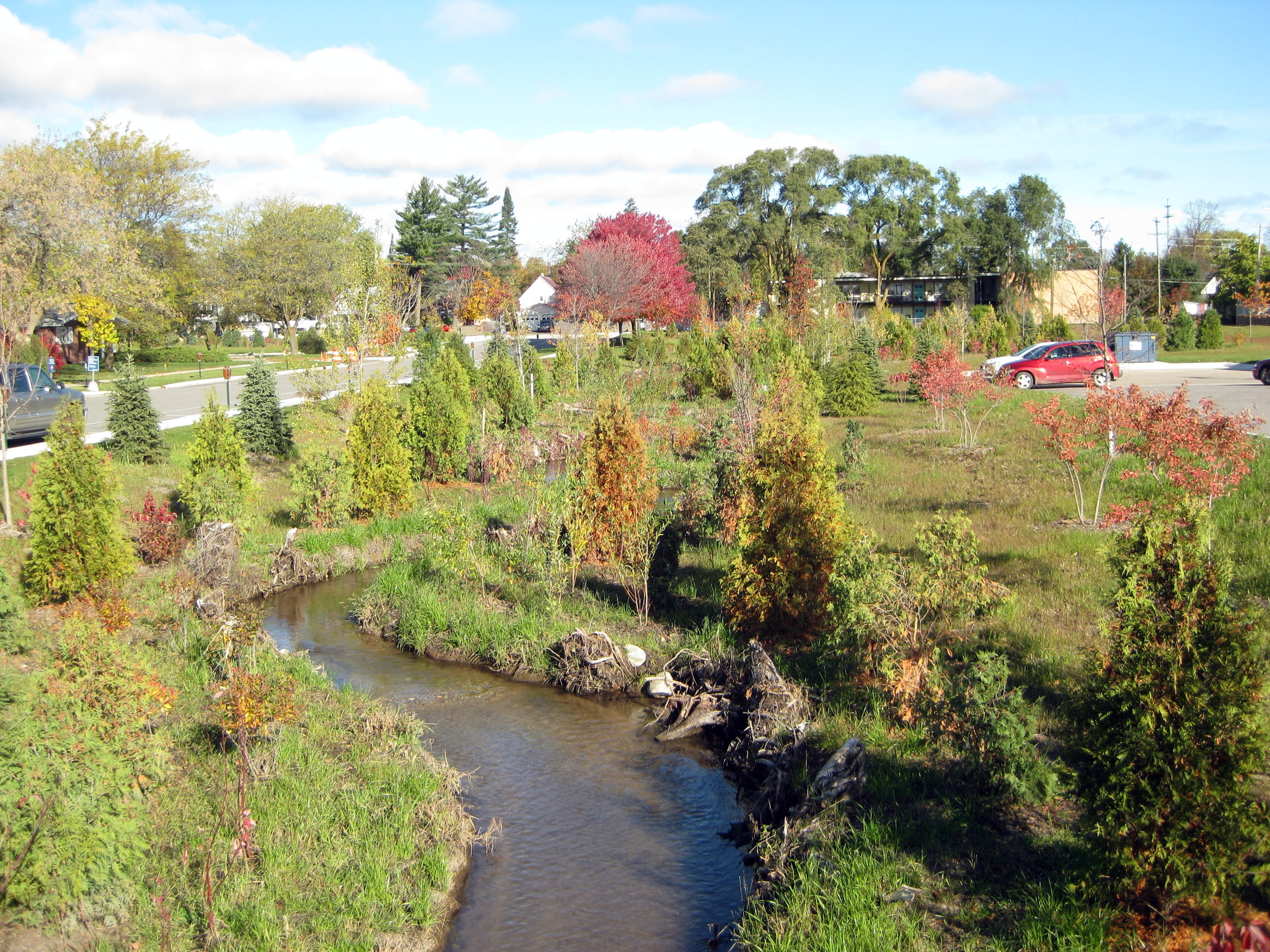
- Kids Creek flowing through the Munson Medical Center campus in Traverse City in 2013.

- Location of the mouth within Michigan

Location
- Country: United States
- State: Michigan
- County: Grand Traverse

Physical characteristics
- Source
  - location: Garfield Township, Grand Traverse County, Michigan
- Mouth
  - location: Boardman River in Traverse City
  - elevation: 584 ft (178 m)

Kids Creek is a stream in Grand Traverse County, Michigan in the United States. The stream is a tributary of the Boardman River, which itself flows into Grand Traverse Bay, a bay of Lake Michigan. The stream drains an area of about 7 square miles (18 km^{2}). The stream is so named because fishing in the stream was originally restricted to children. Previous names for the stream include Mill Creek, Hospital Creek, and Asylum Creek.

== Watercourse ==
The primary watercourse of Kids Creek, according to the GNIS, begins south of South Airport Road in Garfield Township, and flows northeasterly. The stream then crosses under highway US 31/M-37, and into a commercially developed area. The stream then turns northward, crossing once more under the highway, and passing a Meijer store. The stream then enters Traverse City, flowing north through the Grand Traverse Commons Natural Area, which is property that was previously operated as part of the Traverse City State Hospital. Crossing under Seventh Street, the stream enters the eponymous Kids Creek neighborhood of Traverse City. The stream turns east and crosses under West Front Street twice, before emptying into the Boardman River after flowing under Wadsworth Street.

== History ==
Early on, the stream was known as "Mill Creek", as a sawmill dammed the creek near Division Street in Traverse City.

=== Restoration efforts ===
In 2013, efforts to restore the portion of a Kids Creek Tributary A near Munson Medical Center were completed, which daylighted the stream and relocated its course from the west side of Beaumont Place to the east. Since then, a number of road crossing replacements in Traverse City's Kids Creek neighborhood have taken place, converting them from culverts to clear spans. These efforts have taken place to address the creek's decline in macroinvertebrate and fish habitats due to sediment, stormwater runoff, and impediments to flow.

In 2023, Meijer partnered with the Watershed Center Grand Traverse Bay to install underground infiltration structures and bioretention cells under the store's parking lot to further prevent stormwater runoff from entering the adjacent creek and marshland.
