= Turtle Creek Stadium =

Stadium in Blair Township, Michigan

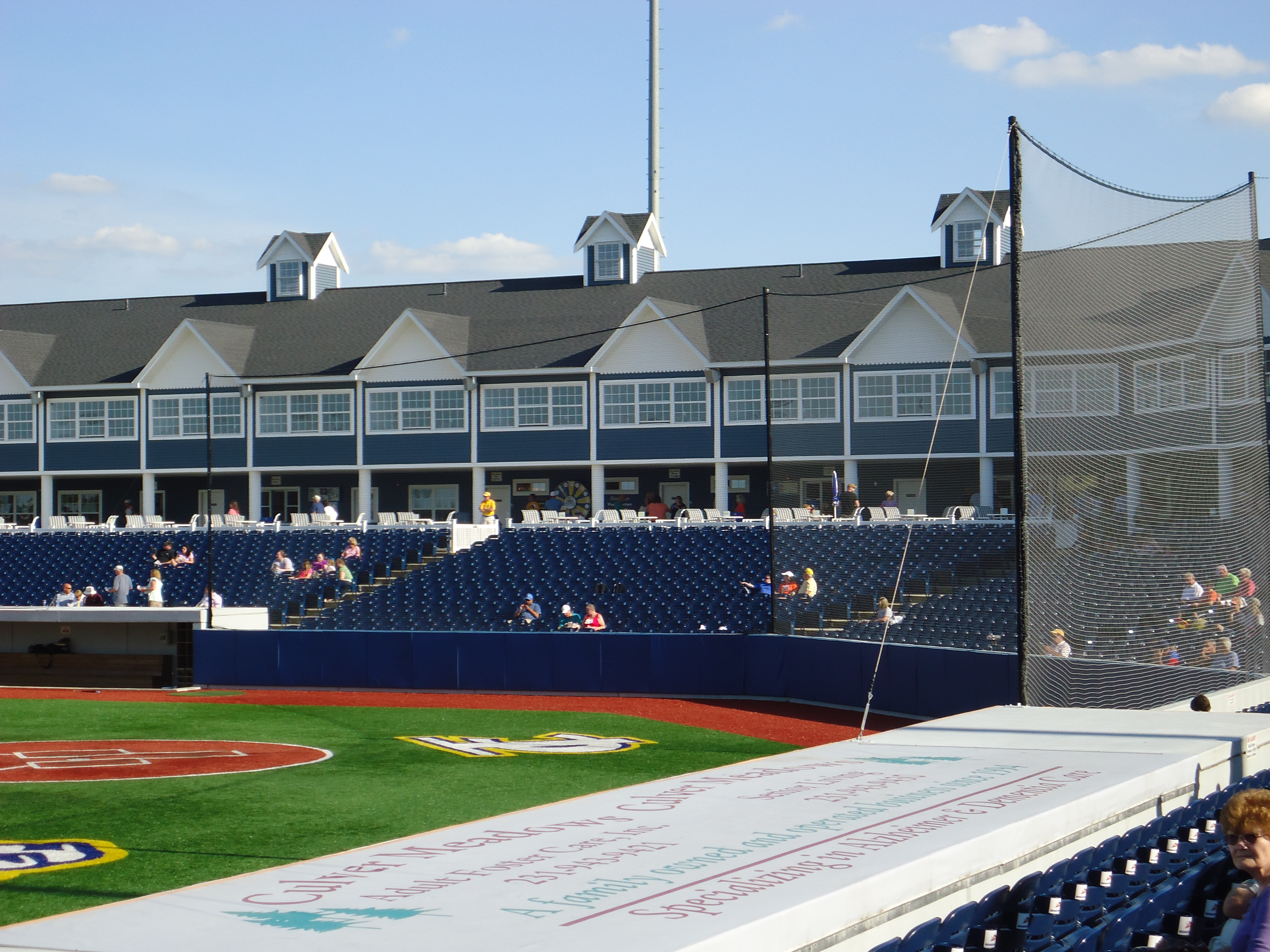

- Location within Michigan
- Former names: Wuerfel Park (2006–2019); Pit Spitters Park (2019)
- Location: 333 Stadium Drive; Traverse City, Michigan, United States
- Coordinates: 44.68173°N 85.660615°W
- Owner: Traverse City Baseball, LLC
- Capacity: 3,518; expandable to 4,200
- Field size: Left field: 320 ft (97.5 m); Left-center: 390 ft (118.9 m); Center field: 400 ft (121.9 m); Right-center: 390 ft (118.9 m); Right field: 320 ft (97.5 m)

Construction
- Groundbreaking: 2004
- Opened: May 24, 2006
- Cost: $6 million
- Architect: William C. Fuller

Tenants
- Traverse City Beach Bums (FL) 2006–2018; Traverse City Pit Spitters (NWL) 2019–present

Turtle Creek Stadium (formerly Pit Spitters Park and Wuerfel Park) is a 4,660-seat multi-use entertainment facility in Blair Township, Michigan, in the United States. It hosted its first regular season baseball game on May 24, 2006 as the tenants of the facility, the Traverse City Beach Bums, took on the Kalamazoo Kings. It was built as a new home for the Beach Bums baseball team, the first in Traverse City in 93 years. In 2018, the Beach Bums' owners retired and the park sold. In 2019, Wuerfel Park became home to Traverse City's new baseball team, the Traverse City Pit Spitters of the summer collegiate Northwoods League.

== History ==
The ballpark is located on a 26-acre (11 ha) site adjacent to the Chums Village commerce park, three miles (4.8 km) south of Traverse City near the intersection of US 31 and M-37. The groundbreaking for Wuerfel Park took place in late 2004 and was completed in time for the Beach Bums' inaugural 2006 season. The ballpark's façade resembles that of a resort hotel, a feature unique to baseball stadium architecture. John and Leslye Wuerfel, the original namesakes of the stadium and the owners of Wuerfel Resorts and the Beach Bums, designed Wuerfel Park to reference the region's resort industry and to their own type of business.

In 2018, the Traverse City Beach Bums and Weurfel Park were sold to a new ownership group led by the CEO of the West Michigan Whitecaps in Grand Rapids, Michigan. A new team, the Traverse City Pit Spitters, began playing at the park beginning in 2019, with the name changed to Pit Spitters Park with the sale.

In 2019, nearby Turtle Creek Casino purchased the naming rights for the park, changing the name to "Turtle Creek Stadium" for the 2020 season.

Events and tenants
Preceded by Champion Window Field	Host of the FL All-Star Game; Wuerfel Park; 2008	Succeeded by Road Ranger Stadium
