= Spider Lake (Grand Traverse County, Michigan) =

Lake in the state of Michigan, United States

Coordinates: 44°40′28″N 85°29′33″W

- Location within Michigan Location within the United States
- Location: Grand Traverse County, Michigan
- Type: Lake
- Primary outflows: Arbutus Creek
- Basin countries: United States
- Surface area: 450 acres (180 ha)
- Max. depth: 36 ft (11 m)
- Shore length^{1}: 29 mi (47 km)
- Surface elevation: 863 ft (263 m)
- Islands: Five unnamed islands
- ^{1} Shore length is not a well-defined measure.

Spider Lake is a 450-acre (180 ha) “all-sports” lake located about twenty minutes southeast of Downtown Traverse City in Grand Traverse County, Michigan. It is part of the Boardman River watershed.

Spider Lake teems with bass, bluegill, perch, pike, and crappie contained within 29 miles (47 km) of shoreline. There are several vacation rentals and small resorts all around the lake as well as jet-ski rentals and many other water sports.

== See also ==
- List of lakes in Michigan
