= American Legion Memorial Bridge (Michigan) =

Historic bridge in Traverse City, Michigan, United States

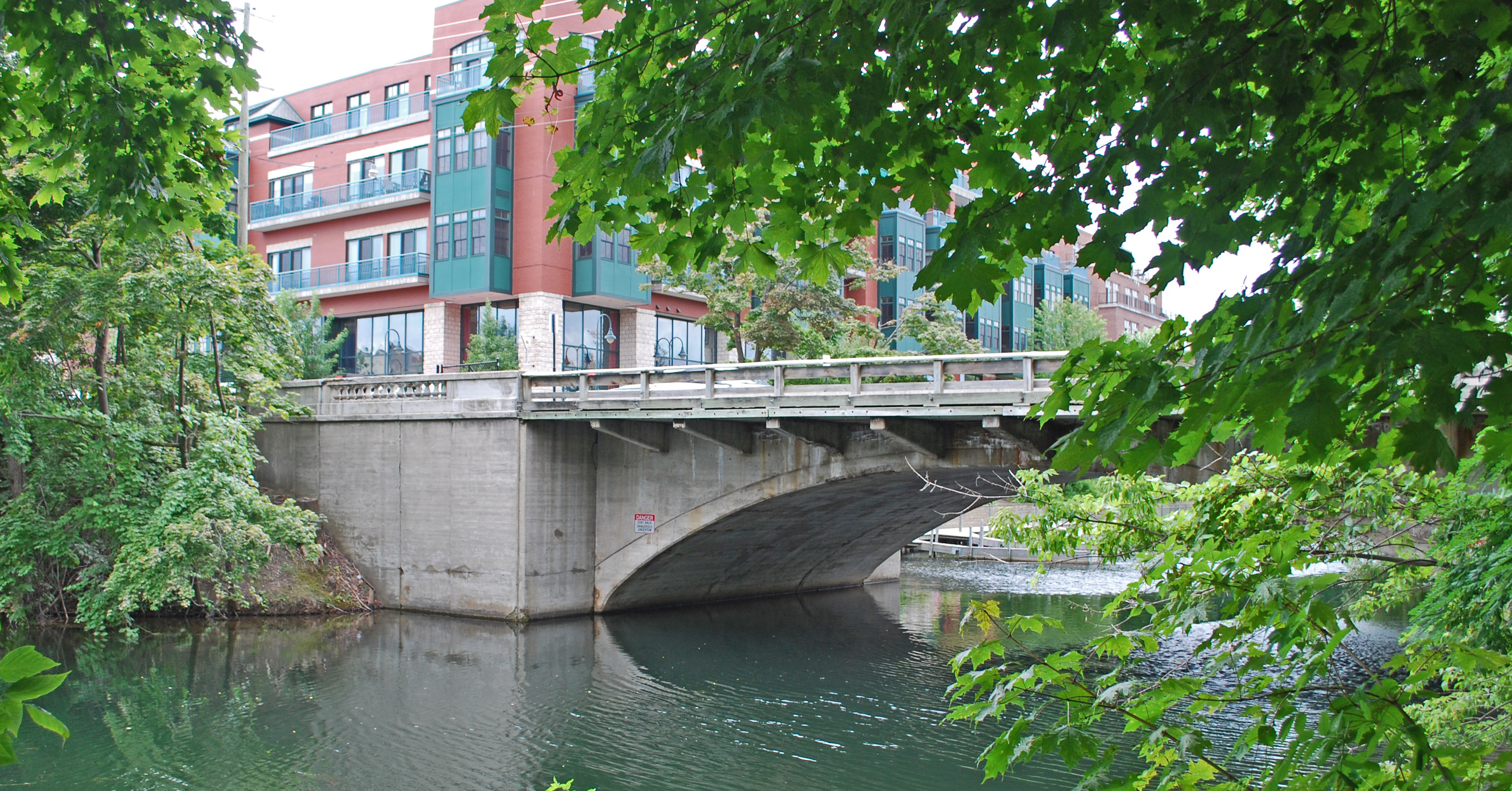
- Coordinates: 44°45′40″N 85°37′16″W
- Carries: S. Cass St.
- Crosses: Boardman River
- Locale: Traverse City, Michigan

Characteristics
- Design: reinforced concrete arch

History
- Opened: 1930

Statistics
- Toll: None
- American Legion Memorial Bridge
- U.S. National Register of Historic Places
- Area: less than one acre
- Built: 1930
- Built by: Aldrich & Cook, Jerome Wilhelm
- Architect: Daniel B. Luten
- Architectural style: Concrete arch bridge
- MPS: Highway Bridges of Michigan MPS
- NRHP reference No.: 99001650
- Added to NRHP: January 7, 2000

Location
- Interactive map of American Legion Memorial Bridge

The American Legion Memorial Bridge, also known as the South Cass Street Bridge, is a reinforced concrete arch bridge carrying South Cass Street over the Boardman River in Traverse City, Michigan. It was completed in 1930 and listed on the National Register of Historic Places in 2000.

== History ==
In 1929 the city commission called for a public referendum to decide if the city should build bridges over the Boardman River at South Union and South Cass Streets. The referendum passed, and at the same time the state agreed to build the Union Street Bridge. The city commission hired Indianapolis bridge engineer Daniel B. Luten to design the bridge at South Cass. The firms of Aldrich & Cook and Jerome Wilhelm were hired to build the bridge, which was completed in 1930. Dedication plaques were purchased during construction at the request of the American Legion.

At some point, the original handrails were removed and jersey barricades were added, detracting somewhat from the original design. However, the bridge is still in use. In 2021/22, the bridge underwent extensive renovation, including a removal and replacement of the bridge and the installation of a decorative pedestrian railing.

== Description ==
The American Legion Memorial Bridge is 68 feet (21 m) long and 58.5 feet (17.8 m) wide, with a roadway width of 40 feet (12 m). The span is formed by a barrel-vaulted elliptical arch. Sidewalks, supported by concrete brackets, overhang the face of the arch. The original balustrade railings on the bridge have been replaced with planks, but the approaches still contain the original solid-concrete parapets and concrete balustrades with urn-shaped spindles. A plate on one parapet reads: "American Legion Memorial Bridge 1930."
