= Garfield Township, Grand Traverse County, Michigan =

Garfield Township, Michigan
- Charter township
- Charter Township of Garfield
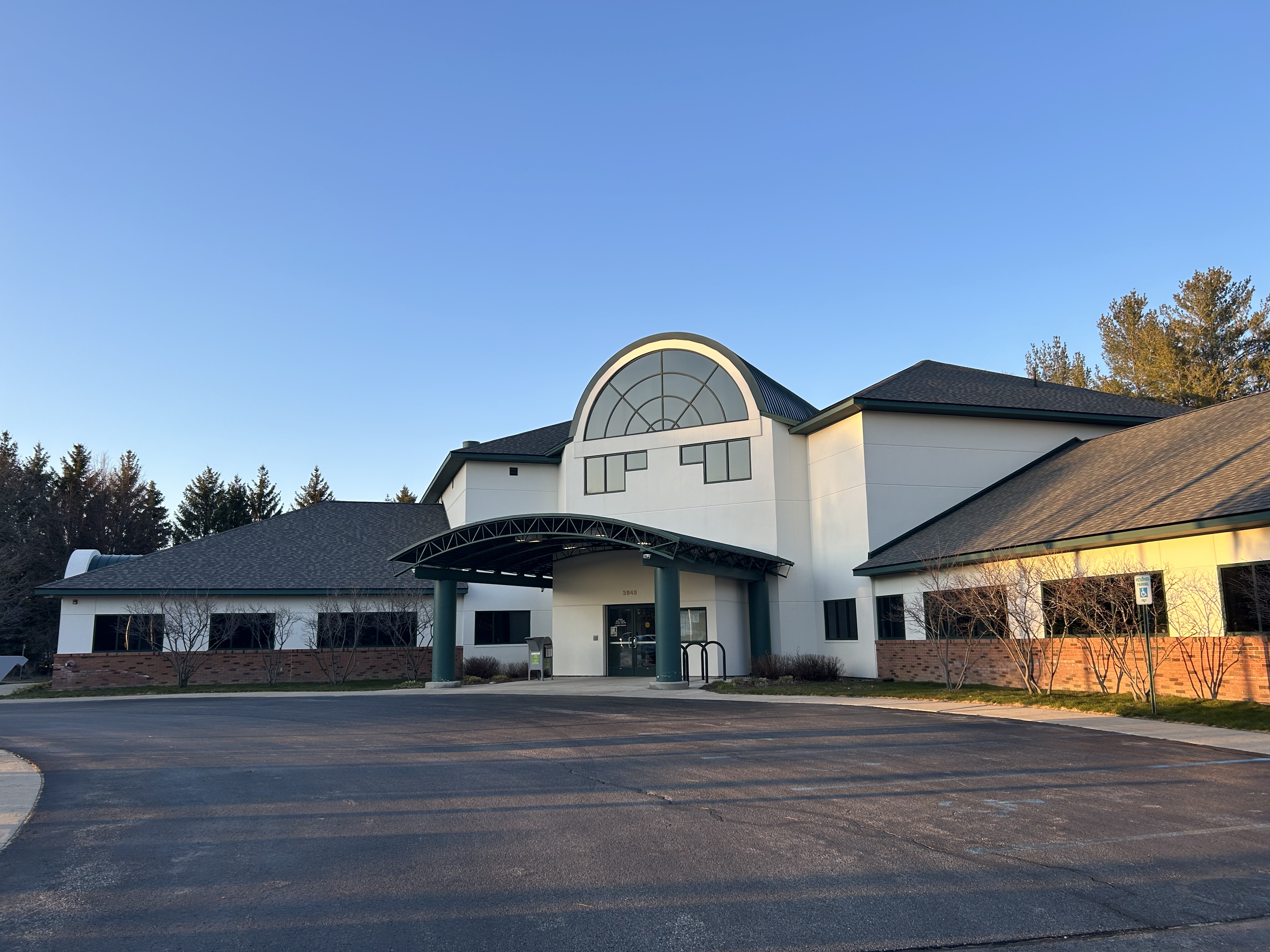
- Garfield Township Hall near Traverse City

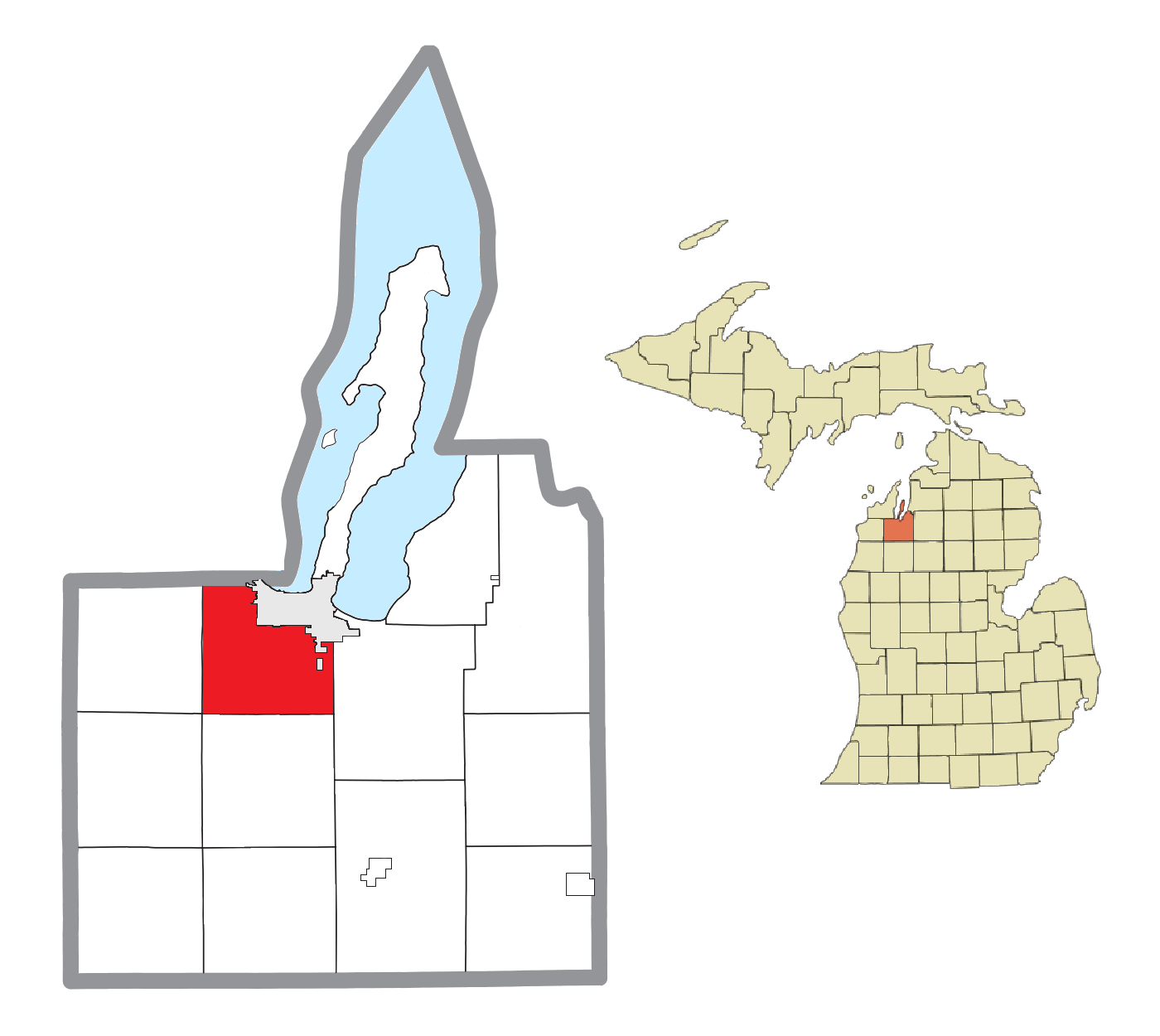
- Location within Grand Traverse County

- Location within the state of Michigan
- Coordinates: 44°43′17″N 85°38′28″W
- Country: United States
- State: Michigan
- County: Grand Traverse
- Organized: 1853 (Traverse Township)
- Renamed: 1882
- Named for: James A. Garfield

Government
  - Supervisor: Joe McManus
  - Clerk: Lanie McManus

Area
  - Total: 27.7 sq mi (71.7 km^{2})
  - Land: 26.7 sq mi (69.1 km^{2})
  - Water: 0.97 sq mi (2.5 km^{2})
- Elevation: 702 ft (214 m)

Population (2020)
  - Total: 19,499
  - Estimate (2025): 19,698
  - Density: 730/sq mi (282/km^{2})
- Time zone: UTC-5 (Eastern (EST))
  - Summer (DST): UTC-4 (EDT)
- ZIP code(s): 49684, 49685, 49686, 49696 (Traverse City)
- Area code: 231
- FIPS code: 26-31580
- GNIS feature ID: 1626337
- Website: https://www.garfieldmi.gov/

Garfield Township, officially the Charter Township of Garfield, is a charter township of Grand Traverse County in the U.S. state of Michigan. As of the 2020 census, the township had a total population of 19,499.

Garfield Township is the largest municipality in Northern Lower Michigan by population. Much of the township is suburban, due to its proximity to Traverse City. It is one of four charter townships in the Traverse City metropolitan area; the others being Elmwood Township in Leelanau County, and East Bay and Long Lake townships in Grand Traverse County.

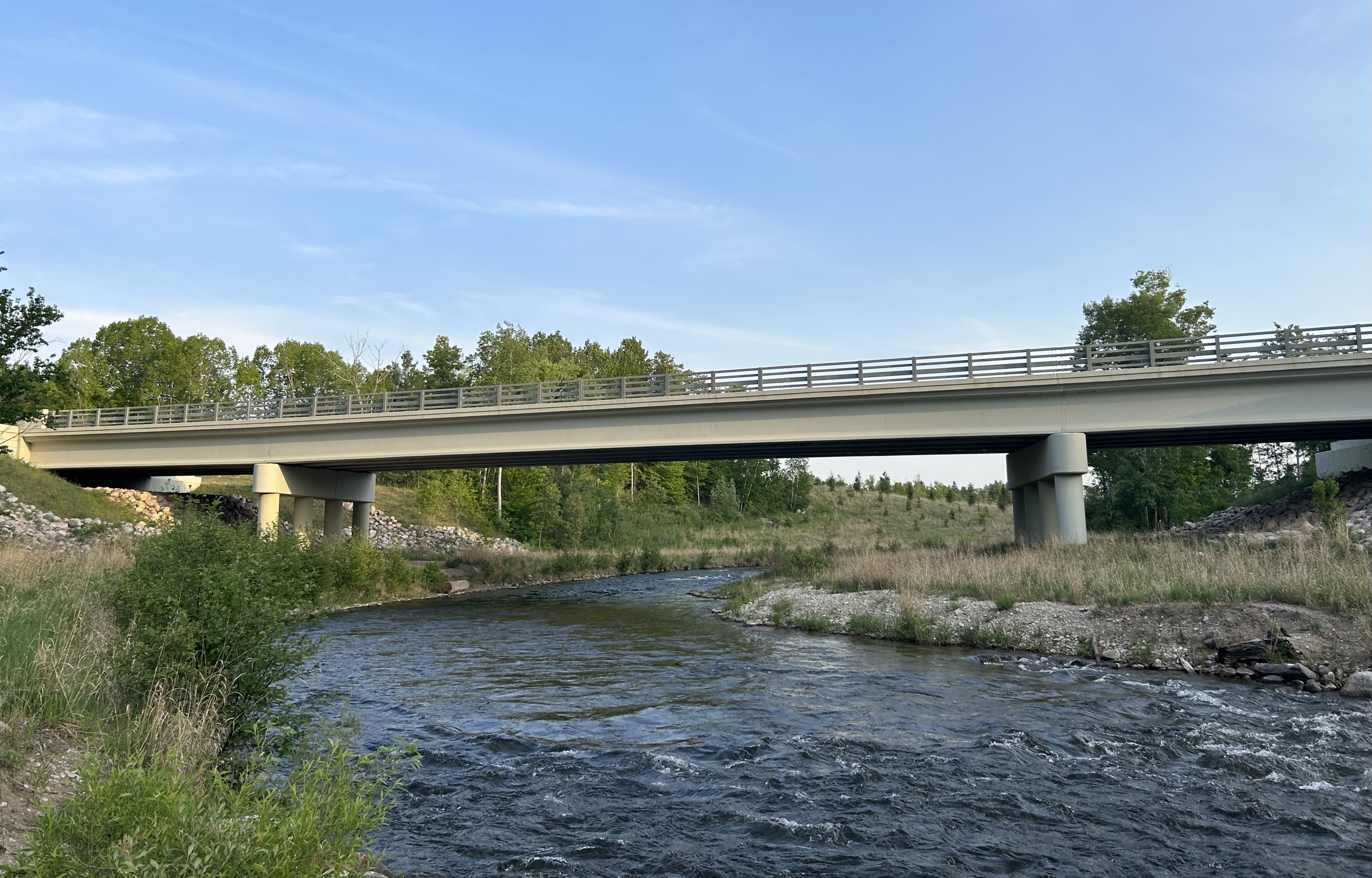
Robbins Bridge, which carries Cass Road over the Boardman–Ottaway River in Garfield Township. The bridge was constructed in 2016.

== History ==
The first two townships of Grand Traverse County were organized in 1853; the Old Mission Peninsula was assigned to Peninsula Township, with its present-day boundaries, and the rest of the county, including Traverse City, was assigned to Traverse Township. However, it was renamed in 1882 in honor of recently assassinated president James A. Garfield. In 1977, Garfield Township became a charter township.

== Geography ==
According to the United States Census Bureau, the township has a total area of 27.7 square miles (72 km^{2}), of which 26.7 square miles (69 km^{2}) is land and 1.0 square mile (2.6 km^{2}) (3.54%) is water.

The Boardman River flows from south to north in the east of the township. Kids Creek, a south to north stream, also flows through the township. The township's largest lake, Silver Lake is in the southwest of the township, and is shared to the south with Blair Township.

Two lines of the Great Lakes Central Railroad run through the east of the township, paralleling the Boardman River on either side.

=== Adjacent municipalities ===
All townships listed are part of Grand Traverse County, unless otherwise stated.

- Elmwood Charter Township, Leelanau County (north)
- Traverse City (northeast)
- East Bay Charter Township (east)
- Blair Township (south)
- Green Lake Township (southwest)
- Long Lake Charter Township (west)

== Transportation ==
=== Major highways ===
- US 31 is a major north–south route in Michigan's Lower Peninsula that roughly parallels the shore of Lake Michigan. South of Grand Traverse County, US 31 runs through the cities of Muskegon, Grand Haven, Holland, and Benton Harbor. Within Garfield Township, the route is highly commercialized.
- M-37 shares a concurrency with US 31 throughout its entire length within Garfield Township. South of Grand Traverse County, M-37 follows a north–south route further inland than US 31, and runs through the cities of Grand Rapids and Battle Creek.
- M-72 is an east–west highway in the northern part of the township, largely forming the border between Grand Traverse and Leelanau counties. The highway is considered trans-peninsular, running across the Lower Peninsula from Lake Michigan at Empire to Lake Huron at Harrisville. East of Traverse City, M-72 runs through the communities of Kalkaska, Grayling, and Mio.

=== Bus Service ===
- The Bay Area Transportation Authority (BATA) services Garfield Township and the larger Traverse City metropolitan area. There are currently 3 routes offered which connect Grand Traverse and Leelanau counties: the City Loop, Bayline, and Village Loop.

=== Air service ===
- Cherry Capital Airport is immediately adjacent Garfield Township within the city of Traverse City. The airport offers year-round service to destinations such as Detroit, Chicago O'Hare, and Charlotte.

== Communities ==
- Brookside (44°44′32″N 85°38′48.28″W) is a small community outside Traverse City.
- Kratochvil's Plat is a former resort community on the northwestern shore of Silver Lake. It was located at 44°42′41.3″N 85°41′20″W.
- The city of Traverse City is immediately adjacent Garfield Township (to the northeast), and, prior to incorporation, was part of Garfield Township.

== Demographics ==
Historical population
Census	Pop.	Note	%±
1900	986		—
1910	932		−5.5%
1920	726		−22.1%
1930	696		−4.1%
1940	970		39.4%
1950	1,676		72.8%
1960	2,595		54.8%
1970	4,917		89.5%
1980	8,747		77.9%
1990	10,516		20.2%
2000	13,840		31.6%
2010	16,256		17.5%
2020	19,499		19.9%
2025 (est.)	19,698	▲	1.0%
U.S. Decennial Census

As of the census of 2010, there were 16,256 people, 7,367 households, and 4,040 families residing in the township. The population density was 609 per square mile (235/km^{2}). There were 8,194 housing units at an average density of 307 per square mile (119/km^{2}). The racial makeup of the township was 93.87% White, 0.80% African American, 1.18% Native American, 1.06% Asian, 0.04% Pacific Islander, 0.67% from other races, and 2.37% from two or more races. Hispanic or Latino of any race were 2.45% of the population.

There were 7,367 households, out of which 22.3% had children under the age of 18 living with them, 40.8% were married couples living together, 10.8% had a female householder with no husband present, and 45.2% were non-families. 37.5% of all households were made up of individuals, and 17.6% had someone living alone who was 65 years of age or older. The average household size was 2.16 and the average family size was 2.83.

In the township the population was spread out, with 20.1% under the age of 18, 9.1% from 18 to 24, 23.1% from 25 to 44, 27.3% from 45 to 64, and 20.4% who were 65 years of age or older. The median age was 43 years. For every 100 females, there were 84.4 males. For every 100 females age 18 and over, there were 80.7 males.

The median income for a household in the township was $41,712, and the median income for a family was $55,977. Males had a median income of $30,167 versus $23,672 for females. The per capita income for the township was $26,390. About 10.1% of families and 14.3% of the population were below the poverty line, including 20.9% of those under age 18 and 5.6% of those age 65 or over.

== Education ==
Traverse City Area Public Schools (TCAPS) serves the entirety of Garfield Township. Secondary students within the east of the township are zoned to Traverse City Central High School, while secondary students within the west of the township are zoned to Traverse City West Senior High School. The latter is located within Garfield Township. TCAPS also operates Traverse City West Middle School and Silver Lake Elementary School within the township.
