= Boardman River =

River in Michigan, United States

Boardman River Ottaway River, Boardman–Ottaway River
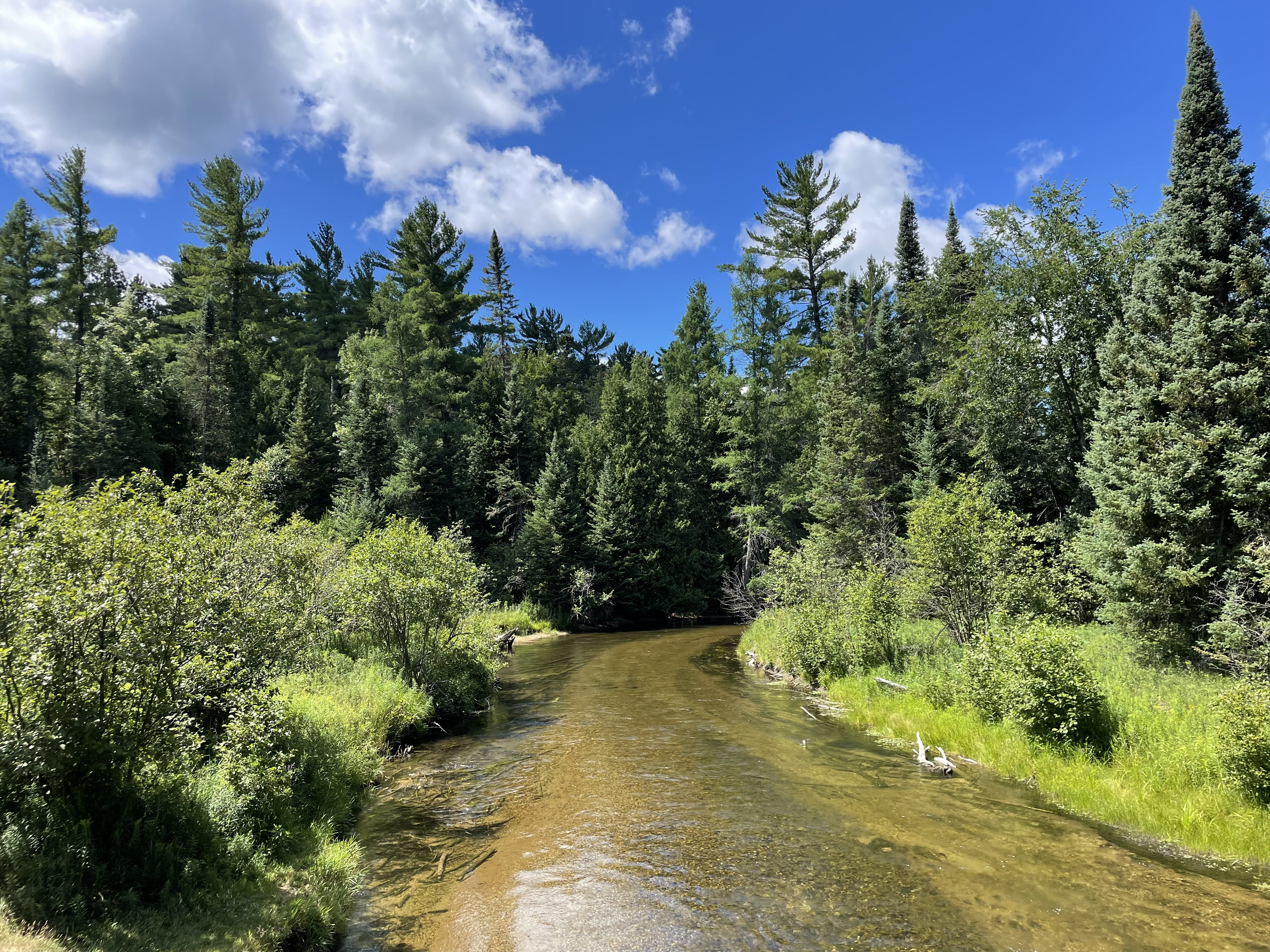
- The Boardman River from a pedestrian bridge near Kingsley, Michigan
- Native name: Adaawewiziibi (Ojibwe)

Location
- Country: United States
- State: Michigan
- Cities: Traverse City, South Boardman, Kalkaska

Physical characteristics
- Source
  - location: Union Township, Grand Traverse County: Confluence of North & South Branches, Michigan
- Mouth
  - location: Grand Traverse Bay West Arm (Lake Michigan) in Traverse City
- Length: 28 mi (45 km)

Basin features
- Progression: Boardman River → Grand Traverse Bay → Lake Michigan → Lake Huron
- Tributaries
  - left: Kids Creek, Beitner Creek, Swainston Creek, Carpenter Creek, South Branch
  - right: North Branch

The Boardman River (/bɔːrdmən/ BORD-mən), also known as the Ottaway River (/ɒtəweɪ/ AH-tə-way) or the Boardman–Ottaway River, is a 28.2-mile-long (45.4 km) river in the northwestern Lower Peninsula of Michigan. It rises in western Kalkaska County, and flows west and north through Grand Traverse County to Grand Traverse Bay, a bay of Lake Michigan, in downtown Traverse City. The river's watershed drains an area of 295 square miles (760 km^{2}) through a combined 130 miles (210 km) of river and tributaries. Additionally, the Boardman River is considered one of the top ten trout streams in Michigan.

== History ==
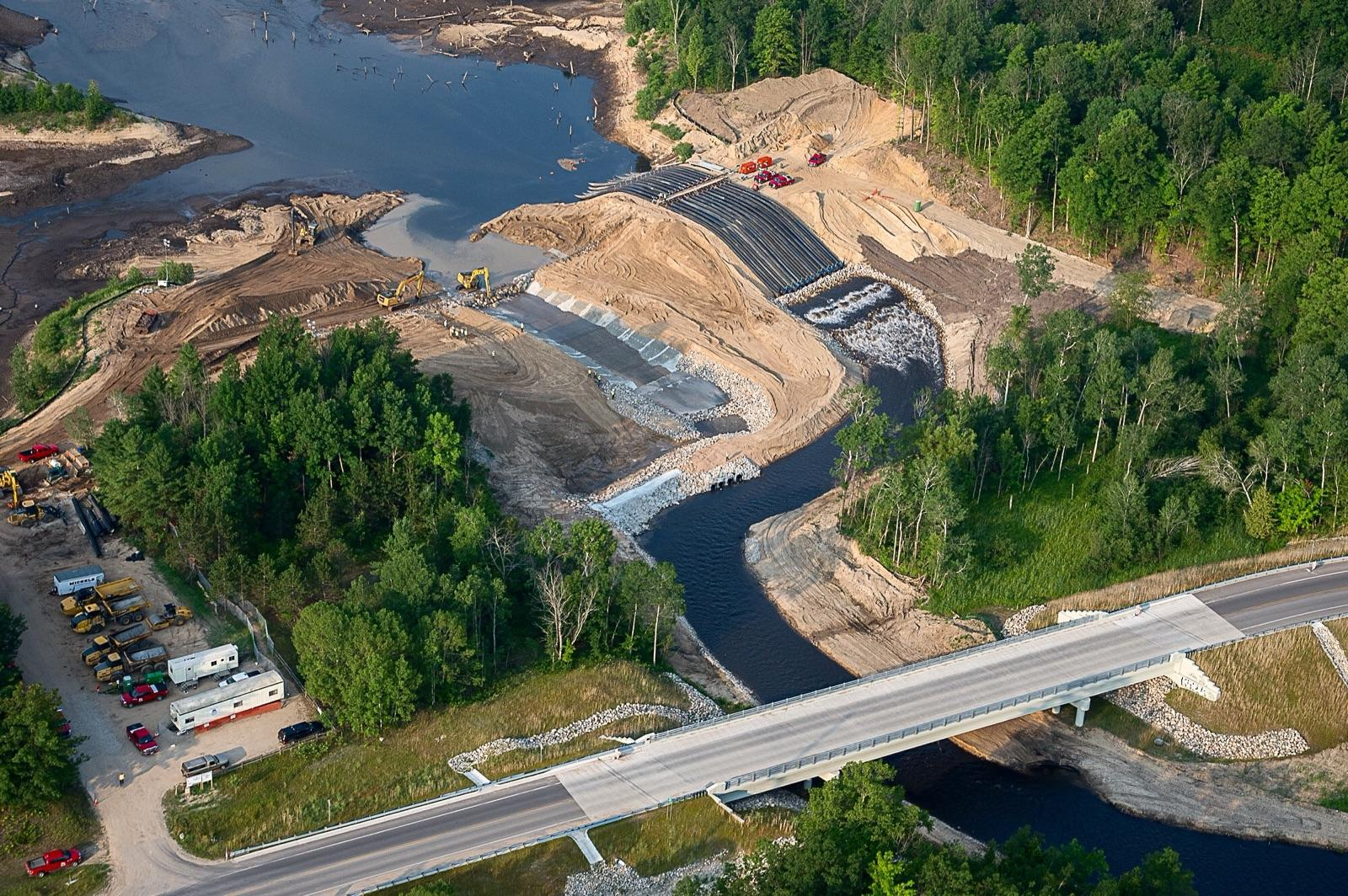
Siphoning operations draining the reservoir behind Boardman Dam in July 2017; this operation realigned the watercourse under the Robbins Bridge (foreground).

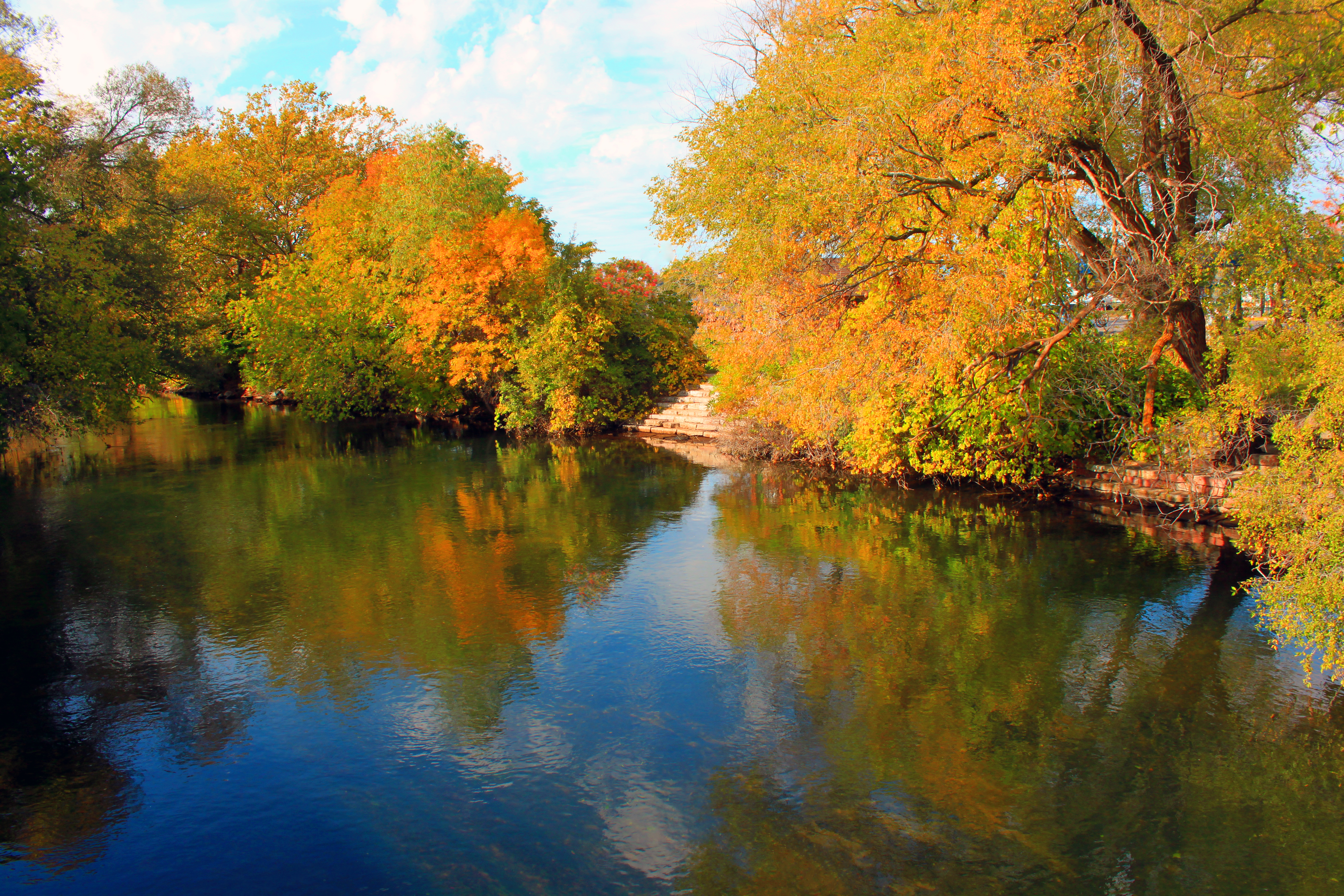
The Boardman River in downtown Traverse City along the Sara Hardy Farmer's Market, 2015

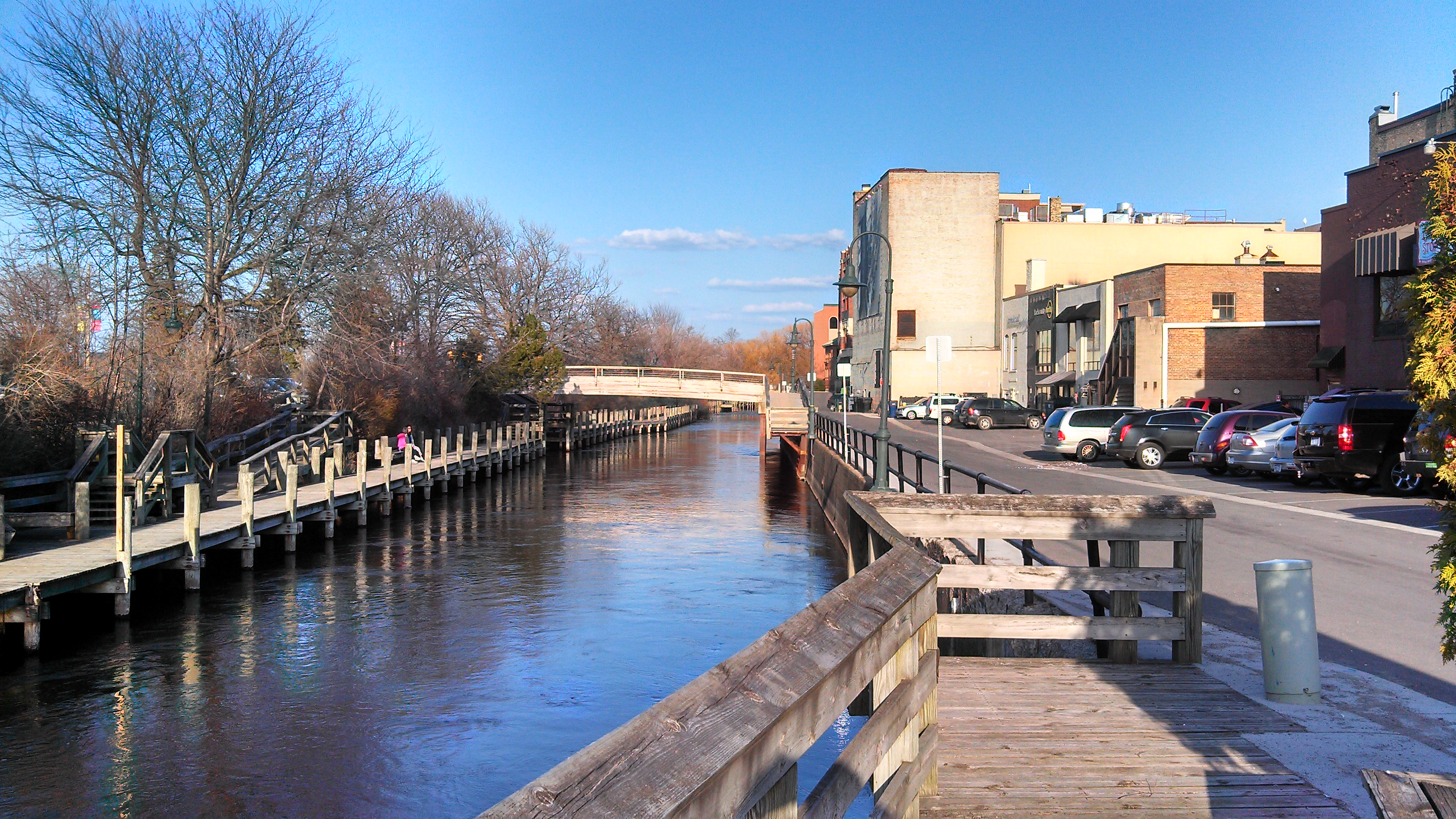
The Boardman River near its mouth in downtown Traverse City; the land on the banks of the river in this location is urbanized, including some public greenspace.

Prior to European settlement, the river was known as adaawewiziibi, roughly translating from Ojibwe as "river of trade".

In the year 1847, Captain Horace Boardman of Naperville, Illinois, purchased land at the head of Grand Traverse Bay, at a river then known as the Ottaway River. With the arrival of Hannah-Lay in the 1850s, the river was colloquially, and later officially, renamed the Boardman River. Recent movements have sought to change the name of the river to its original name, either in full or abbreviated (i.e. Boardman–Ottaway River)

Later in 1800s, as Traverse City was first being settled, the Union Street Dam was built by the Hannah-Lay Company as a saw mill in 1867. Around this time, citizens were dumping sewage into the Boardman, which was causing severe health problems. The lake became very industrialized. The western shore of the lake was used for a log rollaway and rail yard on the Great Lakes Central Railroad, used as such until the early 2000s.

=== Restoration ===
Between 1867 and 1922, five dams were built along the main course of the Boardman River. In upstream order, they are: the Union Street Dam, Sabin Dam, Boardman Dam, Keystone Dam, and Brown Bridge Dam. In 1961, the Keystone Dam was washed out after flooding upstream, and was not replaced.

On October 6, 2012, while preparing to demolish Brown Bridge Dam, the highest on the river and largest in terms of impoundment, a temporary structure put in place to facilitate drawdown at the dam was breached, flooding the river valley. In June 2014 the Michigan DEQ issued a report identifying erosion around the temporary drawdown structure as the likely cause of the failure. Brown Bridge Dam removal was completed in January 2013 and resulted in the reestablishment of 2.5 miles of river channel.

In 2017, Boardman Dam and its impoundment structure were demolished, along with an adjacent one-lane bridge carrying Cass Road over the river. A new bridge for Cass Road over the new future river channel was completed the previous year. With the removal of this dam, the watercourse was realigned under the new bridge for the first time. The new bridge was named Robbins Bridge, after Jack Robbins, a local resident who had lived along the river for 85 years. Immediately upstream, Sabin Dam was fully removed by the end of 2018, and a pedestrian bridge was built in its place in 2025.

In 2024, a restoration project on the section of the Boardman River between Cass and Union Streets south of downtown Traverse City began, known as FishPass. The project includes the removal of the Union Street Dam, the final impoundment on the main course of the river (which was completed in 2025), and the construction of a weir and technologically innovative fish ladder. The project is expected to be complete in 2027.

=== 2026 flooding event ===
On April 14, 2026, after excessive rainfall and heavy snowmelt around Northern Michigan, the Boardman River crested at 8.0 feet (2.4 m) and 7.8 feet (2.4 m) near Mayfield and at Beitner Road, respectively, setting new records at both locations. The Beitner Road crossing itself, a pair of culverts, were washed out by the river, and further downstream, the river flooded Medalie Park and crested over the South Airport Road crossing, causing that roadway to be shut down. Floodwater also impacted downtown Traverse City, causing sinkholes to form near embankment walls, a retaining wall to fail at the FishPass construction site, and the closure of numerous boardwalks and parks along the river. As a result, a state of emergency was declared for Grand Traverse County. On November 18, 2026, the Beitner Road crossing reopened as a bridge.

== Course ==
The Boardman River follows a rather unusually-shaped course. The river rises from streams and swamps in central and western Kalkaska County, flowing generally west–southwest and west before reaching Blair Township in Grand Traverse County, where the river turns due north, and flows into Boardman Lake in Garfield Township. Upon exiting Boardman Lake, water flows northwesterly, before turning back due east, forming a U-shape around downtown Traverse City, collecting Kids Creek along the way. The river then angles northeast, finally entering the west arm of Grand Traverse Bay.

Boardman Lake is a natural body of water (which would exist even without impoundment by the Union Street Dam) along the lower course of the river, about a mile upstream from the river's mouth at Grand Traverse Bay. The lake is located within Traverse City and Garfield Township. This lake is also a popular recreational and fishing lake. It has an abundance of bluegill, largemouth bass, northern pike, smallmouth bass, sunfish, walleye, and yellow perch.

== Crossings ==
The following road bridges lay on the main course of the river, entirely within Grand Traverse County.

Name	Route	Type	City	Location
Murchie Bridge	US 31/M-37/M-72 (Grandview Parkway)	State highway	Traverse City	44°45′53″N 85°36′46.7″W
Park Street Bridge	Park Street	City street	Traverse City	44°45′52.5″N 85°37′05.6″W
North Cass Street Bridge	Cass Street	City street	Traverse City	44°45′53.1″N 85°37′15.8″W
North Union Street Bridge	Union Street	City street	Traverse City	44°45′53.7″N 85°37′25.9″W
West Front Street Bridge	West Front Street	City street	Traverse City	44°45′50.6″N 85°37′38.8″W
Trunk Line Bridge	Union Street	City street	Traverse City	44°45′43.3″N 85°37′25.8″W
American Legion Memorial Bridge	Cass Street	City street	Traverse City	44°45′41″N 85°37′15.7″W
East Eighth Street Bridge	East Eighth Street	City street	Traverse City	44°45′33.9″N 85°36′59.7″W
South Airport Road North Culverts	South Airport Road (westbound)	County road	Garfield Township	44°44′00.7″N 85°36′59.8″W
South Airport Road South Culverts	South Airport Road (eastbound)	County road	Garfield Township	44°43′59.7″N 85°36′59.8″W
Robbins Bridge	Cass Road	County road	Garfield Township	44°41′55.3″N 85°37′24″W
Beitner Road Bridge	Beitner Road	County road	Blair Township	44°40′29.7″N 85°37′50.5″W
River Road West Bridge	River Road	County road	East Bay Township	44°38′49.2″N 85°37′50.5″W
River Road East Bridge	River Road	County road	East Bay Township	44°38′39.9″N 85°32′08.8″W
Garfield Road Bridge	Garfield Road	County road	Paradise Township	44°38′13.1″N 85°31′05.6″W
Brown Bridge Road West Bridge	Brown Bridge Road	County road	Paradise Township	44°38′32.2″N 85°30′54.7″W
Brown Bridge Road Middle Bridge	Brown Bridge Road	County road	Union Township	44°39′06.1″N 85°27′18.7″W
Brown Bridge Road East Bridge	Brown Bridge Road	County road	Union Township	44°39′24.5″N 85°26′18.6″W
Supply Road Bridge	Supply Road	County road	Union Township	44°40′29″N 85°23′45.7″W

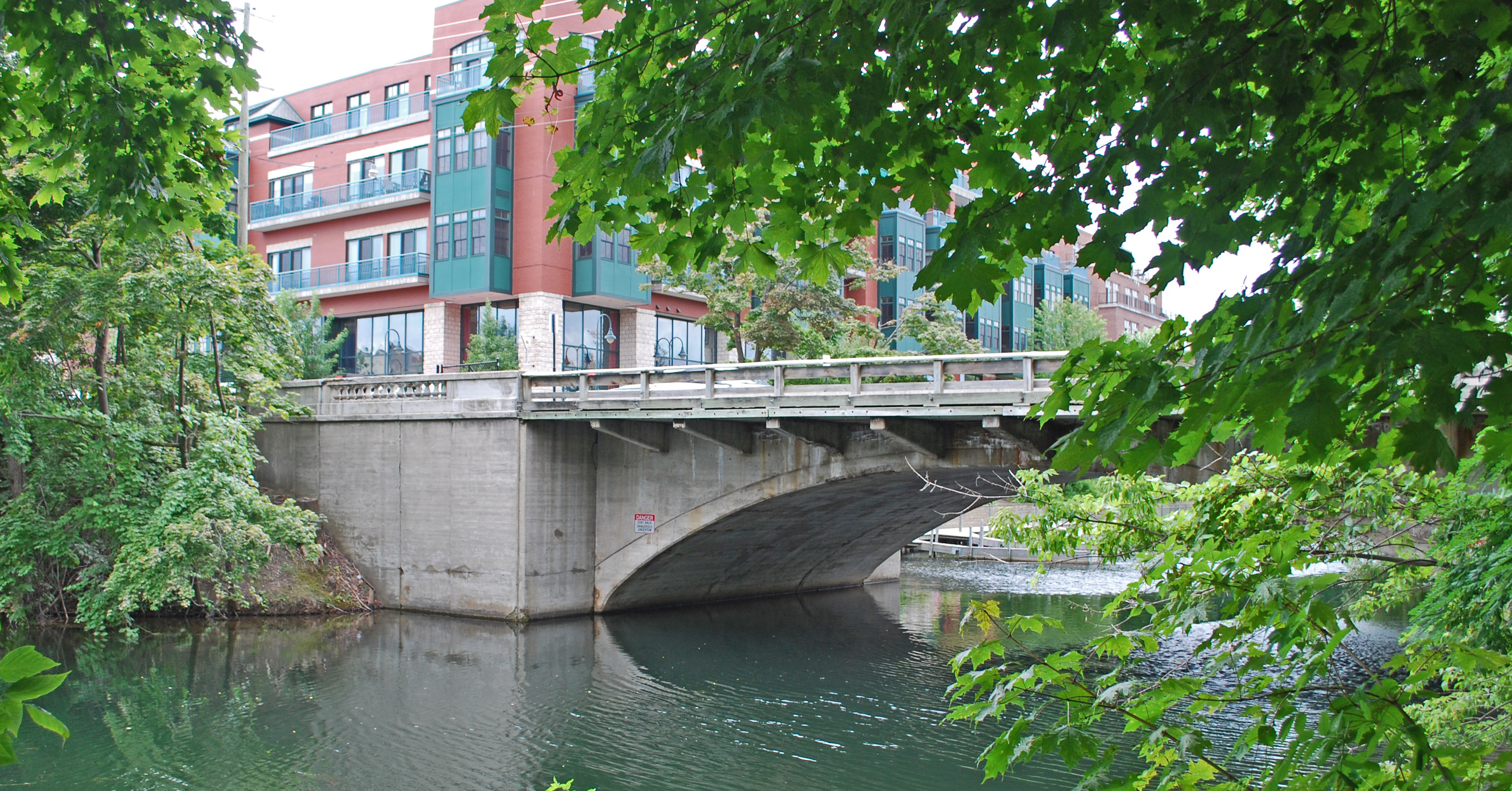
The American Legion Memorial Bridge, which carries Cass Street over the Boardman River near downtown Traverse City, 2010

== Drainage basin ==
The Boardman River drains the following municipalities (italicized municipalities are those which the river drains but does not flow through):

- Grand Traverse County
  - Blair Township
  - East Bay Township
  - Fife Lake Township
  - Garfield Township
  - Green Lake Township
  - Long Lake Township
  - Mayfield Township
  - Paradise Township
  - Traverse City
  - Union Township
  - Whitewater Township
- Kalkaska County
  - Boardman Township
  - Coldsprings Township
  - Excelsior Township
  - Garfield Township
  - Kalkaska
  - Kalkaska Township
  - Orange Township
  - Rapid River Township
  - Springfield Township

The Boardman River also drains the following lakes:

- Arbutus Lake
- Bass Lake
- Rennie Lake
- Silver Lake
- Spider Lake

== See also ==
- Manistee River, whose watershed drains land east and south of Boardman River's watershed.
- List of rivers of Michigan
