= Chums Corner, Michigan =

- Census-designated place (CDP) & unincorporated community
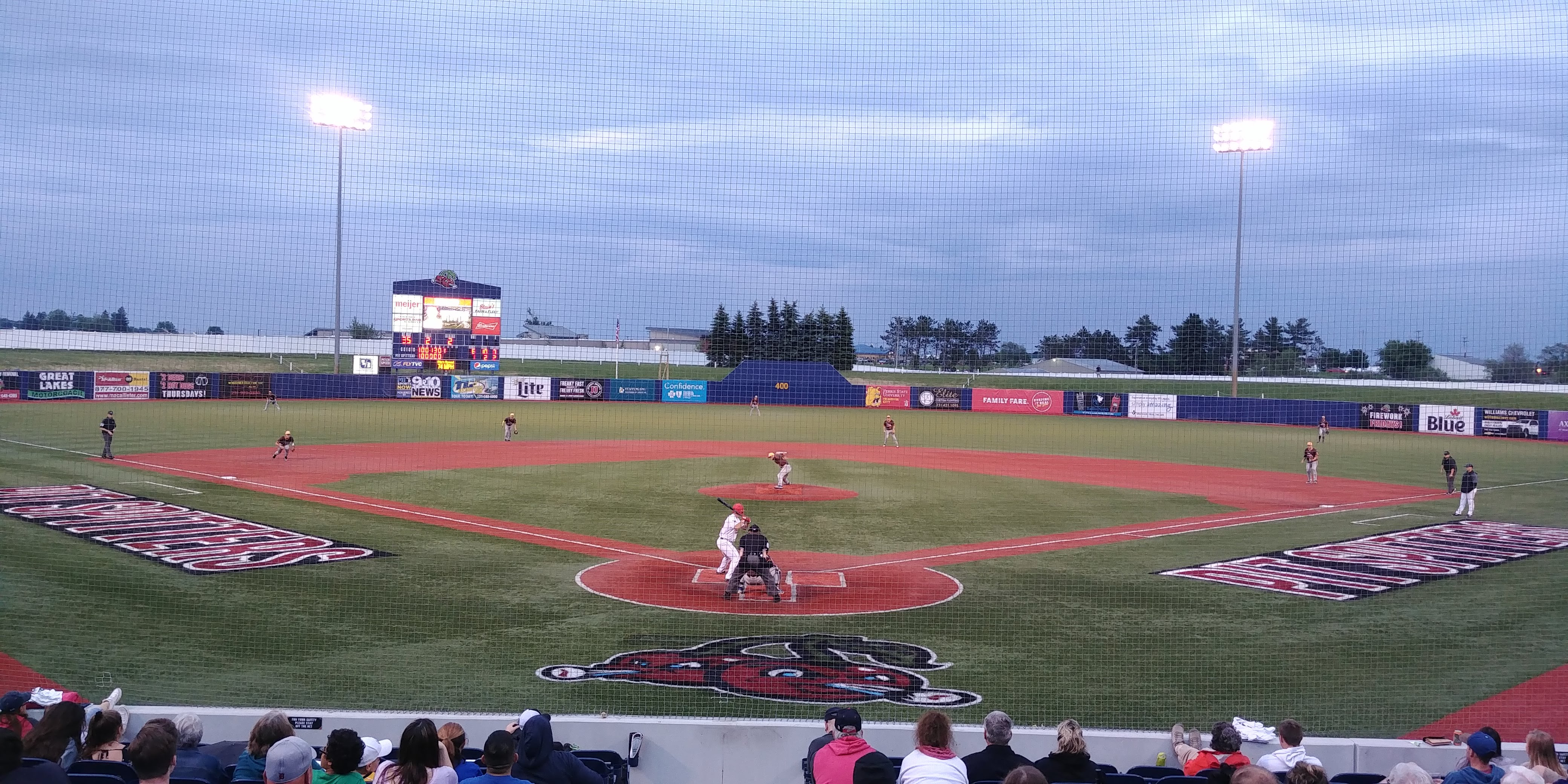
- A Traverse City Pit Spitters game at Turtle Creek Stadium in Chums Corner
- Nickname: "Chums"
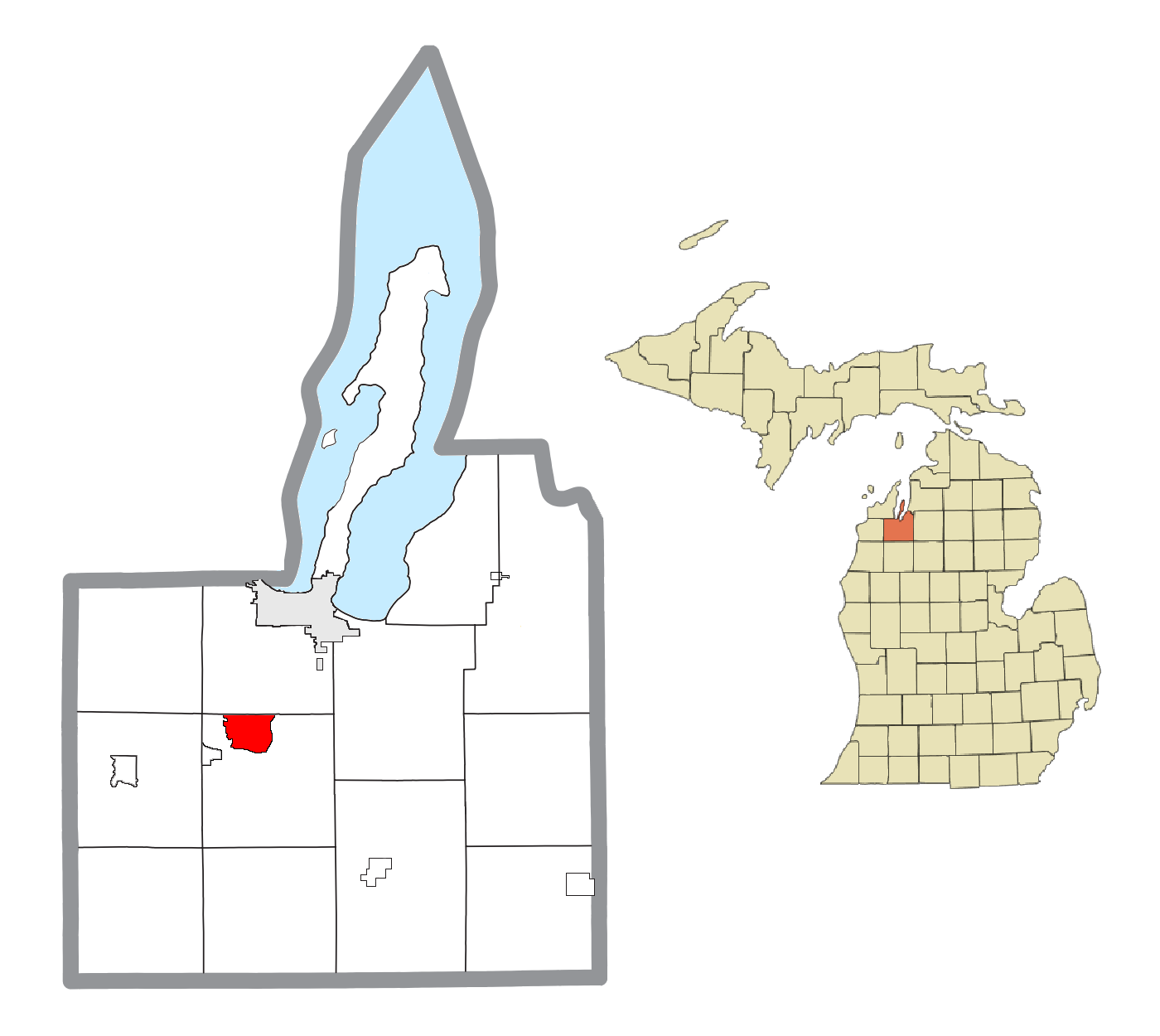
- Location within Grand Traverse County

- Location within the state of Michigan Location within the United States
- Coordinates: 44°40′19″N 85°39′23″W
- Country: United States
- State: Michigan
- County: Grand Traverse
- Township: Blair

Area
  - Total: 2.80 sq mi (7.24 km^{2})
  - Land: 2.66 sq mi (6.89 km^{2})
  - Water: 0.14 sq mi (0.35 km^{2})
- Elevation: 889 ft (271 m)

Population (2020)
  - Total: 1,065
  - Density: 400.4/sq mi (154.61/km^{2})
- Time zone: UTC-5 (Eastern (EST))
  - Summer (DST): UTC-4 (EDT)
- ZIP code(s): 49685 (Traverse City)
- Area code: 231
- GNIS feature ID: 6223278

Chums Corner (also called Chum's Corner, Chums Corners, or simply Chums) is an unincorporated community and census-designated place (CDP) in Grand Traverse County in the U.S. state of Michigan. According to the 2020 census, the population was 1,065. The community is located within Blair Township.

== History ==
Historically, the area that is now Chums Corner was traversed by what is now known as the Old Indian Trail, a trail which serviced travel for the Anishinaabe between Lake Mitchell, near Cadillac, and Grand Traverse Bay, in Traverse City.

Around 1932, Deronda "Chum" Crandall and his wife Eva began operating a gas station and a grocery store at a major highway intersection a few miles south of Traverse City. Over the years the intersection became known as "Chum's Corners". Chum sold the business and retired in 1953, and died in Traverse City in early 1959.

The community of Chums Corner was listed as a newly-organized census-designated place for the 2010 census, meaning it was given officially defined boundaries and population statistics for the first time. The population at this time was 946.

In 2020, Chasten Buttigieg, spouse of United States Secretary of Transportation Pete Buttigieg, wrote I Have Something to Tell You, a memoir which includes anecdotes about Buttigieg's childhood growing up in a neighborhood in Chums Corner.

== Geography ==
According to the U.S. Census Bureau, the CDP has a total area of 2.66 square miles (6.89 km^{2}), all land.

=== Major highways ===
- US 31 enters from the west and takes a 90° angle north in the center of the community.
- M-37 runs south–north through the center of the community and merges concurrent with U.S. Route 31.

== Demographics ==
Historical population
Census	Pop.	Note	%±
2010	946		—
2020	1,065		12.6%
U.S. Decennial Census

== Education ==
It is within Traverse City Area Public Schools.

== Notable person ==
- Chasten Buttigieg, spouse of former South Bend mayor and former United States Secretary of Transportation Pete Buttigieg, was raised in Chums Corner.
