= Boardman River Trail =

- Location within Michigan
- Location: Lower Peninsula, Grand Traverse County, USA
- Nearest city: Mayfield, Michigan
- Coordinates: 44.632436°N 85.521045°W
- Governing body: Grand Traverse County Road Commission
- Trailheads: Mayfield, MI
- Use: Mountain biking, Hiking
- Difficulty: Difficult
- Surface: Dirt
- Website: Official site

This trail will be part of a future loop around Grand Traverse County connecting with the VASA trail, Boardman Lake Trail and North County Trail. Currently the segment between Mayfield, MI and North Country Trail is one of the 24 mile trail segments done. However segment 2 which is Mayfield, MI to Bietner Rd. will take some time while preliminary work is beginning to identify property and trail routes. Section III from S. Airport Road to Beitner Rd is next to construct in 2015 followed by Section II between Beitner Road to Mayfield.
