= Mayfield Township, Michigan =

Mayfield Township is the name of some places in the U.S. state of Michigan:

- Mayfield Township, Grand Traverse County, Michigan
- Mayfield Township, Lapeer County, Michigan

== See also ==
- Mayfield, Michigan, an unincorporated community in Paradise Township, Grand Traverse County
