= Kingsley Area Schools =

School district in Michigan, United States

Address
- 402 Fenton Street Kinglsey, Grand Traverse County, Michigan, 49649; United States

District information
- Grades: Pre-Kindergarten-12
- Superintendent: Joshua T. Rothwell
- Schools: 3
- Budget: $21,301,000 2022-2023 expenditures
- NCES District ID: 2620380

Students and staff
- Students: 1,430 (2024-2025)
- Teachers: 85.12 (on an FTE basis) (2024-2025)
- Staff: 168.61 FTE (2024-2025)
- Student–teacher ratio: 16.8 (2024-2025)

Other information
- Website: www.kingsleyschools.org

Kingsley Area Schools is a public school district in the Northern Michigan. It serves Kingsley, Paradise Township, and parts of the townships of Blair, Fife Lake, Grant, Green Lake, Mayfield, and Union in Grand Traverse County. It also serves part of Greenwood Township in Wexford County.

== History ==
A new school in Kingsley was built around 1938, with additional construction around 1952. Pictured in the 1958 yearbook of Kingsley Area School, it was a 2-story building with rubble stone walls. The 1964 yearbook shows the next school under construction, and the 1965 yearbook shows it completed, with rubble stone accent walls surrounding the main entrance. This building served as the middle/high school until the current high school opened in fall 2001, when it became a stand-alone middle school.

In February 2004, extensive and potentially catastrophic structural problems in the roof of Kingsley High School were discovered, leading to the temporary closure of the building. As the district sought locations to hold classes while repairs were completed, students missed ten days of school. While the district lengthened the remaining school days to avoid extending the school year, it would still not meet its state-mandated instructional time, a crisis that would require a legislative solution. On June 3, 2004, Governor Jennifer Granholm approved Public Act 127 of 2004, which would allow districts to mitigate the financial or regulatory penalty due to missed instructional time caused by disasters or structural damage.

== Schools ==
Schools in Kingsley Area Schools district
School	Address	Notes
Kingsley High School	7475 Kingsley Road, Kingsley	Grades 9–12. Built 2001.
Kingsley Middle School	403 Blair Street, Kingsley	Grades 5–8. Built 1964.
Kingsley Elementary	402 Fenton Street, Kingsley	Grades PreK-4
