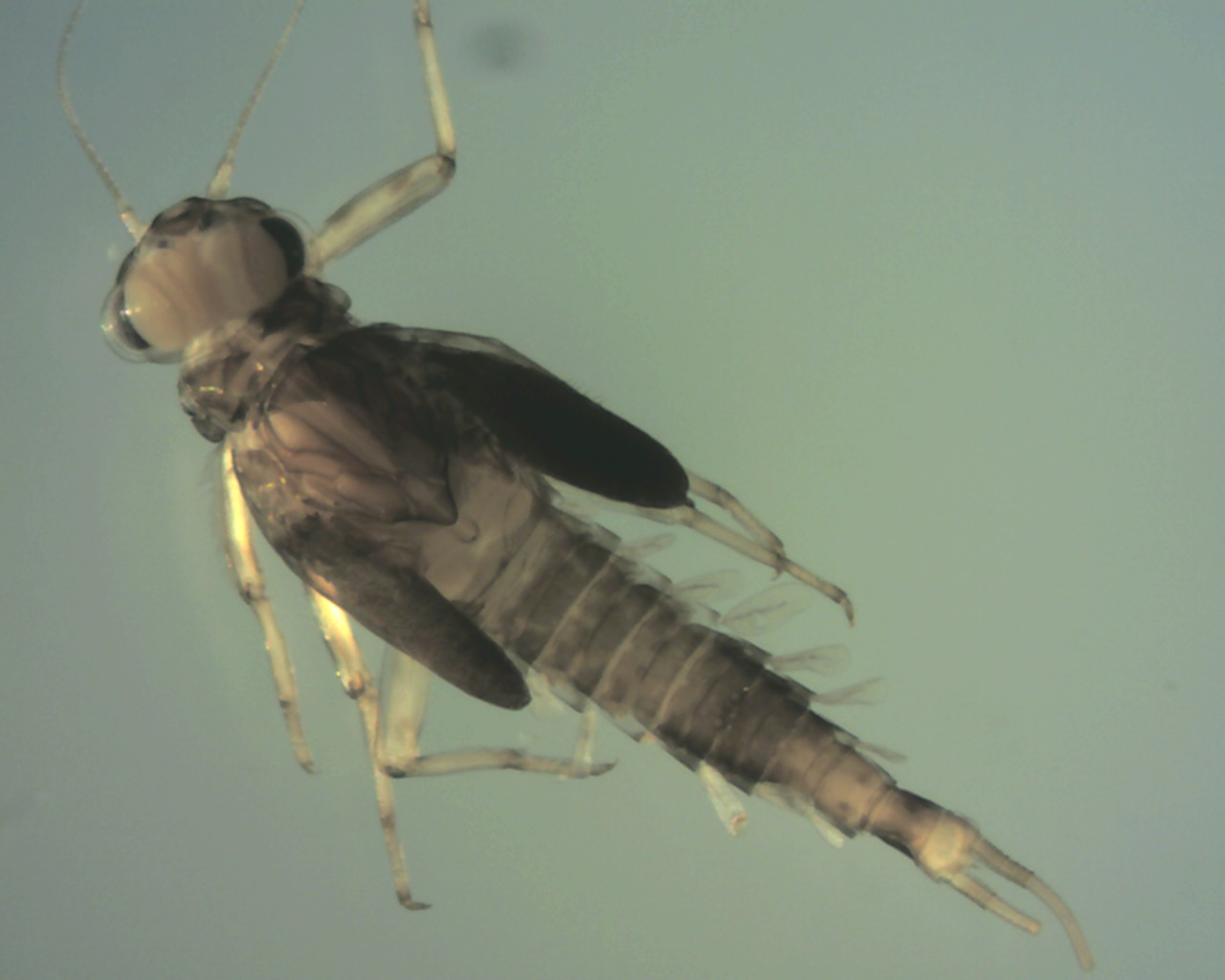

Scientific classification
- Kingdom: Animalia
- Phylum: Arthropoda
- Class: Insecta
- Order: Ephemeroptera
- Family: Baetidae
- Genus: Acerpenna; Waltz & McCafferty, 1987

= Acerpenna =

Genus of mayflies

Acerpenna is a genus of mayflies in the small minnow mayfly family, Baetidae, with at least three species.

== Species ==
- Acerpenna akataleptos — (McDunnough, 1926)
- Acerpenna pygmaea, Blue-Winged Olive — (Hagen, 1861)
- Acerpenna macdunnoughi — (Ide, 1937)

et al.

== Importance ==
The blue wing olive mayflies of family Baetidae are one of the most common aquatic insects in coldwater rivers. Their appearances are replicated with artificial fly patterns for fly fishing for trout and other species in North America and, less commonly, in Great Britain. Along with the Adams dry fly, it is one of the most popular dry style flies in the United States.
