= Bay View, Little Traverse and Mackinaw Railroad =

Overview
- Dates of operation: 1879–1888
- Successor: Grand Rapids and Indiana Railroad

Technical
- Length: 5.8 miles (9.3 km)

The Bay View, Little Traverse and Mackinaw Railroad was a railroad company in the United States. It was incorporated in 1879 to construct a line from the Grand Rapids and Indiana Railroad north of Petoskey, Michigan, to Harbor Springs, Michigan, on Little Traverse Bay. The line opened in 1882. The company was sold to the Grand Rapids and Indiana Railroad and eventually became part of the Pennsylvania Railroad system. The line was abandoned in 1962. The former station in Harbor Springs has been preserved.

== History ==
The Bay View, Little Traverse and Mackinaw Railroad was incorporated on April 22, 1879. (Note: Other sources give May 2, 1879, which is the date the articles of incorporation were filed with the Secretary of State.) The company's purpose was to build from the main line of the Grand Rapids and Indiana Railroad around Little Traverse Bay to Harbor Springs, Michigan, a distance of approximately 6 miles (9.7 km). Although the officers and board of directors included a number of local men from Harbor Springs, the company owned no rolling stock of its own and the Grand Rapids and Indiana exercised control from the outset.

Construction of the line began on June 24, 1881. The junction point on the Grand Rapids and Indiana line was at "Kegomic," near Bay View. The line, 5.8 miles (9.3 km), opened on February 1, 1882. The Bay View, Little Traverse and Mackinaw Railroad was sold to the Grand Rapids and Indiana on January 17, 1888. The Grand Rapids and Indiana extended the line, now called the Harbor Springs branch, a further 0.5 miles (0.80 km) north in 1901; this extension was abandoned between 1904 and 1913. The Pennsylvania Railroad, successor to the GR&I, abandoned the branch in 1962. former station in Harbor Springs, completed in 1889 after the formal acquisition by the GR&I, has been preserved.
