= Mayfield, Michigan =

Unincorporated community in Grand Traverse County, Michigan

- Unincorporated community
- Nickname: "Birthplace of the Adams Fly"
- Location within Michigan Location within the United States
- Coordinates: 44.626°N 85.530°W
- Country: United States
- State: Michigan
- County: Grand Traverse
- Township: Paradise
- Settled: 1868
- Elevation: 837 ft (255 m)
- Time zone: UTC-5 (Eastern (EST))
  - Summer (DST): UTC-4 (EDT)
- ZIP code(s): 49666; 49649 (Kingsley); 49696 (Traverse City)
- Area code: 231
- GNIS feature ID: 631772

Mayfield is an unincorporated community in Grand Traverse County in the U.S. state of Michigan. It is located in Paradise Township between Kingsley and Traverse City along South Garfield Road (County Road 611). As an unincorporated community, Mayfield has no legally defined boundaries or population statistics of its own.

== History ==
The land on which Mayfield sits has long been territory under the Council of Three Fires; the Ojibwe, Odawa, and Potawatomi.

In 1868, a sawmill was built upon Swainston Creek, a tributary of the Boardman River. Later, a grist mill was built, and the settlement was named Beulah. However, in 1869, the community was awarded a post office under the name of Mayfield, named after the adjacent township. In 1872, a line of the Pennsylvania Railroad was extended from Cadillac via Walton and Mayfield to Traverse City.

In 1922, Leonard Halladay, a Michigan fly tyer from Mayfield, conceived the popular Adams Fly as a general mayfly imitation. It was first fished by an Ohio attorney and friend of Halladay, Judge Charles F. Adams on the Boardman River near Traverse City. Charles Adams reported his success with the fly to Halladay who named the fly after his friend. For this reason, Mayfield is known as the "Birthplace of the Adams Fly".

In 1961, Mayfield Pond, the small impoundment on Swainston Creek, was washed out in a rainstorm, subsequently leading to the failure of the Keystone Dam, upstream on the Boardman River. In 1987, the pond nearly failed again, but a washout was prevented.

== See also ==
- Pere Marquette State Forest
- Traverse City Railroad
