= Acerpenna akataleptos =

Scientific classification
- Domain: Eukaryota
- Kingdom: Animalia
- Phylum: Arthropoda
- Class: Insecta
- Order: Ephemeroptera
- Family: Baetidae
- Genus: Acerpenna
- Species: A. akataleptos

Binomial name
- Acerpenna akataleptos (McDunnough, 1926)

Species of mayfly

Acerpenna akataleptos is a species of small minnow mayfly in the family Baetidae. It is found in North America.
