= Harbor Springs station =

- Grand Rapids and Indiana Railroad Harbor Springs Depot
- U.S. National Register of Historic Places
- Michigan State Historic Site
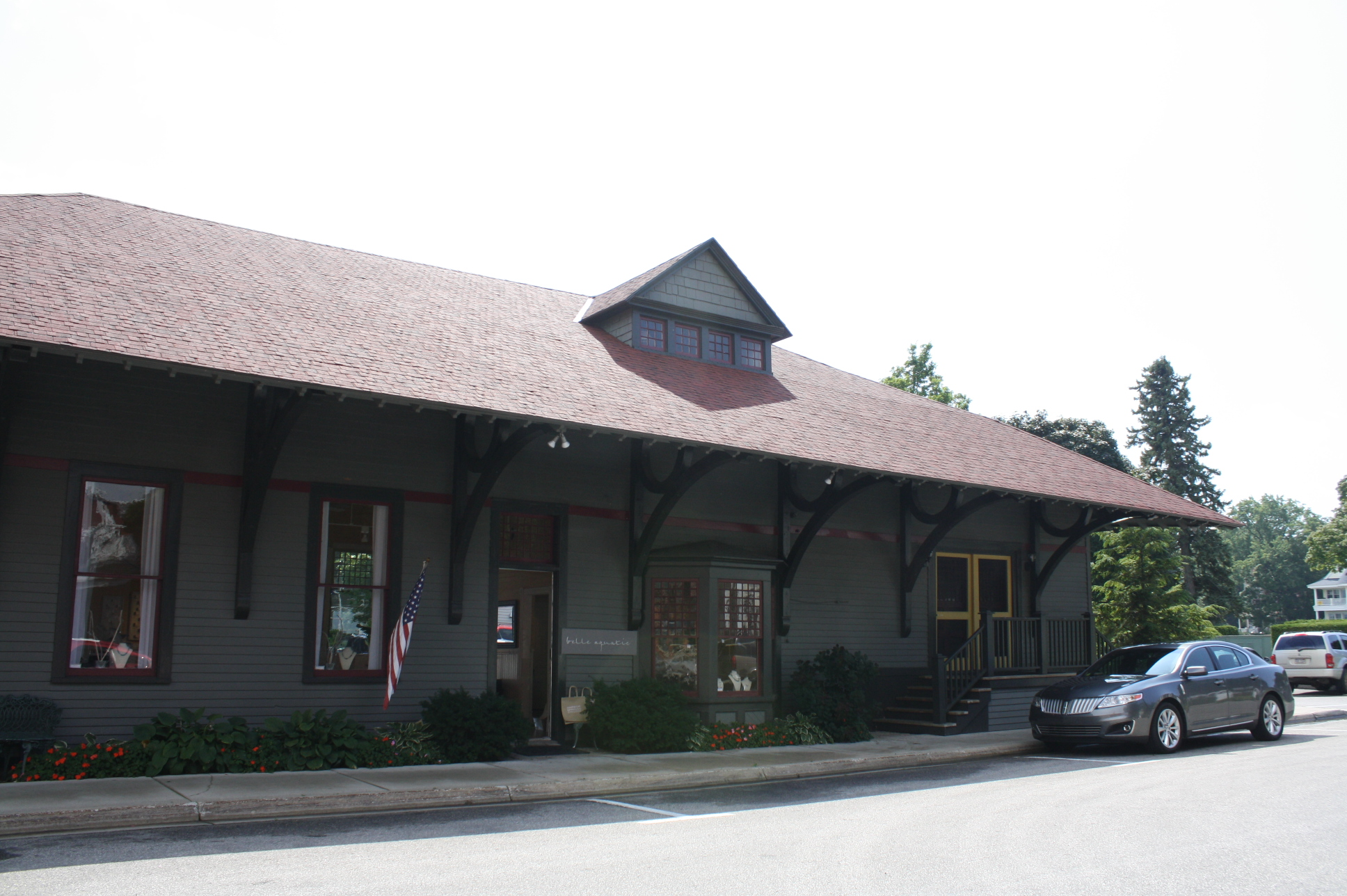

- Location within Michigan Location within the United States
- Interactive map
- Location: 111 W. Bay St., Harbor Springs, Michigan
- Coordinates: 45°25′43″N 84°59′22″W
- Area: less than one acre
- Built: 1889
- Architect: Sidney J. Osgood
- Architectural style: Stick style/Eastlake
- NRHP reference No.: 00001487
- Added to NRHP: December 7, 2000

Harbor Springs is a depot located at 111 West Bay Street in Harbor Springs, Michigan. It was listed on the National Register of Historic Places in 2000 as the Grand Rapids and Indiana Railroad Harbor Springs Depot. As of 2016, the building houses the Depot Club and Restaurant.

== History ==
The Grand Rapids and Indiana Railroad built a line to service Petoskey in 1874. The greater access to the area led to an influx of new residents, and the village of Harbor Springs was incorporated in 1880. The railway constructed a branch line to Harbor Springs in 1882. This depot, designed by Grand Rapids architect Sidney J. Osgood, was constructed in 1889 to serve the railway. The Pennsylvania Railroad acquired the railroad in 1918.

The station was at the end of a 7.9 mile short line, used for summer season trains timed to meet up in Petoskey with the Pennsylvania Railroad's Northern Arrow.

The depot was in use as a passenger station until 1962. Rail service itself ended in 1951, and a bus shuttle was established the following year. After the depot went out of service, the depot was purchased by the next door Walstrom Marine Company, and was leased seasonally by different retail businesses. In 1995, it was sold to a local builder, and in 2000 was sold again with the intention of rehabilitating the building. As of 2016, the building houses the Depot Club and Restaurant.

== Description ==
The Grand Rapids and Indiana Railroad Harbor Springs Depot is a single-story, ell-shaped Stick style/Eastlake building with a hipped roof. It consists of two parts: a long passenger wing with wide projecting eaves and a shorter baggage portion, with narrower overhangs, situated at right angles to the main section. The dominant architectural features of the building are the oversized, curving brackets supporting the wide eaves on the passenger wing.

The building is clad with beveled clapboard, and contains double-hung windows and paneled doors. A large bay window, originally the ticket office, fronts onto Bay Street. Doors in the passenger section have a glassed transom; doors in the baggage section contain small square lights within the door itself. Two gables in the roof provide light to the attic. The original wood-shingled roof has been replaced with asphalt shingles' likely in the late 1940s.

On the interior of the depot, the original passenger area has walls and ceiling finished in tongue-and-groove boarding, placed vertically below the level of the windowsills and horizontally above. It has the original maple flooring. The original baggage portion of the depot has more utilitarian walls and open-truss roof framing, and most of the floor is elevated to the height of a wagon to facilitate loading of baggage. Between the passenger area and the baggage room is the original ticket office containing the large bay window.

Preceding station	Pennsylvania Railroad	Following station
Terminus	Harbor Springs Branch	Bay View toward Petoskey
