= Acerpenna macdunnoughi =

Scientific classification
- Domain: Eukaryota
- Kingdom: Animalia
- Phylum: Arthropoda
- Class: Insecta
- Order: Ephemeroptera
- Family: Baetidae
- Genus: Acerpenna
- Species: A. macdunnoughi

Binomial name
- Acerpenna macdunnoughi (Ide, 1937)

Synonyms
- Baetis macdunnoughi Ide, 1937

Species of mayfly

Acerpenna macdunnoughi is a species of small minnow mayfly in the family Baetidae. It is found in North America.
