= Kingsley Club =

Golf course

The Kingsley Club
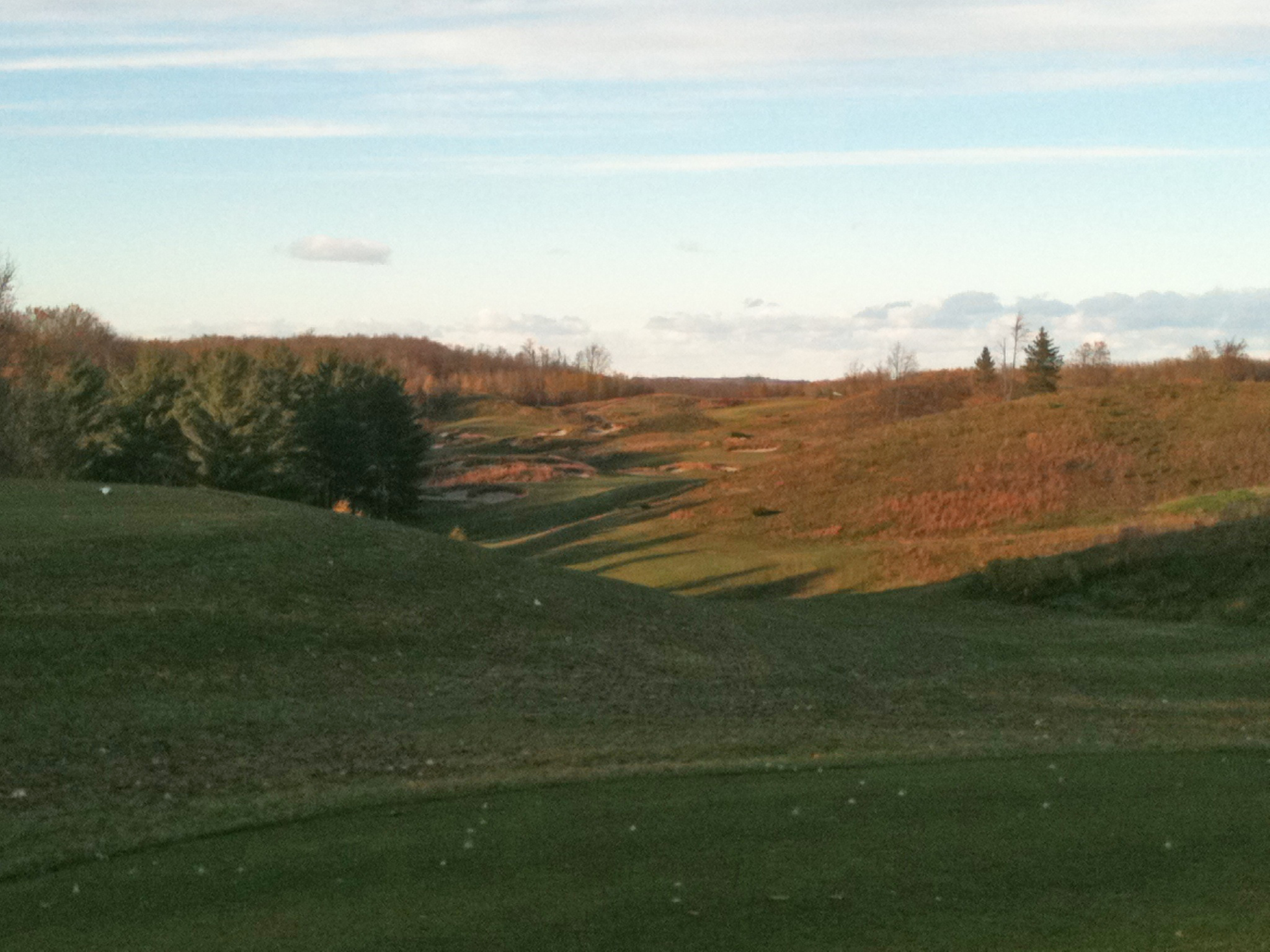
- Interactive map of The Kingsley Club
- 44°36′19″N 85°33′48″W

Club information
- Established: 2001
- Type: Private
- Owner: Kingsley Club LLC
- Tota holes: 18
- Greens: Bent grass
- Fairways: Fescue
- Website: http://www.kingsleyclub.com
- Designed by: Mike DeVries
- Par: 71
- Length: 6956
- Course rating: 73.2
- Slope rating: 141

Kingsley Club is a private golf course located near Kingsley, Michigan. Opened in 2001 with the motto "In the spirit of the game", the course is private.

== Facilities ==
Unlike many modern courses with extravagant clubhouses, the Kingsley Club's facilities are relatively low-key; the course is located on a dirt road (which narrows to a single lane at one point) well away from the nearest highway. The clubhouse holds just a small pro shop and food service area. Cottages overlooking the 17th hole are available for rental to members. The course features a practice putting green and driving range. Golfers can either walk the course or ride in electric carts, and forecaddies are available for player assistance.

== Course ==
Designed to evoke links-style golf from the British Isles, the course is covered with rolling hills of natural terrain and more than 120 bunkers. Course designer Mike DeVries used much of the natural landscape to shape the course, moving only about 20,000 cubic yards (15,000 m^{3}) of earth during construction; one member described the natural construction of the course by saying "They found the course on the land. They moved only a little dirt to uncover it."

Tee	Rating/Slope	1	2	3	4	5	6	7	8	9	Out	10	11	12	13	14	15	16	17	18	In	Total
Championship	73.2 / 141	602/585	161	426	411	222	396	569	360	165/135	3312/3265	446	180	455	292	615	465	225	544	422	3644	6956/6909
Member	70.8 / 133	568	161	412	411	191	373	512	360	165/135	3153/3123	393	180	425	292	510	421	175	509	422	3327	6480/6450
Blue	67.7 / 127	568	140	412	385	191	373	512	349	148/125	3078/3055	393	141	425	271	510	421	175	509	386	3231	6309/6286
White	67.7 / 127	542	115	374	376	178	306	490	321	115/106	2817/2808	364	121	335	246	466	408	154	484	360	2938	5755/5746
Red	69.5 / 129	480	73	287	281	140	270	447	251	106/73	2335/2302	300	114	335	246	445	370	138	412	292	2652	4987/4954
Par		5	3	4	4	3	4	5	4	3	35	4	3	4	4	5	4	3	5	4	36	71
SI		4	6	2	18	12	14	8	16	10		11	13	3	17	7	1	9	15	5

The member tees are a mixture of championship tees (holes 2, 4, 8, 11, 13, and 18) and blue tees. The par-3 ninth hole has two separate sets of tee boxes; the longer tees approach the green from the south, the shorter from the west.

In 2013, Golfweek magazine ranked the course the 24th on its list of the best modern courses. Links Magazine placed the course as the 57th best course in the United States

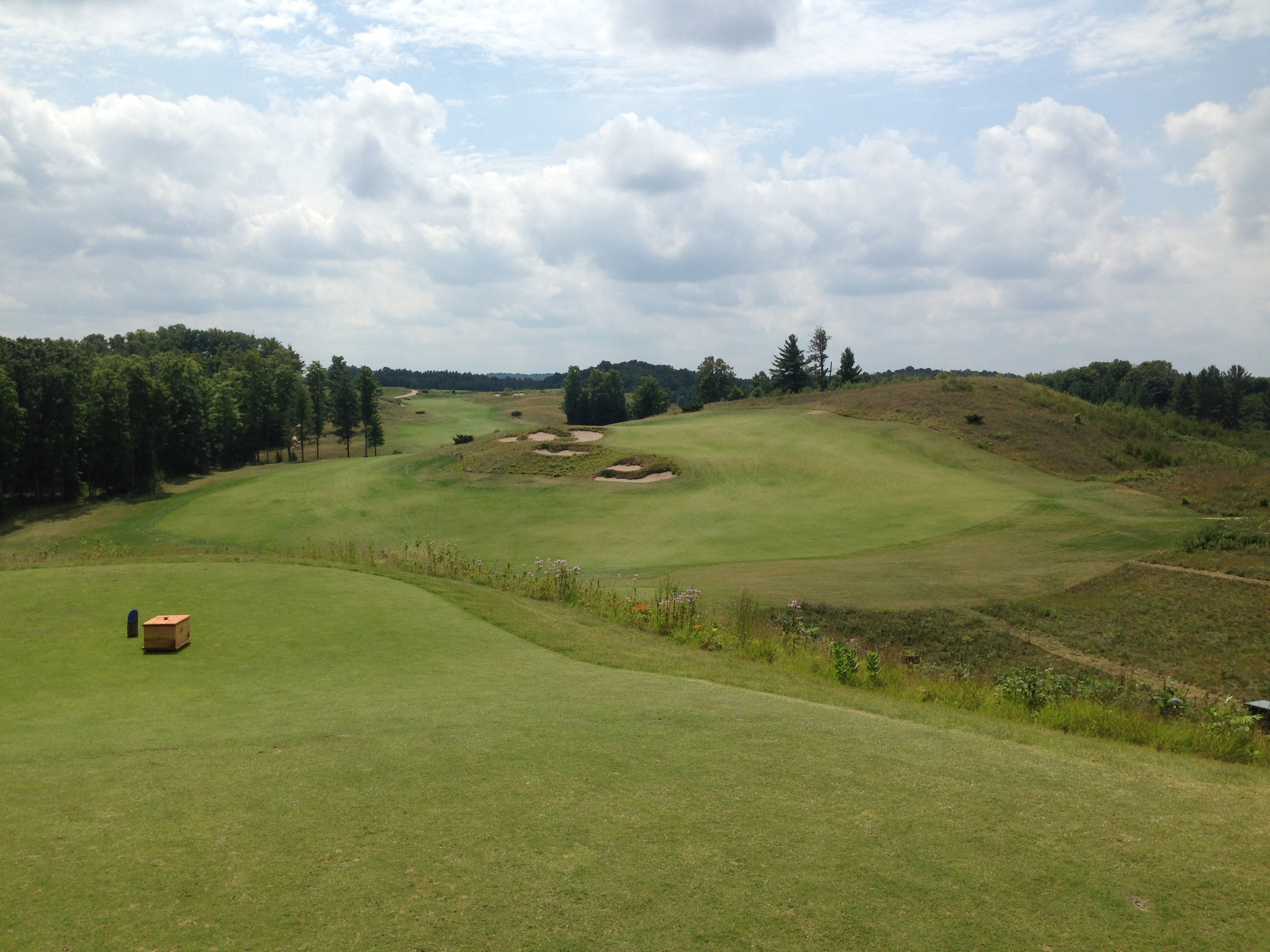
The view from the tee box of the first hole

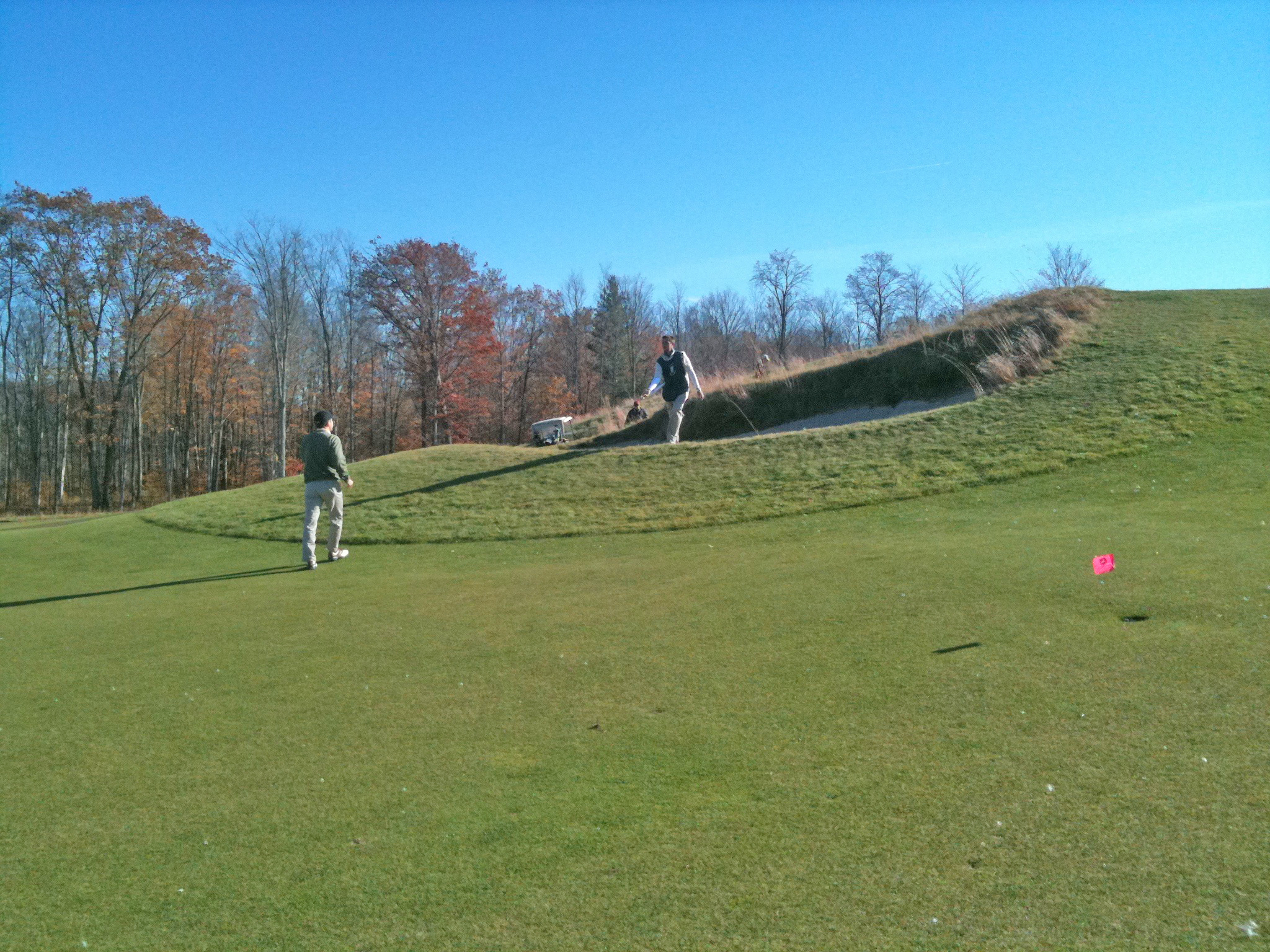
Hole #1 fairway bunker at the Kingsley Club, Kingsley MI
