= Paradise Township, Michigan =

- Civil township
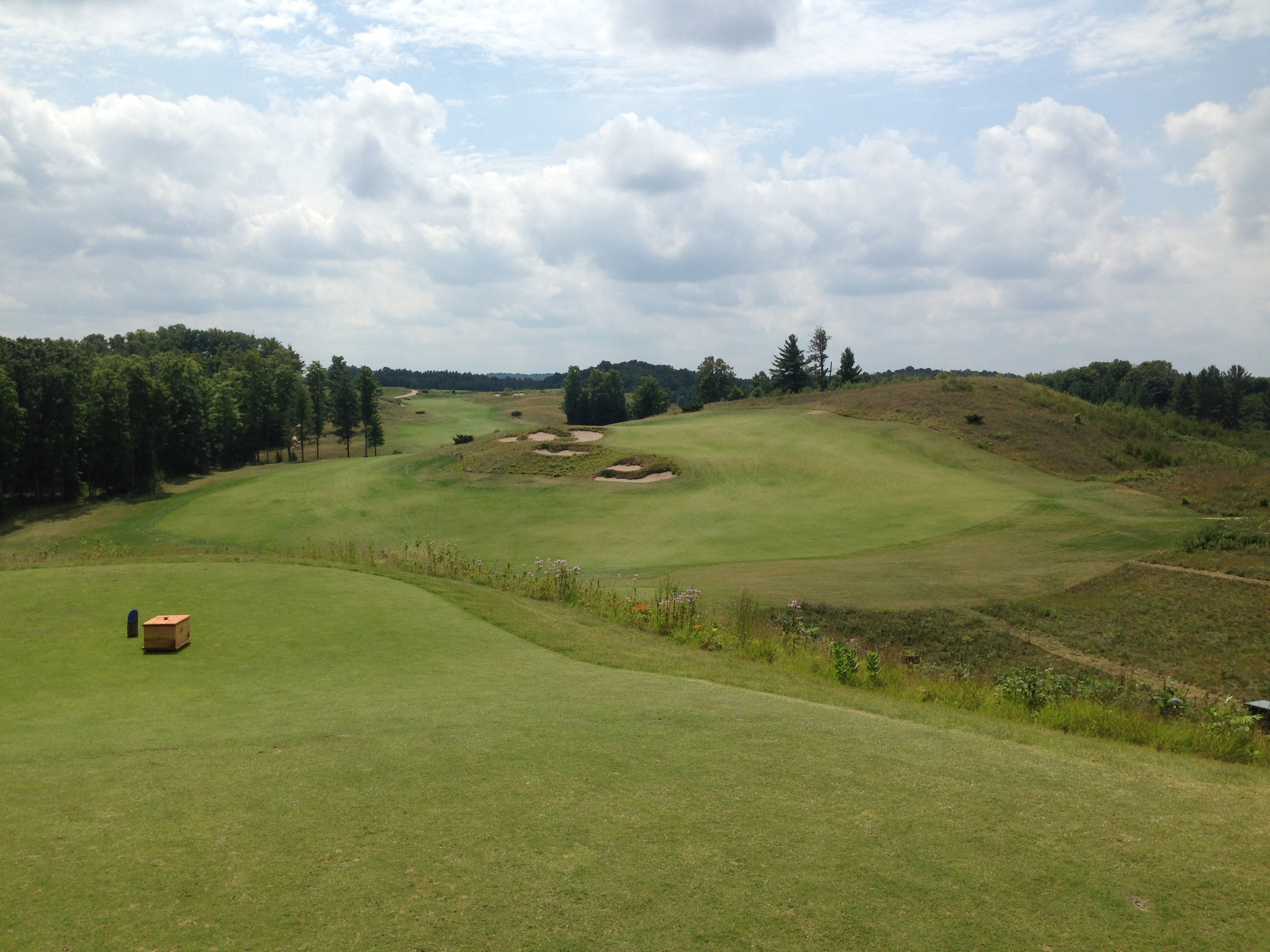
- Kingsley Club
- Motto: "Looking Towards the Future"
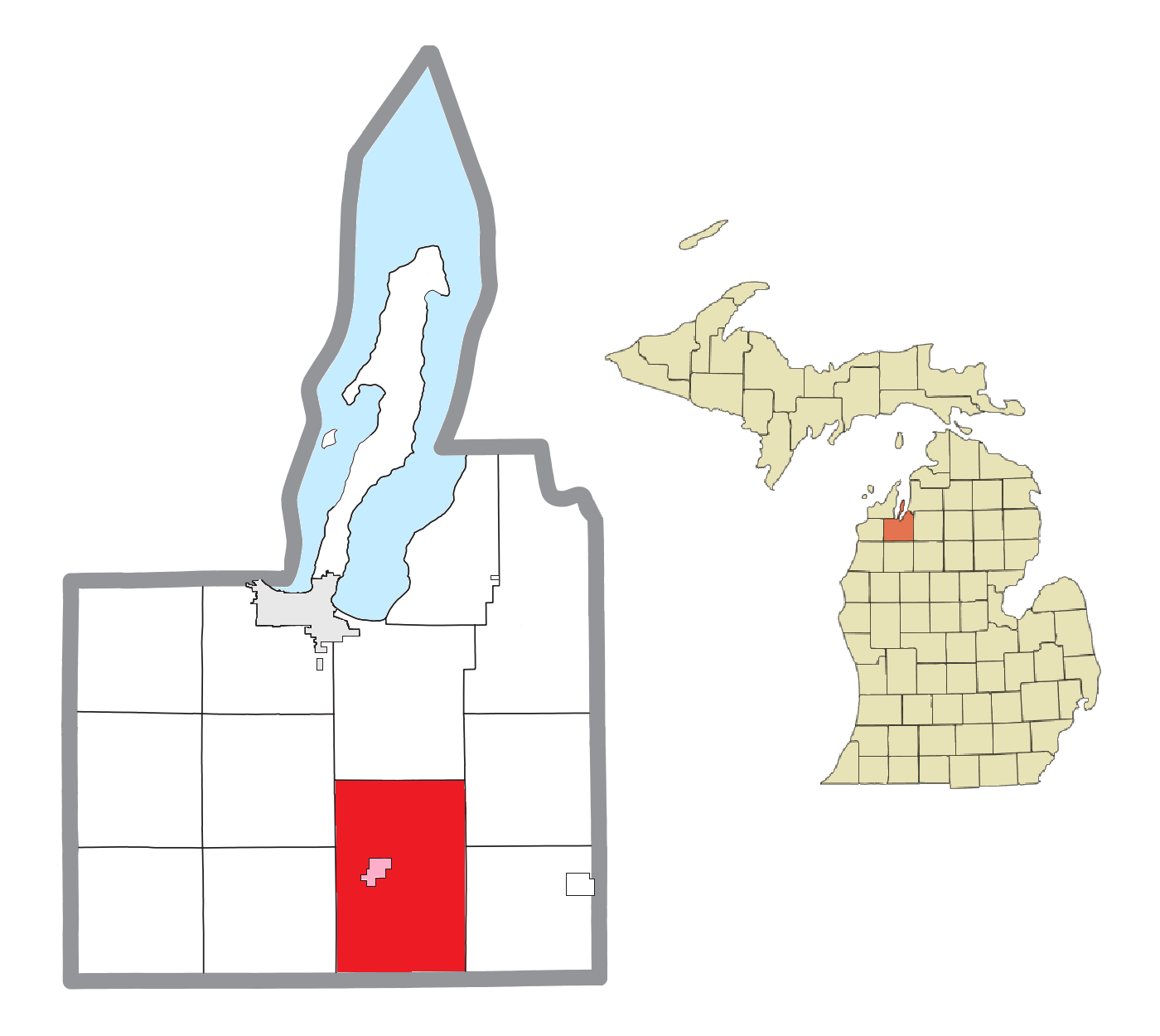
- Location within Grand Traverse County (red) and the administered village of Kingsley (pink)

- Location within the state of Michigan Paradise Township (the United States)
- Coordinates: 44°35′25″N 85°31′29″W
- Country: United States
- State: Michigan
- County: Grand Traverse
- Organized: April 1870

Government
  - Supervisor: Rob Lajko

Area
  - Total: 52.9 sq mi (137.1 km^{2})
  - Land: 52.9 sq mi (137.0 km^{2})
  - Water: 0.077 sq mi (0.2 km^{2})
- Elevation: 1,053 ft (321 m)

Population (2020)
  - Total: 4,952
  - Estimate (2025): 5,101
  - Density: 93/sq mi (36.1/km^{2})
- Time zone: UTC-5 (Eastern (EST))
  - Summer (DST): UTC-4 (EDT)
- ZIP code(s): 49649 (Kingsley); 49666 (Mayfield); 49696 (Traverse City)
- Area code: 231
- FIPS code: 26-62320
- GNIS feature ID: 1626879
- Website: https://www.paradisetwp.org/

Paradise Township is a civil township of Grand Traverse County in the U.S. state of Michigan. The population was 4,952 at the 2020 census, an increase from 4,713 at the 2010 census. The village of Kingsley is located within the township.

== History ==
Paradise Township was organized in April 1870 from a portion of Traverse Township – Town 25 north, of Ranges 9 and 10 west, and the south half of Township 26 north of Ranges 9 and 10 west.

== Communities ==
- The village of Kingsley is within the township. All of the township south of Mayfield is served by the Kingsley ZIP code 49649.
- Mayfield is an unincorporated community within the township a few miles north of Kingsley.
- Summit City is an unincorporated community within the township, several miles southeast of Kingsley at 44°33′03″N 85°30′54″W. Summit City was established as a station on the Traverse City Railroad, first called "Summit". A post office at Summit City lasted from 1874 to 1955.
- Westminster is a ghost town south of Kingsley at 44°33′59.4″N 85°32′48.7″W. It was founded as a station on the Traverse City Railroad, and was the site of a lumber mill completed in 1883.

== Geography ==
According to the United States Census Bureau, the township has a total area of 53.0 square miles (137 km^{2}), of which 52.9 square miles (137 km^{2}) is land and 0.1 square miles (0.26 km^{2}) (0.13%) is water. The Boardman River flows through the north of the township.

Paradise Township is the largest township in Grand Traverse County by land area, and second largest in total area, behind Whitewater Township. The township shares a boundary with Wexford County, to the south.

=== Major highway ===
- M-113 is a state trunkline highway that traverses the township east to west.

== Demographics ==
As of the census of 2000, there were 4,191 people, 1,374 households, and 1,082 families residing in the township. The population density was 79.3 inhabitants per square mile (30.6/km^{2}). There were 1,481 housing units at an average density of 28.0 per square mile (10.8/km^{2}). The racial makeup of the township was 97.07% White, 0.21% African American, 0.86% Native American, 0.19% Asian, 0.02% Pacific Islander, 0.45% from other races, and 1.19% from two or more races. Hispanic or Latino of any race were 1.48% of the population.

There were 1,374 households, out of which 45.7% had children under the age of 18 living with them, 62.8% were married couples living together, 11.1% had a female householder with no husband present, and 21.2% were non-families. 15.9% of all households were made up of individuals, and 5.5% had someone living alone who was 65 years of age or older. The average household size was 3.01 and the average family size was 3.32.

In the township the population was spread out, with 33.0% under the age of 18, 8.4% from 18 to 24, 33.1% from 25 to 44, 18.3% from 45 to 64, and 7.2% who were 65 years of age or older. The median age was 30 years. For every 100 females, there were 101.3 males. For every 100 females age 18 and over, there were 98.4 males.

The median income for a household in the township was $44,776, and the median income for a family was $45,652. Males had a median income of $34,804 versus $21,902 for females. The per capita income for the township was $16,507. About 4.5% of families and 5.2% of the population were below the poverty line, including 6.1% of those under age 18 and 6.1% of those age 65 or over.
