= Greenwood Township, Wexford County, Michigan =

Greenwood Township, Michigan
- Civil township
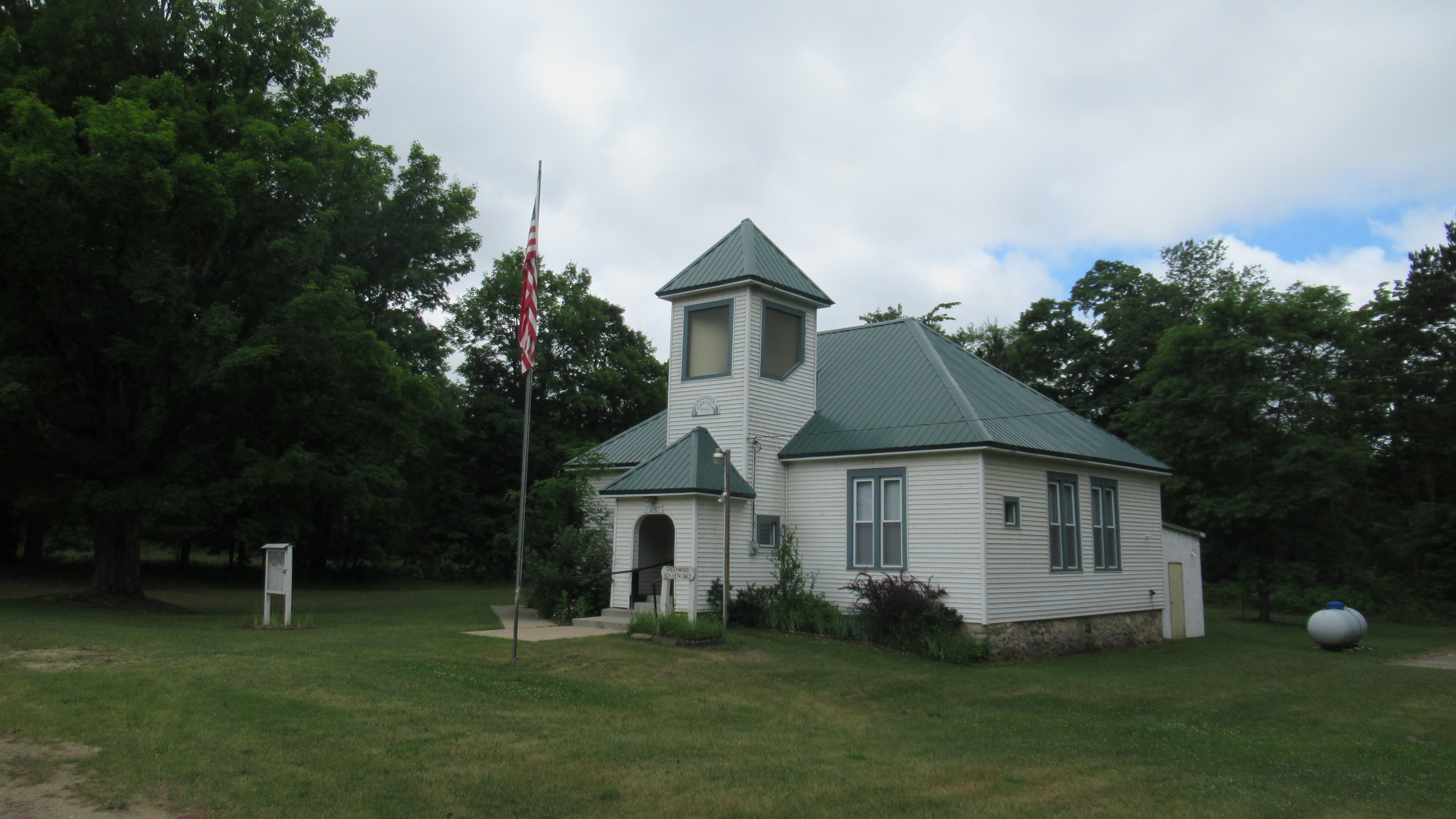
- Greenwood Township Hall

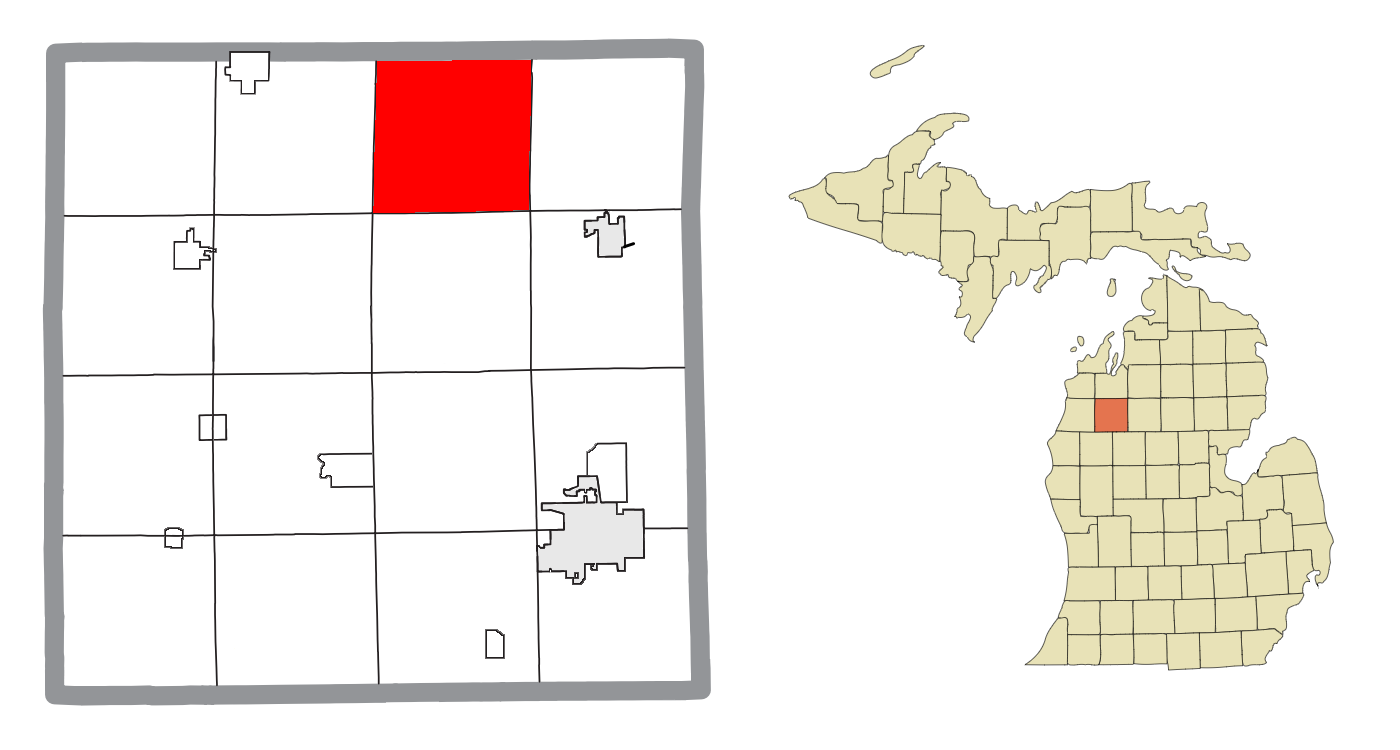
- Location within Wexford County

- Location within the state of Michigan Location within the United States
- Coordinates: 44°28′06″N 85°31′37″W
- Country: United States
- State: Michigan
- County: Wexford

Government
  - Supervisor: Alan Mohler
  - Clerk: Ronda Jones

Area
  - Total: 35.37 sq mi (91.61 km^{2})
  - Land: 35.36 sq mi (91.58 km^{2})
  - Water: 0.012 sq mi (0.03 km^{2})
- Elevation: 965 ft (294 m)

Population (2020)
  - Total: 633
  - Density: 17.9/sq mi (6.91/km^{2})
- Time zone: UTC-5 (Eastern (EST))
  - Summer (DST): UTC-4 (EDT)
- ZIP code(s): 49649 (Kingsley); 49663 (Manton)
- Area code: 231
- FIPS code: 26-35240
- GNIS feature ID: 1626406
- Website: https://www.gwtwp.org/

Greenwood Township is a civil township of Wexford County in the U.S. state of Michigan. The population was 633 at the 2020 census.

== Communities ==
- Baxter is an unincorporated community located within the township at 44°30′14″N 85°31′37″W. Baxter was settled as a train station on the Manistee and North-Eastern Railroad, and a post office opened on July 30, 1910. The station and post office are no longer in operation.
- Mystic is a former settlement that very briefly had a rural post office that operated from March 3, 1900, until August 31, 1901.

== Geography ==
According to the U.S. Census Bureau, the township has a total area of 35.37 square miles (91.61 km^{2}), of which 35.36 square miles (91.58 km^{2}) is land and 0.01 square miles (0.03 km^{2}) (0.03%) is water.

The Manistee River flows through the northern portion of the township.

== Demographics ==
As of the census of 2000, there were 542 people, 197 households, and 147 families residing in the township. The population density was 15.3 inhabitants per square mile (5.9/km^{2}). There were 346 housing units at an average density of 9.8 units per square mile (3.8 units/km^{2}). The racial makeup of the township was 97.60% White, 0.55% African American, 0.37% Native American, 0.18% from other races, and 1.29% from two or more races. Hispanic or Latino of any race were 1.85% of the population.

There were 197 households, out of which 36.0% had children under the age of 18 living with them, 62.9% were married couples living together, 7.6% had a female householder with no husband present, and 24.9% were non-families. 16.8% of all households were made up of individuals, and 8.1% had someone living alone who was 65 years of age or older. The average household size was 2.75 and the average family size was 3.12.

In the township the population was spread out, with 29.3% under the age of 18, 5.7% from 18 to 24, 28.0% from 25 to 44, 25.3% from 45 to 64, and 11.6% who were 65 years of age or older. The median age was 36 years. For every 100 females, there were 98.5 males. For every 100 females age 18 and over, there were 105.9 males.

The median income for a household in the township was $37,083, and the median income for a family was $39,250. Males had a median income of $31,250 versus $21,875 for females. The per capita income for the township was $15,009. About 9.6% of families and 12.3% of the population were below the poverty line, including 17.2% of those under age 18 and 3.7% of those age 65 or over.

== Education ==
Greenwood Township is served by three separate public school districts. The majority of the township is served by Manton Consolidated Schools to the southeast in Manton. A very narrow portion of the southwest corner of the township is served by Mesick Consolidated Schools to the west in Mesick. The northern section of the township is served by Kingsley Area Schools to the north in Grand Traverse County.
