= Acerpenna pygmaea =

Scientific classification
- Domain: Eukaryota
- Kingdom: Animalia
- Phylum: Arthropoda
- Class: Insecta
- Order: Ephemeroptera
- Family: Baetidae
- Genus: Acerpenna
- Species: A. pygmaea

Binomial name
- Acerpenna pygmaea (Hagen, 1861)

Synonyms
- Acerpenna harti McDunnough, 1924; Baetis harti Berner, 1940; Baetis spiethi (McDunnough, 1924); Cloe pygmaea Hagen, 1861

Species of mayfly

Acerpenna pygmaea, the tiny blue-winged olive, is a species of small minnow mayfly in the family Baetidae. It is found in all of Canada and the continental United States.
