= Decatur station (Pennsylvania Railroad) =

Former railway station in Indiana, United States

Decatur
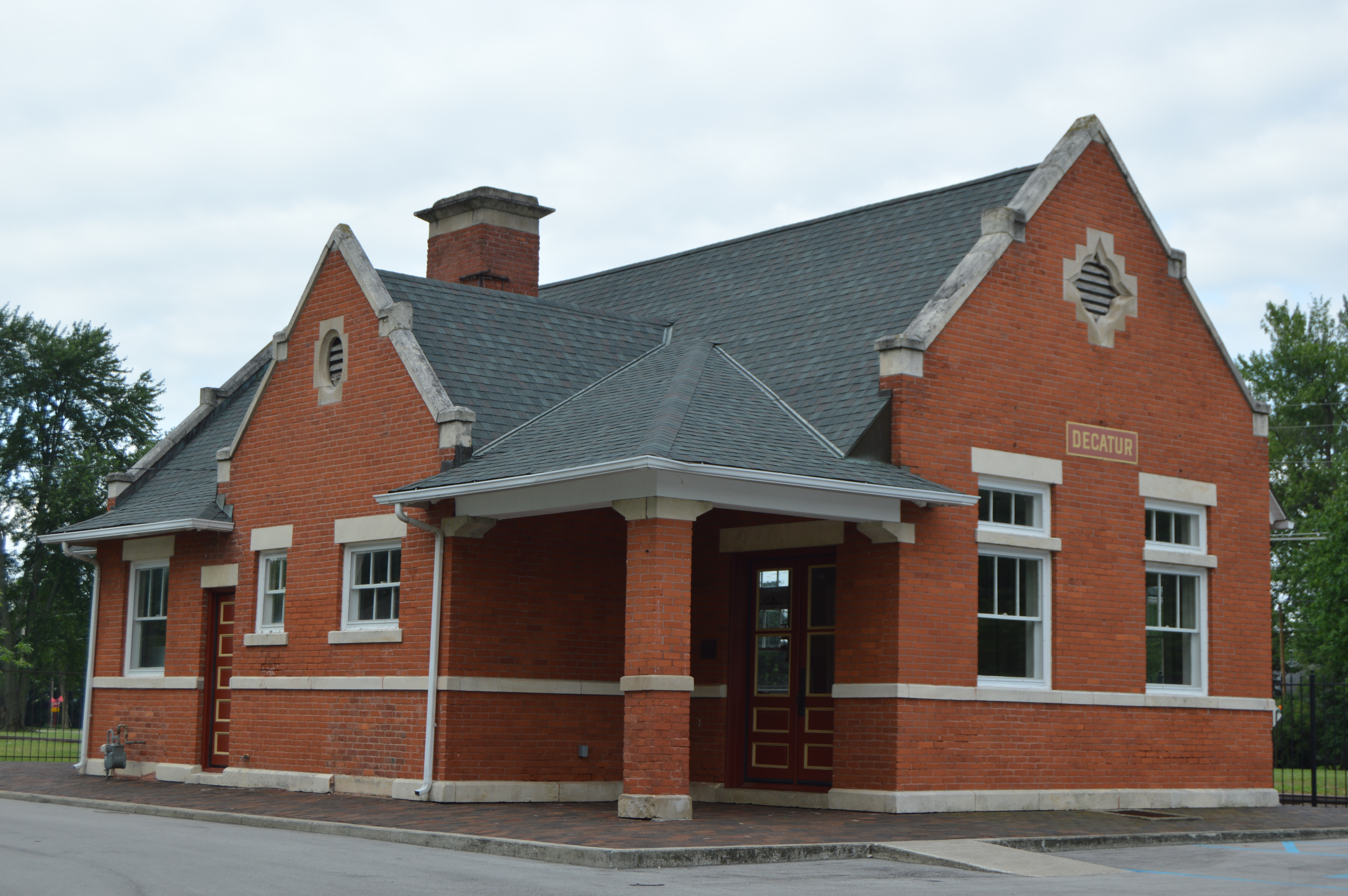
- Decatur Depot, June 2018

General information
- Location: 111 North 7th Street, Decatur, Indiana

History
- Opened: 1903
- Closed: 1957
- Original company: Grand Rapids and Indiana Railroad

Former services
Preceding station	Pennsylvania Railroad	Following station
Hoagland toward Mackinaw City	Grand Rapids & Indiana Railway	Monroe toward Richmond
- Grand Rapids and Indiana Railroad Depot
- U.S. National Register of Historic Places
- Location within Indiana Location within the United States
- Coordinates: 40.8290°N 84.9300°W
- Area: less than one acre
- Built: 1902–1903
- NRHP reference No.: 100000712
- Added to NRHP: March 6, 2017
Location

The Grand Rapids and Indiana Railroad Depot, also known as Pennsy Depot, is a former railway station in Decatur, Indiana. It was built by the Grand Rapids and Indiana Railroad between 1902 and 1903. It was later used by the Pennsylvania Railroad and saw passenger service until 1957. The depot continued to be utilized for freight until 1982. By 2015 the station building had fallen into disrepair and was rehabilitated over the following years to provide community space.

The property was added to the National Register of Historic Places on March 6, 2017.
