= Adams (dry fly) =

Fishing lure design

- Artificial fly
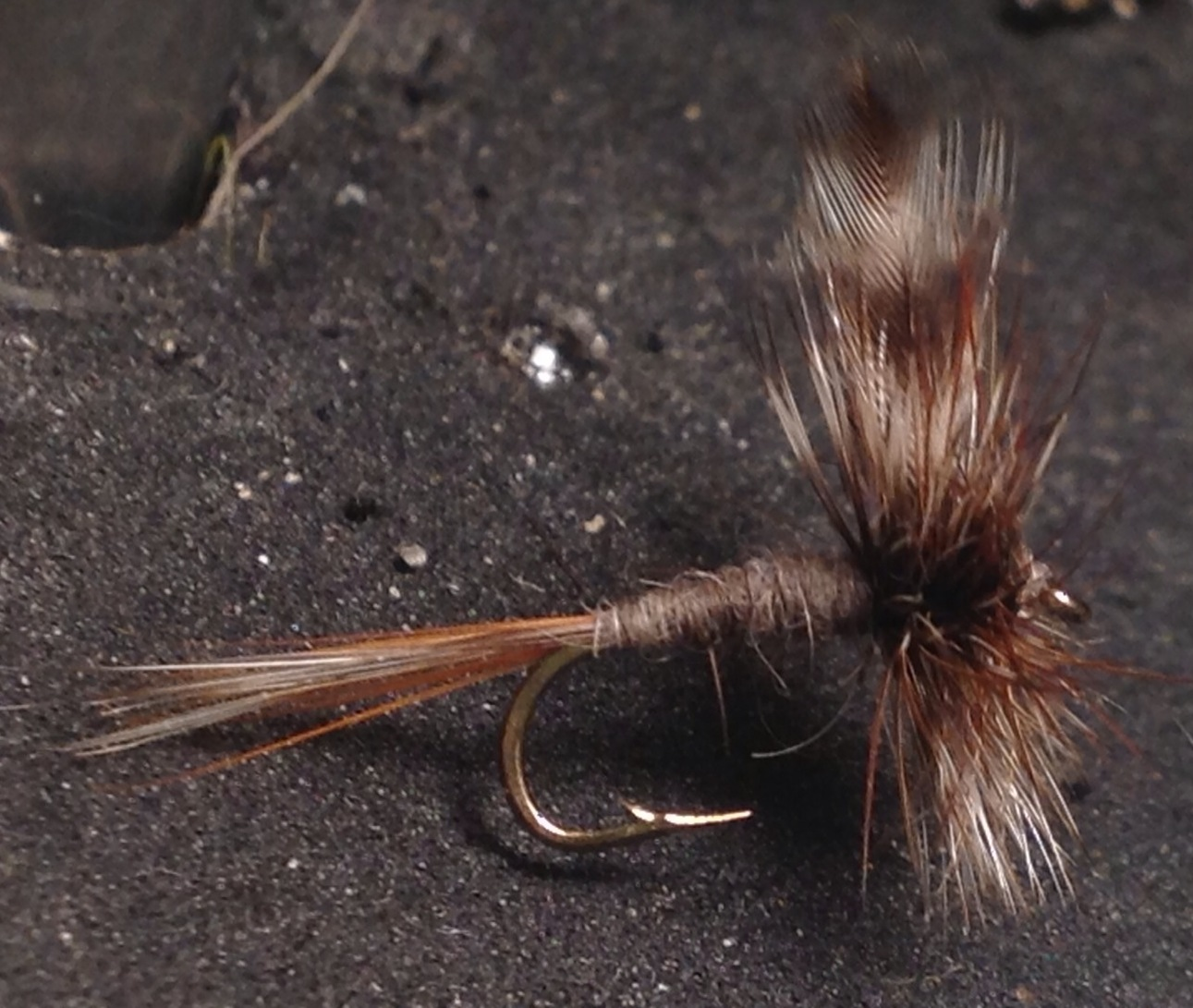
- Standard Adams
- Type: Dry fly
- Imitates: Searching pattern for caddis, mayflies and midges

History
- Creator: Leonard Dean Halladay
- Created: 1922
- Variations: Parachute Adams

Materials
- Typical sizes: 12-18, 1X fine
- Typical hooks: TMC 100, Mustad 94833, Daiichi 1100
- Thread: 6/0, 8/0 Black nylon
- Tail: Grizzly and brown hackle fibers mixed
- Body: Dark gray Muskrat fur dubbing
- Wing: Grizzly hen hackle tips
- Hackle: Brown and Grizzly mixed
- Head: Black thread

Uses
- Primary use: Trout
- Other uses: Panfish

Reference(s)
- Pattern references: Trout Flies-The Tier's Reference (1999) Hughes

The Adams is a traditional dry fly primarily used for trout. It is considered a general imitation of an adult mayfly, flying caddis or midge. It was designed by Leonard Halladay from Mayfield, Michigan in 1922, at the request of his friend Charles Adams. The Adams has been considered one of the most popular, versatile, effective and best selling dry flies since its creation.

== Origin ==
In 1922, Leonard Halladay, a Michigan fly tyer conceived the Adams as a general mayfly imitation. It was first fished by an Ohio attorney and friend of Halladay, Charles F. Adams on the Boardman River near Traverse City, Michigan. Charles Adams reported his success with the fly to Halladay, who named the fly after his friend. The small community of Mayfield, Michigan, bids itself as the "Birthplace of the Adams Fly".

== Materials ==
- Hook-dry fly hook (size 10-22)
- Thread-flat waxed nylon thread
- Hackle-dry fly hackles
- Tail-hackle fibers grizzly
- Abdomen-super fine dubbing
- Wing-grizzly hackle tips

== Variations ==
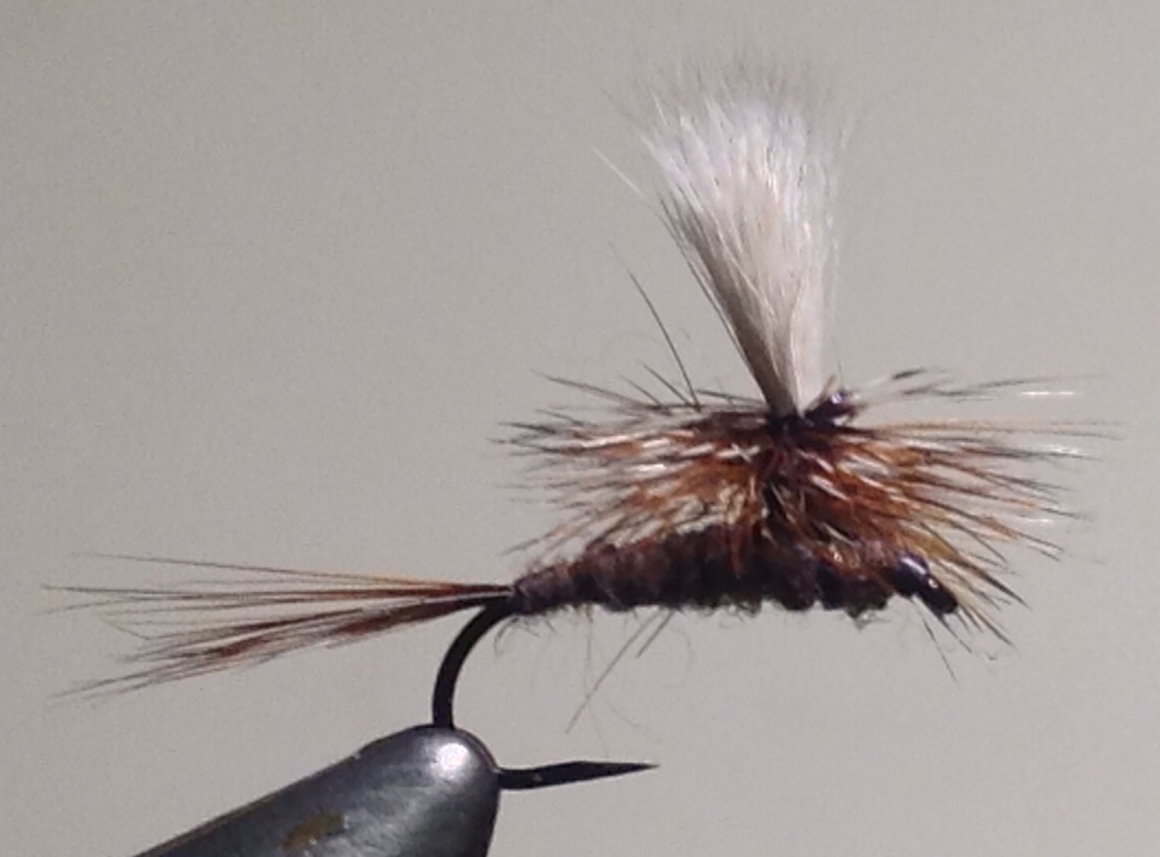
Parachute Adams

The Adams has been tied with a variety of materials and variations. The most common variation is the Parachute Adams where the hackle is tied parachute style around a wing base of white calf hair. The variation gives the fly greater buoyancy and visibility in rough water. Other variations include spentwings, downwings, females tied with a yellow body tag resembling an egg sac, hairwings, and with different tailing material such as elk, deer or moose.
