= Mayfield Township, Grand Traverse County, Michigan =

Mayfield Township, Michigan
- Civil township
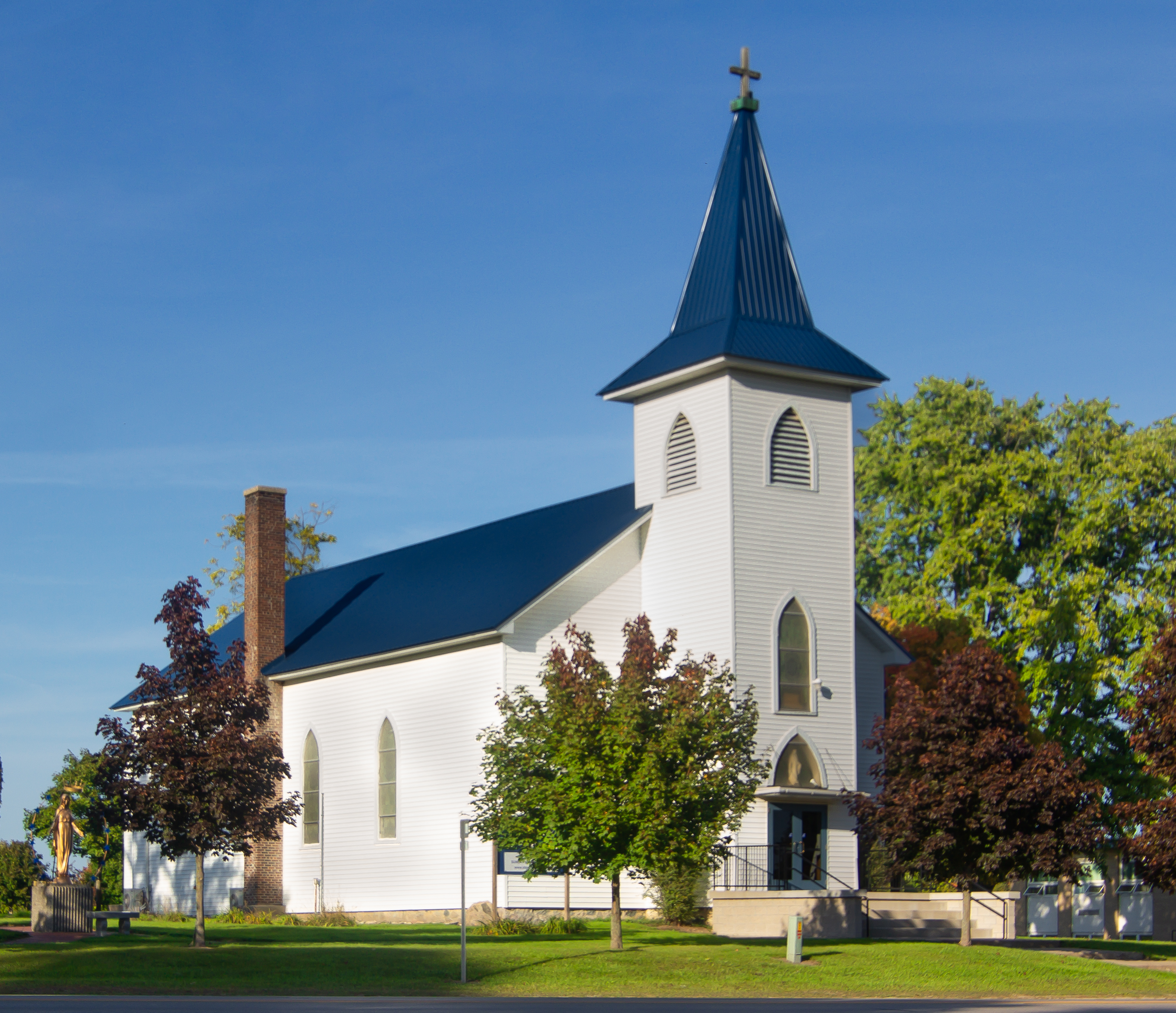
- St. Mary's Catholic Church in Hannah

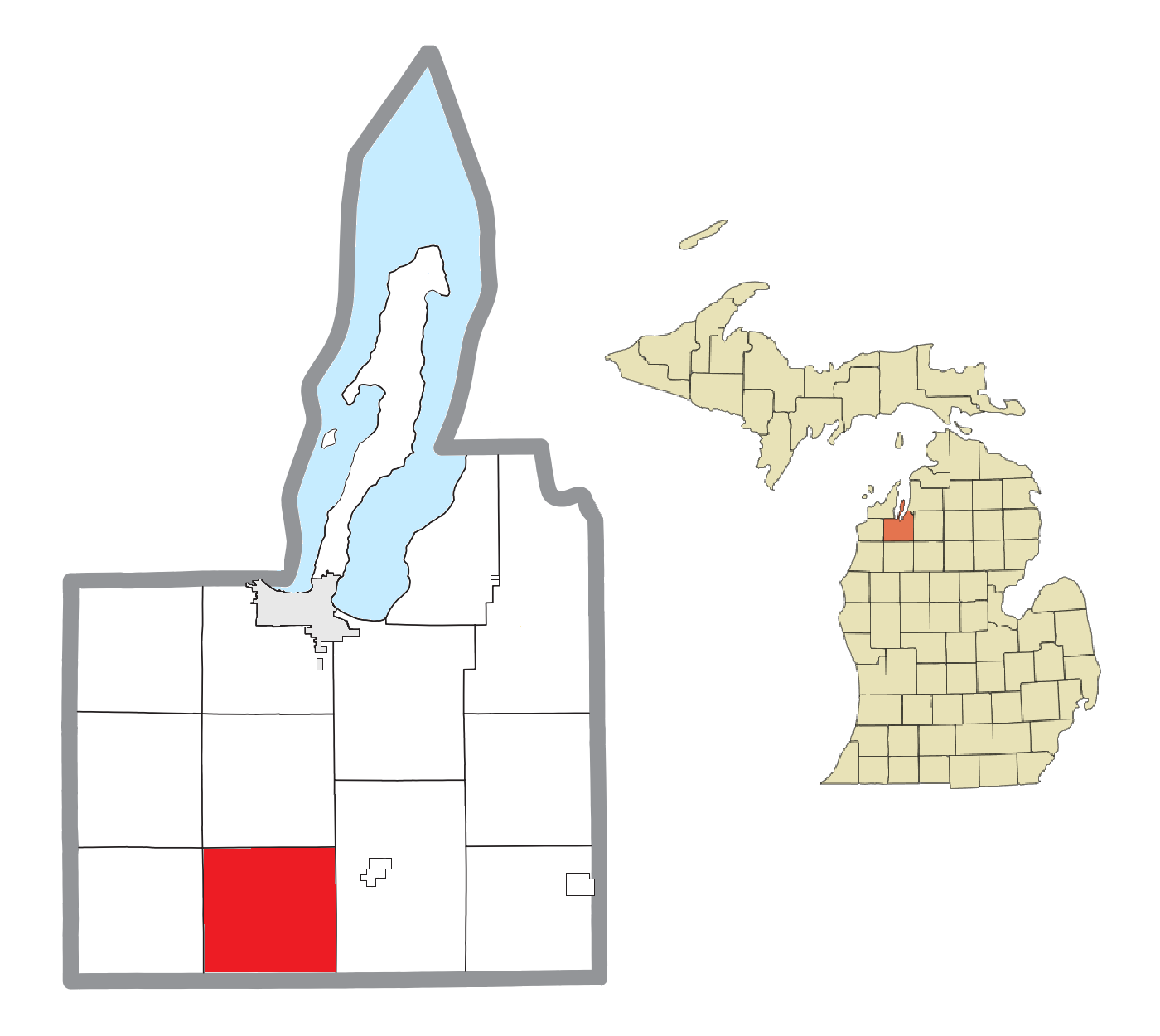
- Location within Grand Traverse County

- Location within the state of Michigan Mayfield Township (the United States)
- Coordinates: 44°32′37″N 85°39′03″W
- Country: United States
- State: Michigan
- County: Grand Traverse
- Organized: 1867

Government
  - Supervisor: John Ockert
  - Clerk: Stephanie Wolf

Area
  - Total: 36.1 sq mi (93.4 km^{2})
  - Land: 35.9 sq mi (93.0 km^{2})
  - Water: 0.15 sq mi (0.4 km^{2})
- Elevation: 1,096 ft (334 m)

Population (2020)
  - Total: 1,786
  - Density: 35/sq mi (13.7/km^{2})
- Time zone: UTC-5 (Eastern (EST))
  - Summer (DST): UTC-4 (EDT)
- ZIP code(s): 49620 (Buckley); 49637 (Grawn); 49649 (Kingsley)
- Area code: 231
- FIPS code: 26-52480
- GNIS feature ID: 1626712
- Website: http://mayfieldtwp.com/

Mayfield Township is a civil township of Grand Traverse County in the U.S. state of Michigan. The population was 1,786 at the 2020 census, an increase from 1,550 at the 2010 census.

There is community named Mayfield in Grand Traverse County, located several miles northeast of the township in adjacent Paradise Township.

== History ==
Mayfield Township was organized in November 1867 from part of Traverse Township.

== Geography ==
According to the United States Census Bureau, the township has a total area of 36.1 square miles (93.4 km^{2}), of which 35.9 square miles (93.0 km^{2}) is land and 0.2 square mile (0.4 km^{2}) (0.44%) is water.

Mayfield Township is located in the south of Grand Traverse County, and shares a boundary with Wexford County.

=== Major highways ===
- M-37 runs north-south through the heart of the township. The highway enters the south of the township from the village of Buckley, which straddles the Wexford county line. The highway continues due north for three miles, before entering a pair of 90 degree curves, and heading north again. The highway exits the township north into Blair Township, where it continues north into Traverse City and the Old Mission Peninsula
- M-113 begins at a junction with M-37 in the northwest of the township, before heading due east as a section line road. The highway travels for a few miles before entering Paradise Township, and running through Kingsley.

== Communities ==
- Bartlett was the site of a rural post office in Mayfield Township from 1879 until 1903.
- Hannah is a small community at 44°35′5.01″N 85°38′8.25″W. A post office at Hannah was established in 1881, operating until 1904. In 1885, a Catholic church was built in the community. The town takes its name from the Hannah Lay and Company, which conducted lumber operations in Grand Traverse County. The company's founder was Perry Hannah, who later became the first mayor of Traverse City. Today, Hannah remains the location of a catholic school and parish. Hannah is the site of marker 22 of the Old Indian Trail.
- Immediately south of the Mayfield Township line lies the village of Buckley in Wexford County.
- Just east of Mayfield Township lies the village of Kingsley.
- The city of Traverse City is about 12 miles (19 km) north of Mayfield Township.

== Demographics ==
As of the census of 2000, there were 1,271 people, 439 households, and 338 families residing in the township. The population density was 35.4 inhabitants per square mile (13.7/km^{2}). There were 480 housing units at an average density of 13.4 per square mile (5.2/km^{2}). The racial makeup of the township was 97.88% White, 0.39% African American, 0.79% Native American, 0.08% Asian, 0.08% Pacific Islander, and 0.79% from two or more races. Hispanic or Latino of any race were 0.47% of the population.

There were 439 households, out of which 36.7% had children under the age of 18 living with them, 64.2% were married couples living together, 10.3% had a female householder with no husband present, and 22.8% were non-families. 17.8% of all households were made up of individuals, and 4.8% had someone living alone who was 65 years of age or older. The average household size was 2.88 and the average family size was 3.20.

In the township the population was spread out, with 29.3% under the age of 18, 8.3% from 18 to 24, 31.0% from 25 to 44, 22.5% from 45 to 64, and 8.8% who were 65 years of age or older. The median age was 34 years. For every 100 females, there were 108.4 males. For every 100 females age 18 and over, there were 103.6 males.

The median income for a household in the township was $40,820, and the median income for a family was $44,464. Males had a median income of $31,250 versus $19,844 for females. The per capita income for the township was $15,755. About 6.5% of families and 8.4% of the population were below the poverty line, including 7.0% of those under age 18 and 9.9% of those age 65 or over.
