= Kingsley, Michigan =

- Village
- Village of Kingsley
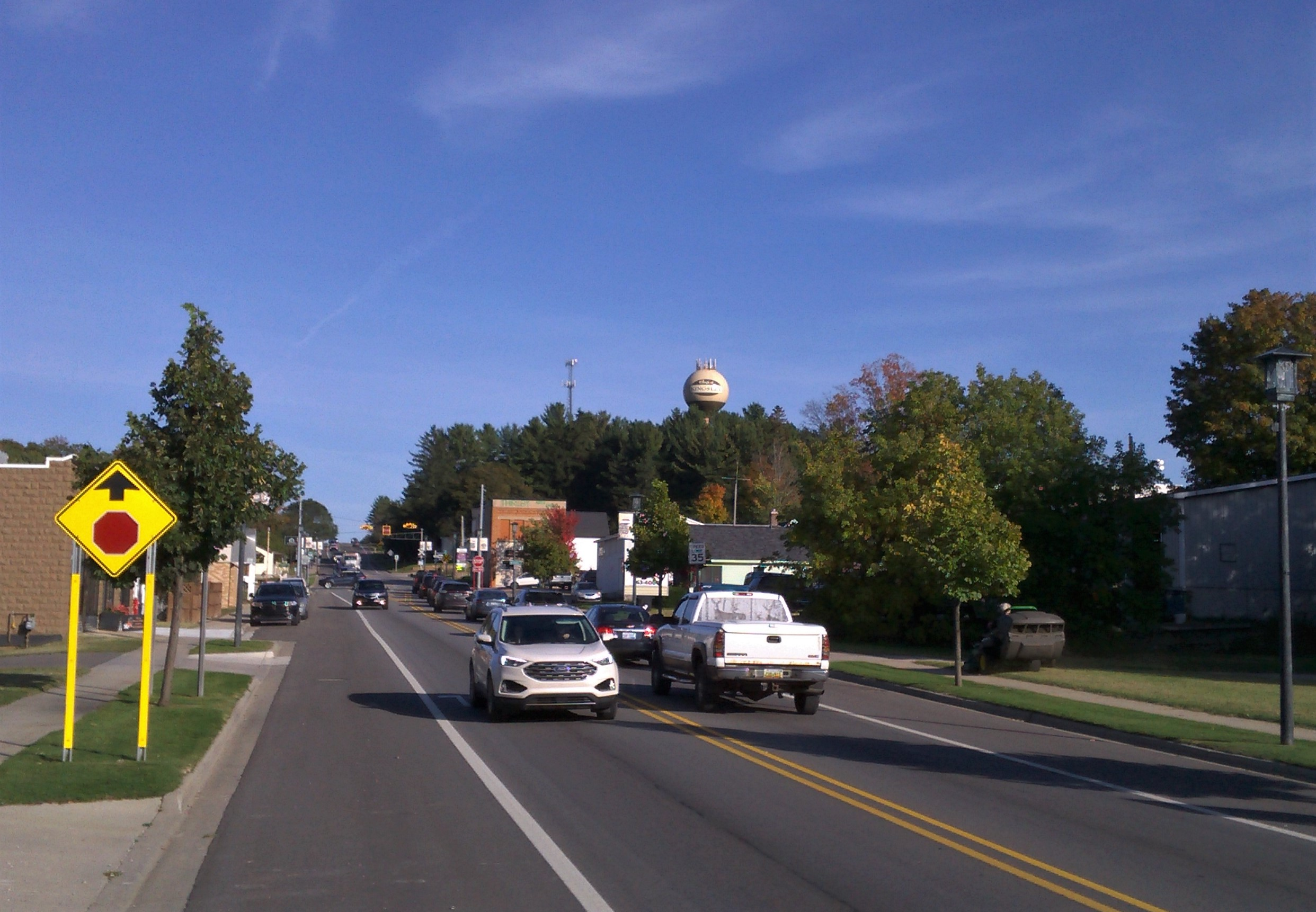
- Downtown Kingsley along Main Street

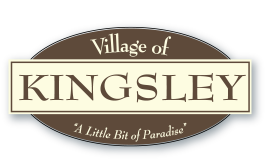
- Nickname: Stagtown
- Motto: "A Little Bit of Paradise"
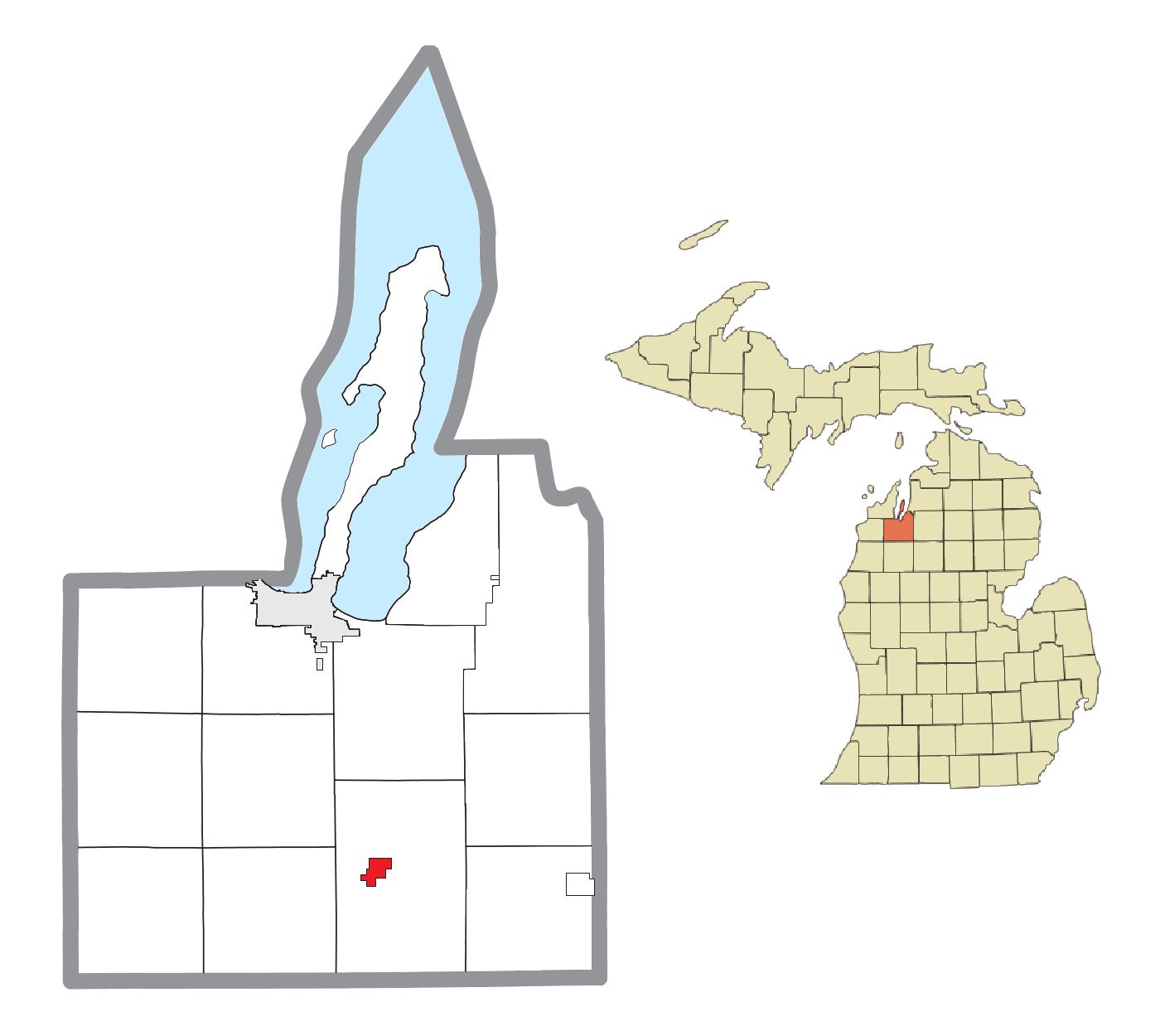
- Location within Grand Traverse County

- Location within the state of Michigan
- Coordinates: 44°35′03″N 85°32′14″W
- Country: United States
- State: Michigan
- County: Grand Traverse
- Township: Paradise

Government
  - President: Mary Lajko
  - Manager: Charlie Jetter

Area
  - Total: 1.22 sq mi (3.17 km^{2})
  - Land: 1.22 sq mi (3.15 km^{2})
  - Water: 0.0039 sq mi (0.01 km^{2})
- Elevation: 968 ft (295 m)

Population (2020)
  - Total: 1,431
  - Density: 1,176.4/sq mi (454.22/km^{2})
- Time zone: UTC-5 (Eastern (EST))
  - Summer (DST): UTC-4 (EDT)
- ZIP code(s): 49649
- Area code: 231
- FIPS code: 26-43340
- GNIS feature ID: 0629725
- Website: www.villageofkingsley.com

Kingsley (/kɪŋzli/) is a village in Grand Traverse County in the U.S. state of Michigan. The population was 1,431 at the 2020 census. The village is located within Paradise Township and is part of the Traverse City metropolitan area.

== History ==
The land Kingsley sits on today was originally owned by its founders, Judson Kingsley and Myron S. Brownson. In 1872, the Pennsylvania Railroad was completed between Cadillac and Traverse City. Kingsley built a station for the new railroad, which happened to run through his property. Kingsley also opened a post office, known as Kingsley Station. In 1876, Judson Kingsley platted Kingsley Station as a new village under the shortened name of Kingsley.

In 1874, Brownson, a practicing medic from Steuben County, New York, bought land adjacent to that of Kingsley. In July 1882, Brownson platted his land into a new settlement he called Paradise. In 1893, the villages of Kingsley and Paradise united and incorporated under the name of Kingsley.

== Geography ==
According to the United States Census Bureau, the village has a total area of 1.44 square miles (3.73 km^{2}), of which 1.42 square miles (3.68 km^{2}) is land and 0.02 square miles (0.05 km^{2}) is water. The Kingsley ZIP code, 49649, serves the majority of Paradise Township, as well as the southwest corner of Union Township, the western portion of Fife Lake Township, a portion of northern Greenwood Township, the northeast corner of Hanover Township, a large portion of eastern Mayfield Township, and the southeast corner of Blair Township.

== Government ==
The village president of Kingsley is Mary Lajko, who has served since 2022. The president pro tempore is Eric Weger, and village trustees are Whitney Specker, Chris Bott, Chris McPherson, Dawn Willman, and Christina Forro. The village manager is Charlie Jetter.

== Demographics ==
Historical population
Census	Pop.	Note	%±
1900	419		—
1910	497		18.6%
1920	350		−29.6%
1930	302		−13.7%
1940	385		27.5%
1950	425		10.4%
1960	586		37.9%
1970	632		7.8%
1980	664		5.1%
1990	738		11.1%
2000	1,469		99.1%
2010	1,480		0.7%
2020	1,431		−3.3%
U.S. Decennial Census

== 2020 census ==
As of the census of 2020, there were 1,431 people, 514 households and 604 total housing units in the village. The racial makeup of the village was 1.1% Native Wmerican, 0.3% Asian, 0.4% Black or African, 3.2% Hispanic or Latino, 0.2% another race, 92.5% white and 5.3% two or more races.

There were 514 households of which 7.7% had children under the age of 18 living with them, 55.6% were married couples living together, 24.5% had a female householder with no husband present, 8.0%had a male householder with no wife present. 31.8% have not been married. The average family size is 4.35

The median age for the village was 28.7 years. 660 residents are under the age of 19; 128 residents were between 20 and 29; 326 residents were between 30 and 39; 139 residents were between 40 and 49; 156 residents were between 50 and 59. Finally, 253 residents were 60 to over 85 years old. The gender makeup of the village is 54.8% male and 45.2% female.

=== 2010 census ===
As of the census of 2010, there were 1,480 people, 519 households, and 380 families living in the village. The population density was 1,042.3 inhabitants per square mile (402.4/km^{2}). There were 568 housing units at an average density of 400.0 per square mile (154.4/km^{2}). The racial makeup of the village was 95.6% White, 0.7% African American, 1.1% Native American, 0.1% Asian, 0.2% Pacific Islander, 0.1% from other races, and 2.2% from two or more races. Hispanic or Latino of any race were 2.4% of the population.

There were 519 households, of which 45.3% had children under the age of 18 living with them, 48.7% were married couples living together, 17.1% had a female householder with no husband present, 7.3% had a male householder with no wife present, and 26.8% were non-families. 21.4% of all households were made up of individuals, and 8.1% had someone living alone who was 65 years of age or older. The average household size was 2.83 and the average family size was 3.26.

The median age in the village was 32.6 years. 31.4% of residents were under the age of 18; 9.2% were between the ages of 18 and 24; 27.7% were from 25 to 44; 22.1% were from 45 to 64; and 9.5% were 65 years of age or older. The gender makeup of the village was 48.1% male and 51.9% female.

=== 2000 census ===
As of the census of 2000, there were 1,469 people, 501 households, and 375 families living in the village. The population density was 1,324.8 inhabitants per square mile (511.5/km^{2}). There were 524 housing units at an average density of 472.6 per square mile (182.5/km^{2}). The racial makeup of the village was 97.28% White, 0.27% African American, 0.82% Native American, 0.75% from other races, and 0.88% from two or more races. Hispanic or Latino of any race were 1.77% of the population.

There were 501 households, out of which 47.5% had children under the age of 18 living with them, 56.3% were married couples living together, 15.0% had a female householder with no husband present, and 25.1% were non-families. 19.0% of all households were made up of individuals, and 6.6% had someone living alone who was 65 years of age or older. The average household size was 2.90 and the average family size was 3.31.

In the village, the population was spread out, with 33.9% under the age of 18, 9.9% from 18 to 24, 33.6% from 25 to 44, 15.5% from 45 to 64, and 7.1% who were 65 years of age or older. The median age was 28 years. For every 100 females, there were 88.1 males. For every 100 females age 18 and over, there were 90.4 males.

The median income for a household in the village was $40,229, and the median income for a family was undetermined. Males had a median income of more than females. The per capita income for the village was $16,508. About 17.3% of the population were below the poverty line.

== Climate ==
This climatic region has large seasonal temperature differences, with warm to hot (and often humid) summers and cold (sometimes severely cold) winters. According to the Köppen Climate Classification system, Kingsley has a humid continental climate, abbreviated "Dfb" on climate maps.

Climate data for Kingsley, Michigan
Month	Jan	Feb	Mar	Apr	May	Jun	Jul	Aug	Sep	Oct	Nov	Dec	Year
Mean daily maximum °C (°F)	−2 (29)	0 (32)	6 (43)	14 (57)	21 (69)	26 (78)	28 (82)	26 (79)	22 (72)	15 (59)	7 (45)	1 (33)	13 (56)
Mean daily minimum °C (°F)	−11 (12)	−8 (17)	−6 (21)	0 (32)	6 (43)	11 (52)	14 (57)	13 (56)	9 (49)	3 (38)	−2 (29)	−7 (19)	2 (35)
Average precipitation cm (inches)	5.1 (2)	3.8 (1.5)	5.8 (2.3)	7.4 (2.9)	7.9 (3.1)	8.6 (3.4)	7.6 (3)	9.1 (3.6)	9.4 (3.7)	9.1 (3.6)	7.1 (2.8)	6.1 (2.4)	87 (34.4)
Source: Weatherbase

== Education ==
Kingsley is served by the Kingsley Area Schools district with Kingsley Elementary, Kingsley Middle, and Kingsley High schools. Kingsley's sports teams are known as the "Stags", and their official colors are orange and black. The orange and black motif can be seen adorning buildings throughout the village.

== Recreation/community ==
Kingsley is home to a variety of different businesses and stores that make up the town. Types of businesses found in Kingsley include Adult and Child care, Health care, Dental care, Restaurants, Automotive, Construction, Beauty, and fitness.

Brownson Memorial Park is located in Kingsley. The park amenities include barbecue grills, seating, a splash pad and a band shell used for public speaking and music festivals. The park previously included a playground that was removed to build a bigger one with a million dollar grant. The park also hosts a farmers market which has live music, vendors, as well as a free do-it-yourself workshop.

Another park in Kingsley is Civic Center South. The Civic Center has baseball and soccer fields, tennis and basketball courts, a skating rink, a pavilion and two eighteen hole disc golf courses.

== Transportation ==
The nearest airport to Kingsley with commercial service is Traverse City's Cherry Capital Airport. This airport offers year-round service to Detroit and Chicago–O'Hare, as well as seasonal service to a number of additional locations.

Kingsley was formerly a station on the Grand Rapids and Indiana Railroad. It is served by the Great Lakes Central Railroad, however, Kingsley is no longer a station.

M-113 runs east–west through downtown Kingsley as Main Street. M-113 serves as a connector between US 131 and M-37, two major north–south routes. East of Kingsley, M-113 has a junction with the shorter M-186, another short east–west route that can be used to access Fife Lake.
