= Grand Rapids and Indiana Railroad =

Former railway line in Michigan and Indiana, US

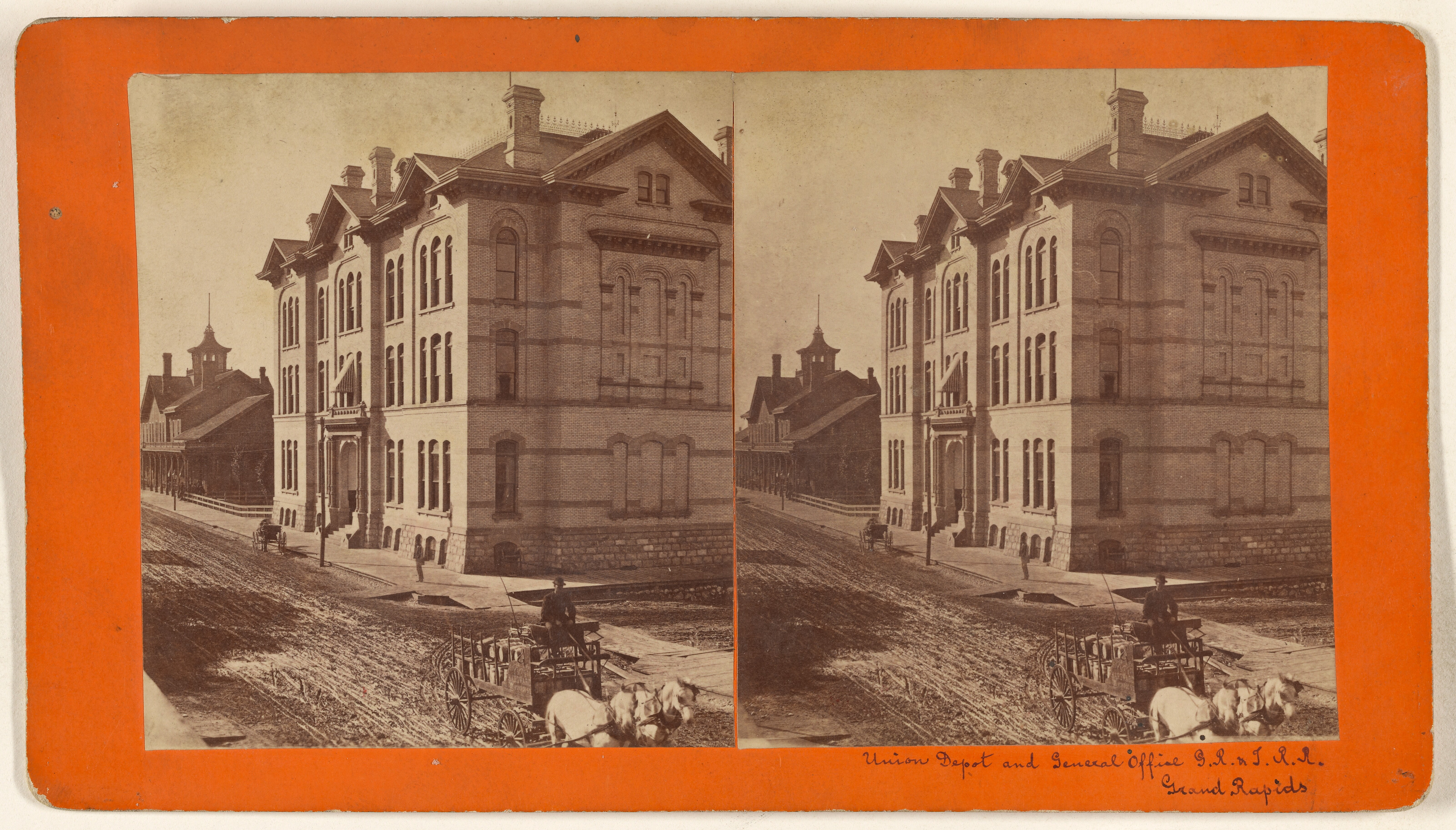
- Union Depot and General Office G.R. & I.R.R., Grand Rapids, Mich. (stereoview by Schuyler C. Baldwin)

Overview
- Locale: Michigan and Indiana
- Dates of operation: 1854–1953
- Successor: Pennsylvania Railroad (1921)

Technical
- Track gauge: 4 ft 8 1/2 in (1,435 mm) standard gauge

The Grand Rapids and Indiana Railroad at its height provided passenger and freight railroad services between Cincinnati, Ohio, and the Straits of Mackinac in Michigan, USA. The company was formed on January 18, 1854.

== Beginnings ==
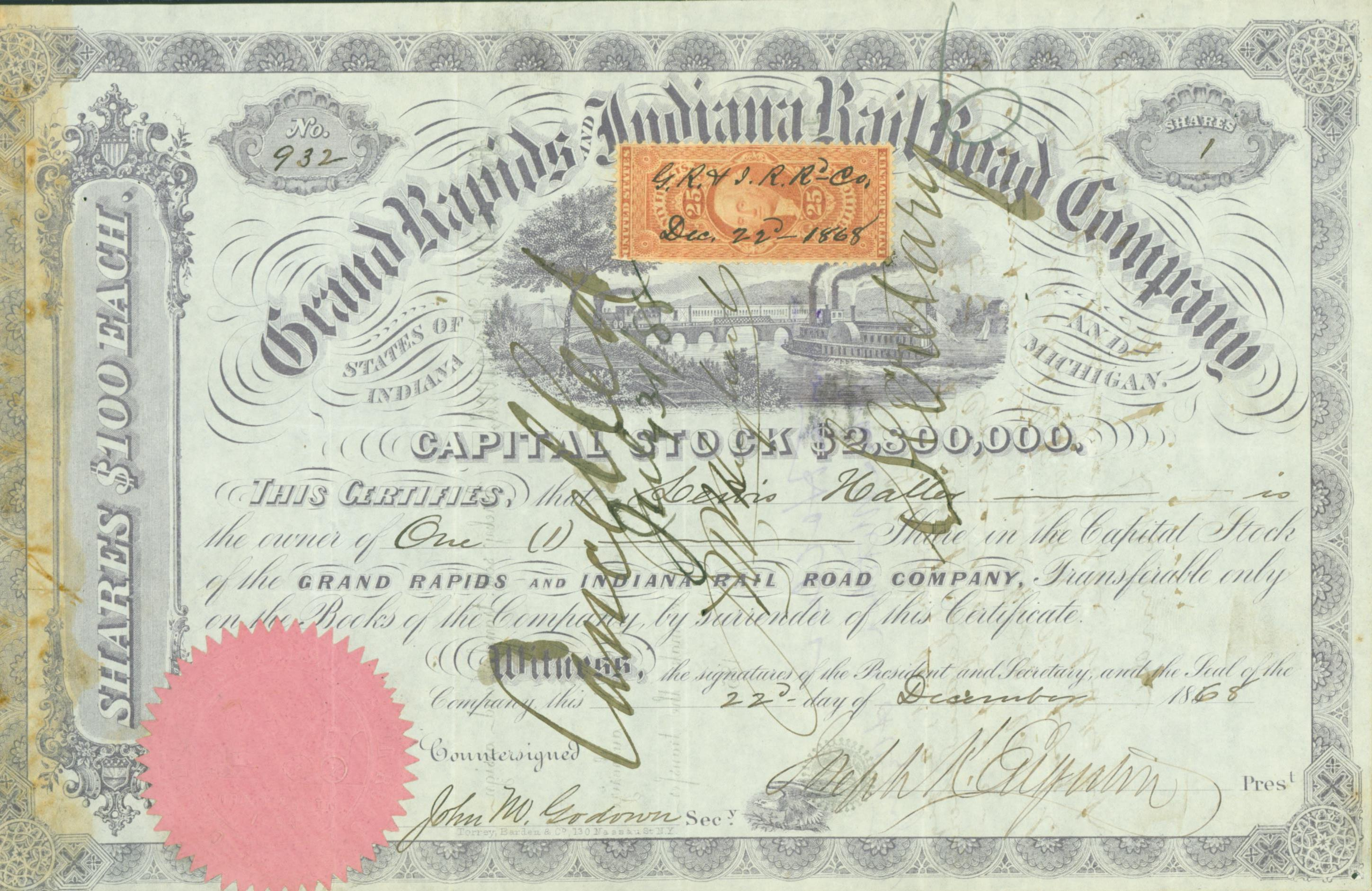
Share of the Grand Rapids & Indiana Railroad, issued 22. December 1868

After grappling with financial difficulties for many years, the company opened service between Bridge Street in Grand Rapids to Cedar Springs, Michigan, on December 25, 1867, a distance of about 20 miles (32 km).

The gross earnings of the railroad in 1867 were about $22,700. In July 1868 it had 2 engines in service: the Pioneer and the Muskegon. At that time the company also utilized a single passenger coach and single baggage car, six box cars, 24 flat cars and five hand cars.

By 1869 the railroad was again in trouble with its creditors, and the courts appointed a receiver, Jesse L. Williams of Fort Wayne, Indiana, to control the company. Under Williams' direction the Continental Improvement Company was hired on May 1, 1869, to complete the line between Fort Wayne and Little Traverse Bay in Michigan. Fifty-one days later, on June 21, 1869, the Continental Improvement Company had laid the last rail connecting Cedar Springs to Morley, Michigan. Williams was discharged as receiver on June 20, 1871.

== Expansion ==
Map showing the Grand Rapids & Indiana Railroad, and its connections. Published 1871

The track from the south into Grand Rapids was completed September 13, 1870. The line extended north to Big Rapids, Michigan, by October 1, 1870, and a train first traveled between Fort Wayne and Big Rapids on that date.

In June 1871, the Grand Rapids and Indiana Railroad Company took control of the road and property of the Cincinnati, Richmond and Fort Wayne Railroad Company, extending the line south to Cincinnati.

The Traverse City Rail Road Company, a branch providing service between Walton Junction on the main line to Traverse City, was completed in December 1872, bringing a wave of immigration to that area. This branch offered service to Traverse City, Northport and many towns between by 1909.

The line between Paris and Petoskey, Michigan, was completed November 25, 1873. The road was opened to Mackinaw City, Michigan, and the Straits of Mackinac on July 3, 1882. The total length of the line at this time was 529 miles (851 km).

In 1886 the company added an "airline" branch from Grand Rapids to Muskegon, Michigan, allowing travel between the two cities in about 1 hour.

As of July 1888, the railroad had expanded its fleet to 66 locomotives and 3,100 cars. Its gross earnings were close to $2.3 million in 1887.

In 1891 the Grand Rapids and Indiana Railroad featured the longest north–south line in the country. The railroad served to accelerate the settlement of Northern Michigan, which was largely a wilderness in the mid-19th century.

On July 2, 1896, the Grand Rapids & Indiana Railroad reorganized as the Grand Rapids and Indiana Railway.

== Lumber to tourism ==
GR&I Advertising Poster with map and schedule

During the last quarter of the 19th century, Northern Michigan had few residents, but the railroad netted a profit of over $300,000 as early as 1876. Most of the profit came from hauling lumber from northern Michigan south. The 244,000 tons of lumber hauled in 1876 represented 70 percent of the railroad's freight business for that year, and shipping forest products remained the main source of business for the railroad for the next decade.

By the late 1880s the forests were depleted and the railroad began to depend more on tourist business. Even before completing the line to Mackinac City, the railroad marketed itself as "The Fishing Line" and published tourist guides advertising the fishing opportunities and resorts along its line.

In 1886 the Grand Rapids & Indiana joined with the Michigan Central Railroad, which had built its own line into Mackinaw City in 1881 and the Detroit and Cleveland Navigation Company to form the Mackinac Island Hotel Company. This new company built the Grand Hotel on Mackinac Island, which opened in 1887.

== Decline ==
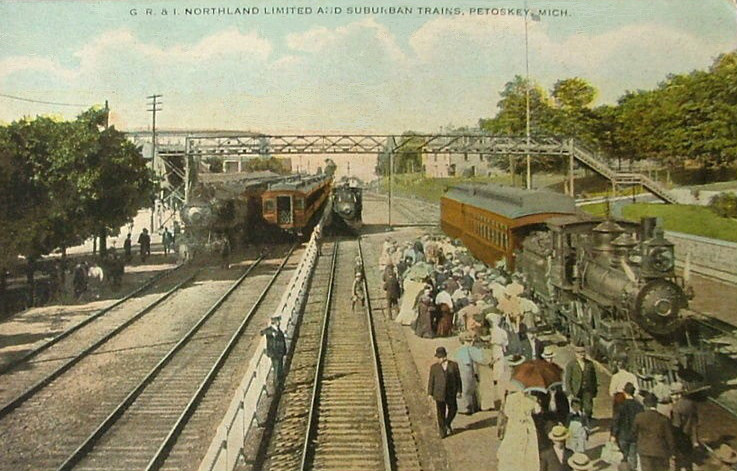
the Northland Limited in Petoskey, Michigan

By 1907 four passenger trains were running north to and from Mackinaw City daily. Passenger train fares were not enough to support the railroad and ridership declined. In 1909 the railroad reported a profit of 24.4 cents for every passenger for each mile carried; by 1921 the railroad was losing 19.5 cents per passenger mile.

The Grand Rapids and Indiana Railroad was bought by the Pennsylvania Railroad in 1918. For several decades in the 20th century, ending in 1961, the PRR operated the Northern Arrow (Mackinaw City—Cincinnati) on much of the route.

In 1975 the Michigan Department of Transportation bought the railroad and it largely ceased operation in 1984, although the portion of track from Cadillac north to Petoskey is operated by Great Lakes Central Railroad.

The Michigan Northern Railway also operated some of the GR&I system until the mid-1980s in northern Michigan.

During the 1990s much of the old railroad right of way between the north side of Grand Rapids and Cadillac, Michigan, was turned into the White Pine Trail State Park.

A portion of the old railroad right of way just north of Vicksburg is part of the Vicksburg Trailway from Towline Ave to East TU Ave. The portion of the right of way south of Kalamazoo is still in service as a Watco Grand Elk Railroad spur serving Pfizer portage plant. The portion of the right of way north of Kalamazoo is still in service as a Watco Grand Elk Railroad spur serving Graphic Packaging Inc. Additionally Watco Grand Elk operates on the portion between Kalamazoo and Grand Rapids.

== See also ==
- Decatur station (Pennsylvania Railroad) — Decatur, IN depot added to the National Register of Historic Places
- Harbor Springs station
- Porter Hollow Embankment and Culvert
