= Traverse City Railroad =

Overview
- Locale: Michigan
- Dates of operation: 1872–1917
- Successor: Grand Rapids and Indiana Railway

Technical
- Track gauge: 4 ft 8 1/2 in (1,435 mm) standard gauge
- Length: 26 miles

The Traverse City Railroad was the owner of a branch railroad from Walton Junction, Michigan, to Traverse City. The line was built in 1872, and connected with the Grand Rapids and Indiana Railway, to which it was sold in 1917.
