= Leland Township, Michigan =

- Civil township
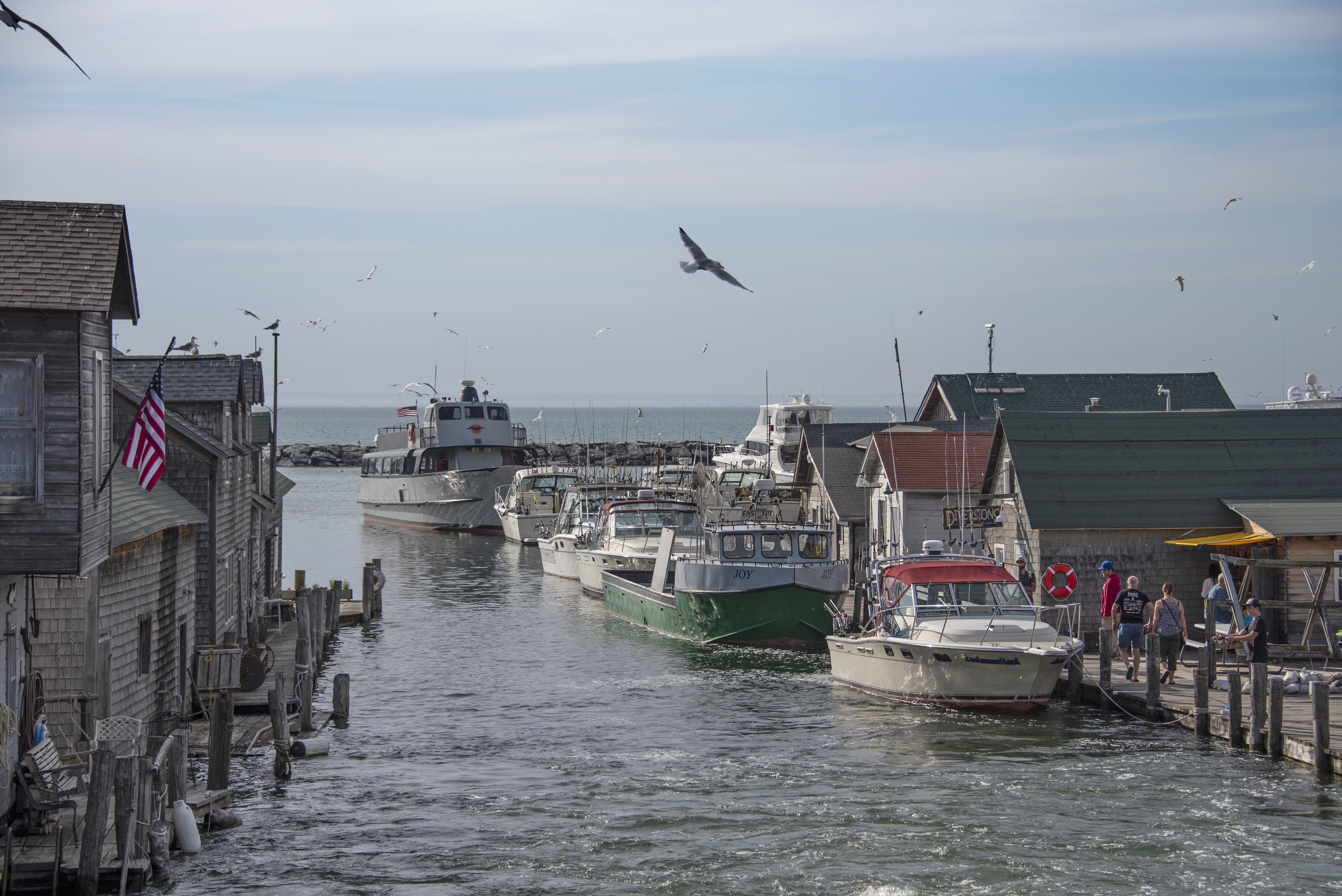
- Historic Fishtown along the Leland River

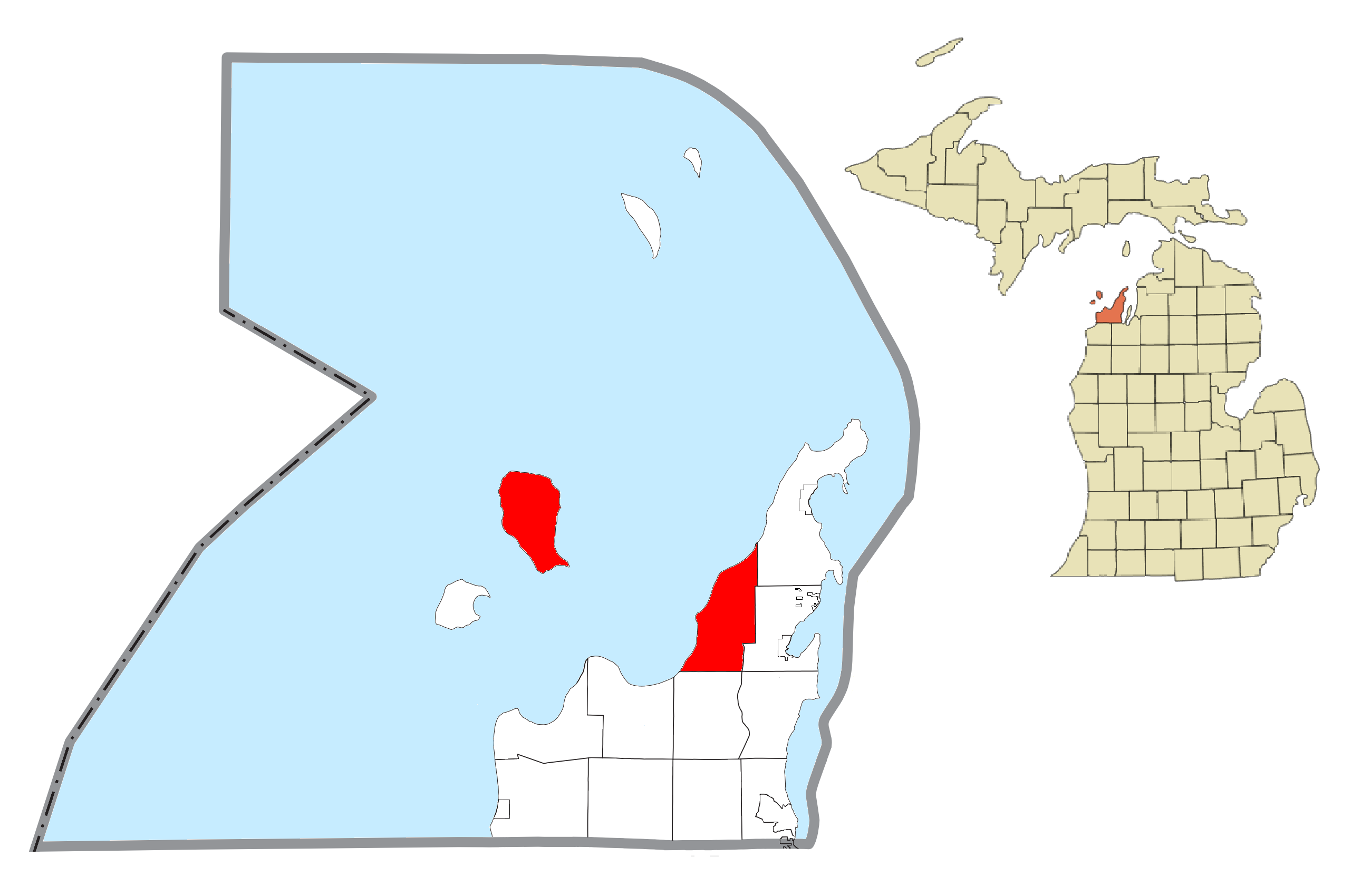
- Location within Leelanau County

- Location within the state of Michigan Leland Township (the United States)
- Coordinates: 45°00′54″N 85°44′11″W
- Country: United States
- State: Michigan
- County: Leelanau

Government
  - Type: Commission
  - Supervisor: Cal Little

Area
  - Total: 146.5 sq mi (379.4 km^{2})
  - Land: 45.6 sq mi (118.1 km^{2})
  - Water: 100.9 sq mi (261.3 km^{2})
- Elevation: 581 ft (177 m)

Population (2020)
  - Total: 2,126
  - Density: 45/sq mi (17.2/km^{2})
- Time zone: UTC-5 (Eastern (EST))
  - Summer (DST): UTC-4 (EDT)
- ZIP code(s): 49653 (Lake Leelanau); 49654 (Leland); 49670 (Northport)
- Area code: 231
- FIPS code: 26089
- GNIS feature ID: 1626603

Leland Township is a civil township of Leelanau County in the U.S. state of Michigan. As of the early 2000s, the unincorporated community of Leland, which lies totally within the township, was the county seat of Leelanau County. However, county voters on August 3, 2004, approved a proposal to build a new governmental center in adjacent Suttons Bay Township; the move to the new facility was completed in 2008. As of the 2020 census, Leland Township population was 2,126.

North Manitou Island is politically part of Leland Township.

== Communities ==
- Crescent is a ghost town on North Manitou Island. The community was settled in 1906, and was largely abandoned shortly thereafter.
- Leland, formerly the county seat, is an unincorporated community within the township, situated on M-22 at 45°01′23″N 85°45′35″W. Leland has ferry service to both North and South Manitou Island.
- Lake Leelanau is an unincorporated community situated on the "Narrows" between North and South Lake Leelanau; Michigan highway M-204 crosses the Narrows here. The community is at 44°58′51″N 85°42′54″W.
- North Manitou Island Village is a historic settlement on North Manitou Island. The community, located on the eastern shore of the island, was settled in the 1850s. The village became home to a U.S. Lifesaving Station in 1871. In 1984, the village came under jurisdiction of the National Park Service, and is historically preserved.

== Geography ==
According to the United States Census Bureau, the township has a total area of 146.5 square miles (379 km^{2}), of which 45.6 square miles (118 km^{2}) is land and 100.9 square miles (261 km^{2}) (68.87%) is water. The uninhabited North Manitou Island is located within Leland Township.

=== Major highways ===
- M-22 runs north–south along the shore of Lake Michigan. The highway passes through Leland.
- M-204 is an east–west route that runs through the south of the township. The highway runs through the community of Lake Leelanau, and crosses the lake of the same name. The highway terminates in nearby Suttons Bay, traversing the Leelanau Peninsula.

== Demographics ==
As of the census of 2000, there were 2,033 people, 818 households, and 589 families residing in the township. The population density was 44.6 inhabitants per square mile (17.2/km^{2}). There were 1,550 housing units at an average density of 34.0 per square mile (13.1/km^{2}). The racial makeup of the township was 93.90% White, 0.69% African American, 0.64% Native American, 0.25% Asian, 0.10% Pacific Islander, 3.49% from other races, and 0.93% from two or more races. Hispanic or Latino of any race were 6.10% of the population.

There were 818 households, out of which 24.3% had children under the age of 18 living with them, 63.9% were married couples living together, 6.4% had a female householder with no husband present, and 27.9% were non-families. 24.1% of all households were made up of individuals, and 11.4% had someone living alone who was 65 years of age or older. The average household size was 2.40 and the average family size was 2.81.

In the township the population was spread out, with 22.5% under the age of 18, 6.1% from 18 to 24, 21.5% from 25 to 44, 28.0% from 45 to 64, and 21.8% who were 65 years of age or older. The median age was 45 years. For every 100 females, there were 97.8 males. For every 100 females age 18 and over, there were 95.9 males.

The median income for a household in the township was $46,629, and the median income for a family was $55,714. Males had a median income of $32,206 versus $24,231 for females. The per capita income for the township was $27,556. About 1.7% of families and 3.2% of the population were below the poverty line, including 2.7% of those under age 18 and 2.4% of those age 65 or over.
