= Fountain Point Resort =

Historic house in Michigan, United States

- U.S. National Register of Historic Places
- Michigan State Historic Site
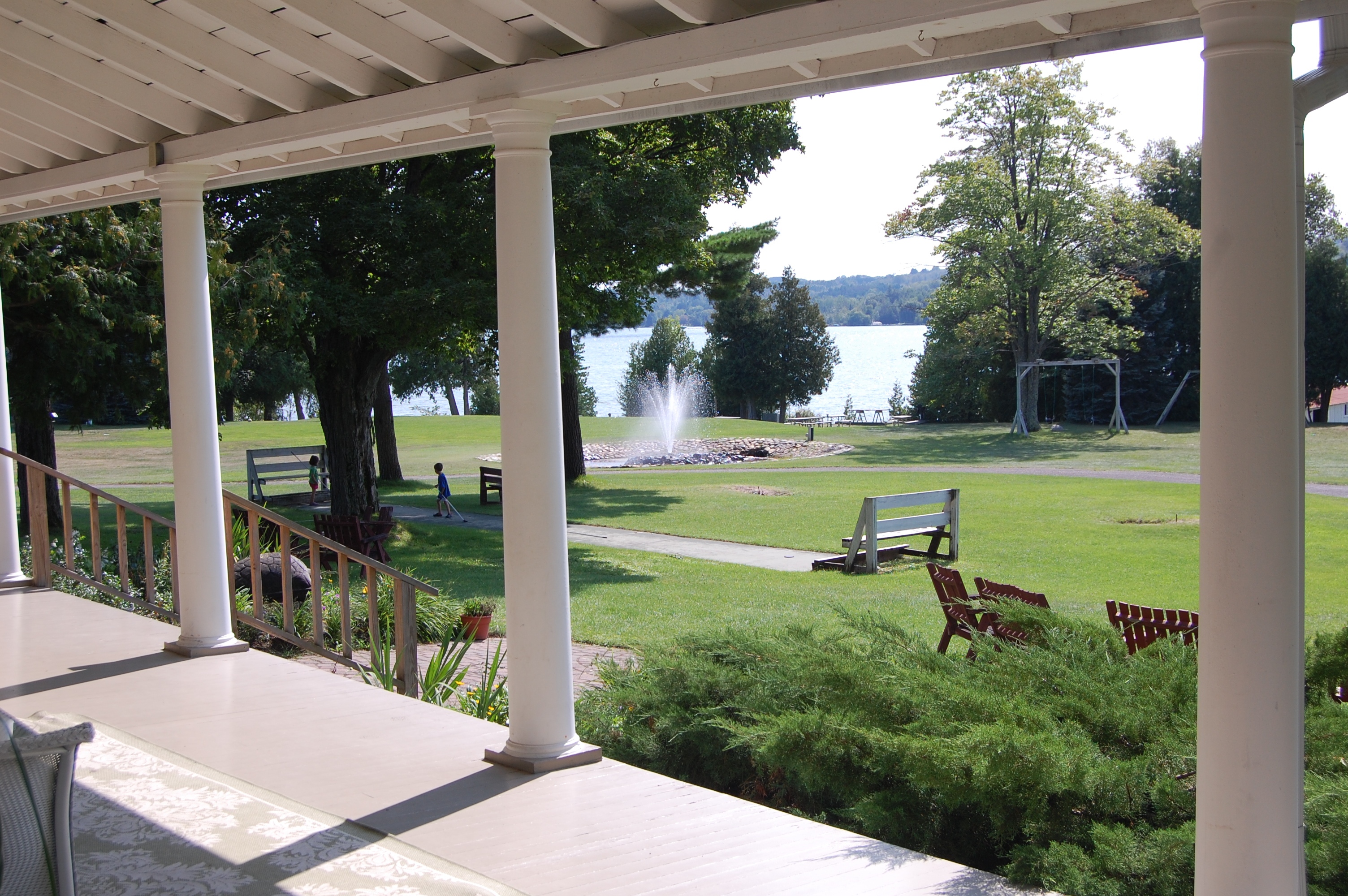
- View of the fountain from the porch of Fountain Point Resort
- Interactive map
- Location: 990 South Lake Leelanau Drive; Suttons Bay Township, Michigan
- Coordinates: 44.96808°N 85.70726°W
- Built: 1889
- Architectural style: Late Victorian, Bungalow/craftsman
- NRHP reference No.: 03000623

Significant dates
- Added to NRHP: July 10, 2003
- Designated MSHS: August 15, 1975

Fountain Point Resort is a historic landmark located on the eastern shore of South Lake Leelanau in Suttons Bay Township, Michigan. Its name is derived from a fountain of sparkling artesian spring water, situated on a large point on Lake Leelanau, which has been continuously gushing since 1867.

== History ==
Circa 1860, a French fur trader, Aymar de Belloy, was plying his trade near the narrows of Carp Lake and became convinced of the beauty and bounty of the area and purchased a parcel of land.

He attempted drilling for oil, and after a long struggle in 1867 he struck a gusher of sparkling water at a depth of 900 feet (270 m). Following de Belloy's disappointment over his failure to strike oil, the land changed hands several times until 1887, when it was purchased by Lydia Morrison of Cincinnati, Ohio. In June 1889, she established "The Fountain Point House," a Victorian-style mansion, and guests began arriving for the summer by steamboat and buggy. The main three-story building was the center of activity, and it included a large dining room, kitchen and lounge.

By 1903, the Traverse City, Leelanau, and Manistique Railroad began operating between Traverse City and Northport, stopping at Fountain Point, improving transportation of people and products.

Over the years, several cottages were built, and Fountain Point Resort has become a tourism destination featuring local history and family activities.

In 1975, Fountain Point Resort was listed on the State of Michigan historic registry, and in 2003 it was placed on the National Register of Historic Places.

== Today ==
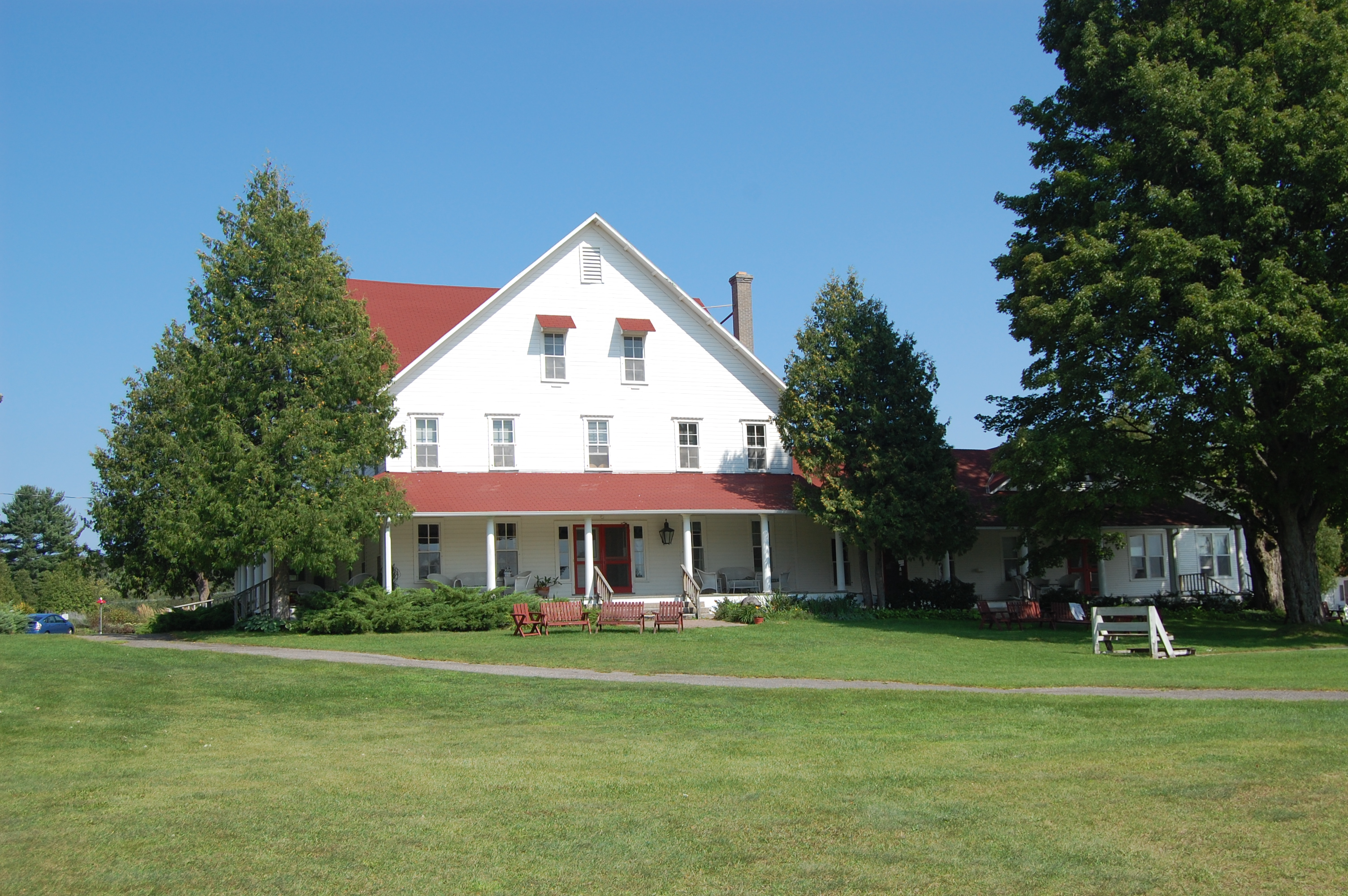
The main hotel of Fountain Point in 2010

Fountain Point Resort is one of the oldest recreational hotel complexes of its type in the state, and encompasses 54 acres (22 ha) of land, including a half-mile (0.8 km) of lakefront and the fountain. It is presently owned by Susan Jay Nichols; the property has been in her family for three generations. Her oldest son, Erik Zehender, manages the property.

Located near the quiet community of Lake Leelanau, the resort has a "no TV" policy, and features swimming, boating, tennis and numerous other indoor and outdoor activities. In addition, Fountain Point hosts numerous community and special events.

=== Concerts ===
Throughout the summer and Fall, the resort hosts musical performances featuring diverse groups and artists such as The Traverse Symphony Orchestra, The Accidentals, The Crane Wives, The Ragbirds and many others.

=== Lectures ===
From time to time the resort hosts lectures on various topics, such as gardening.

=== Rowing ===
The resort partners with the University of Michigan to offer rowing camps, and is home to the Lake Leelanau Rowing Club.

== See also ==
- Fountain Point
- List of Michigan State Historic Sites in Leelanau County, Michigan
