= Lake Leelanau Narrows Bridge =

- U.S. National Register of Historic Places
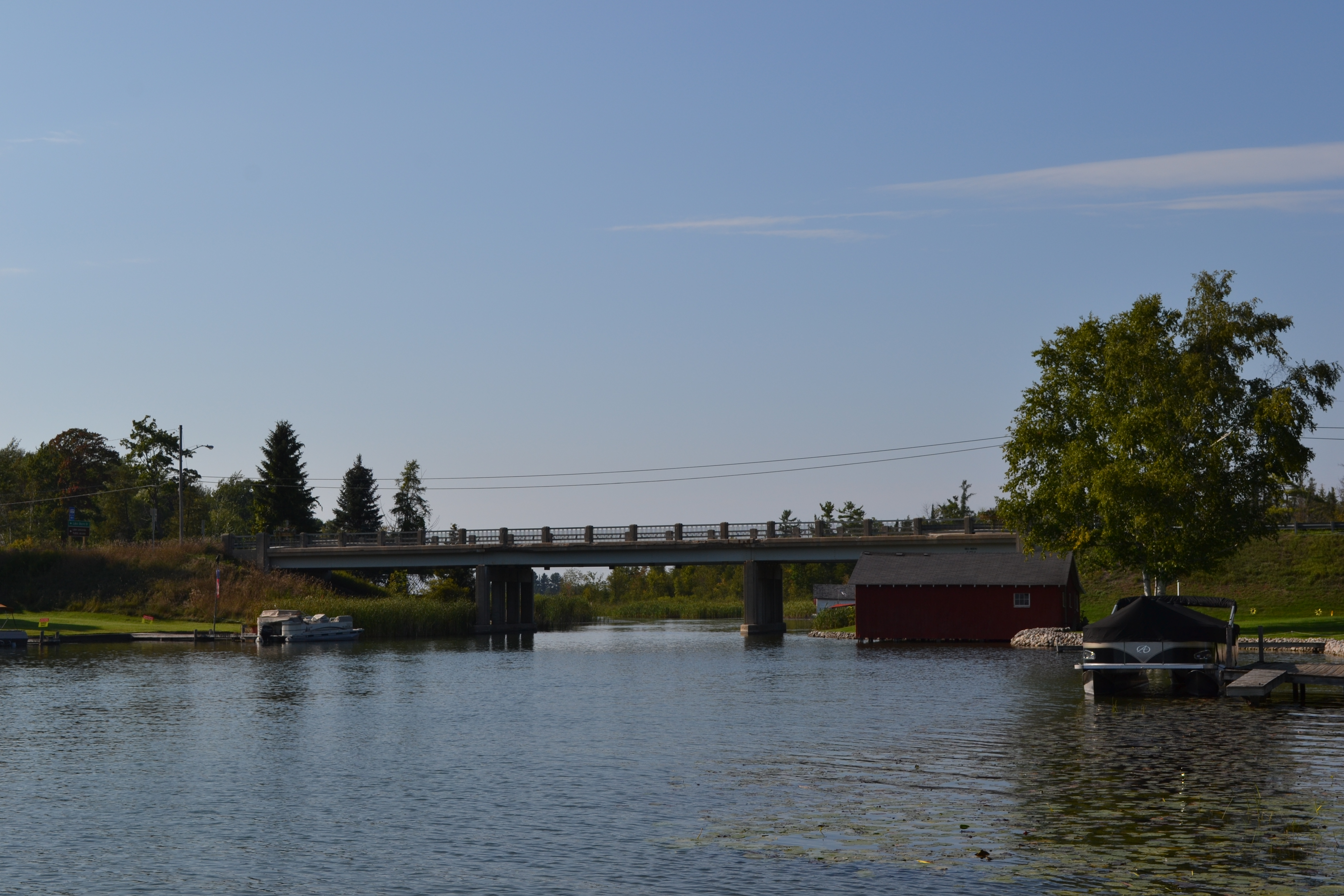

- Location within Michigan
- Interactive map
- Location: M-204 over Lake Leelanau Narrows, Leland Township, Michigan
- Coordinates: 44°58′53″N 85°42′42″W
- Area: less than one acre
- Built: 1939
- Built by: Hillding Construction Co.
- Architect: Michigan State Highway Department
- Architectural style: Steel I-beam stringer
- MPS: Highway Bridges of Michigan MPS
- NRHP reference No.: 99001732
- Added to NRHP: January 27, 2000

The Lake Leelanau Narrows Bridge is a bridge located on M-204 over Lake Leelanau Narrows in Leland Township, Michigan. It was listed on the National Register of Historic Places in 2000.

== History ==
Lake Leelanau was a major impediment to east-west travel since this area was first settled in the mid-1800s. A wooden bridge was erected over the narrows in 1864; a replacement metal truss bridge was constructed in 1894–1895. In 1939, the Michigan State Highway Department decided to replace the aging truss bridge to help support the local tourist economy. They built this new bridge about 200 yards north. The bridge project was part of the Federal Emergency Administration of Public Works, which provided jobs in the Great Depression through funding public infrastructure projects.

== Description ==
The Lake Leelanau Narrows Bridge is a three-span structure crossing the narrowest part of the 15-mile-long (24 km) Lake Leelanau. Each span is 60 feet (18 m) long and consists of nine rolled steel beams, sitting on concrete mid-stream piers and skewed end abutments. The base of each pier are formed into pointed cutwaters at each end. Four posts on each pier support the bridge, with the exterior post ending with a graceful Streamline Moderne curve. A similar curve is apparent on the concrete railing posts above. The deck of the bridge is 38 feet (12 m) wide, with sidewalks on each side of the roadway.
