= Suttons Bay =

Suttons Bay can refer to a community in the United States:

- The village of Suttons Bay, Michigan
- Suttons Bay Township, Michigan
