= Lake Leelanau, Michigan =

- Census-designated place (CDP) & unincorporated community
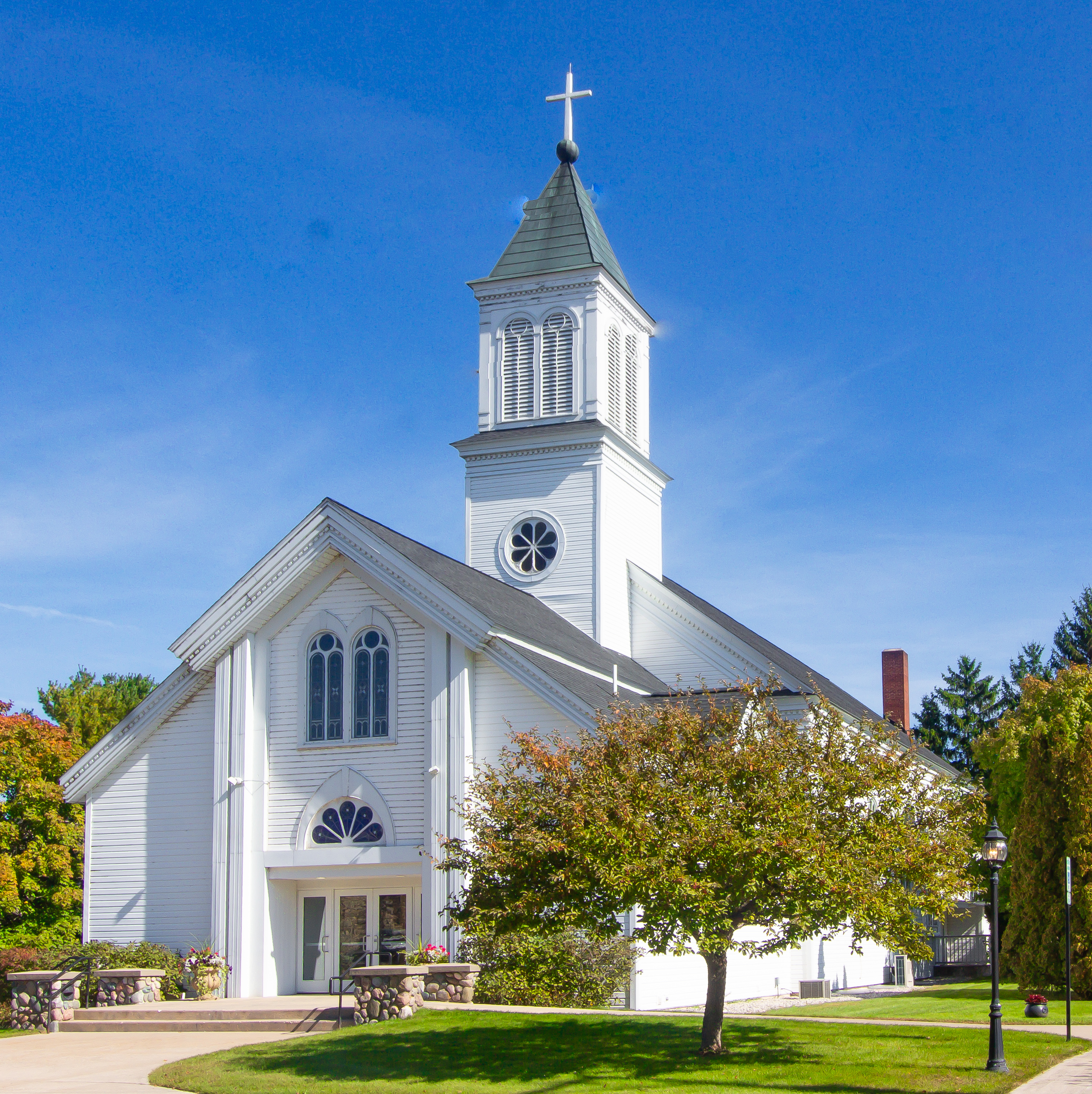
- St. Mary of the Assumption Catholic Church in Lake Leelanau

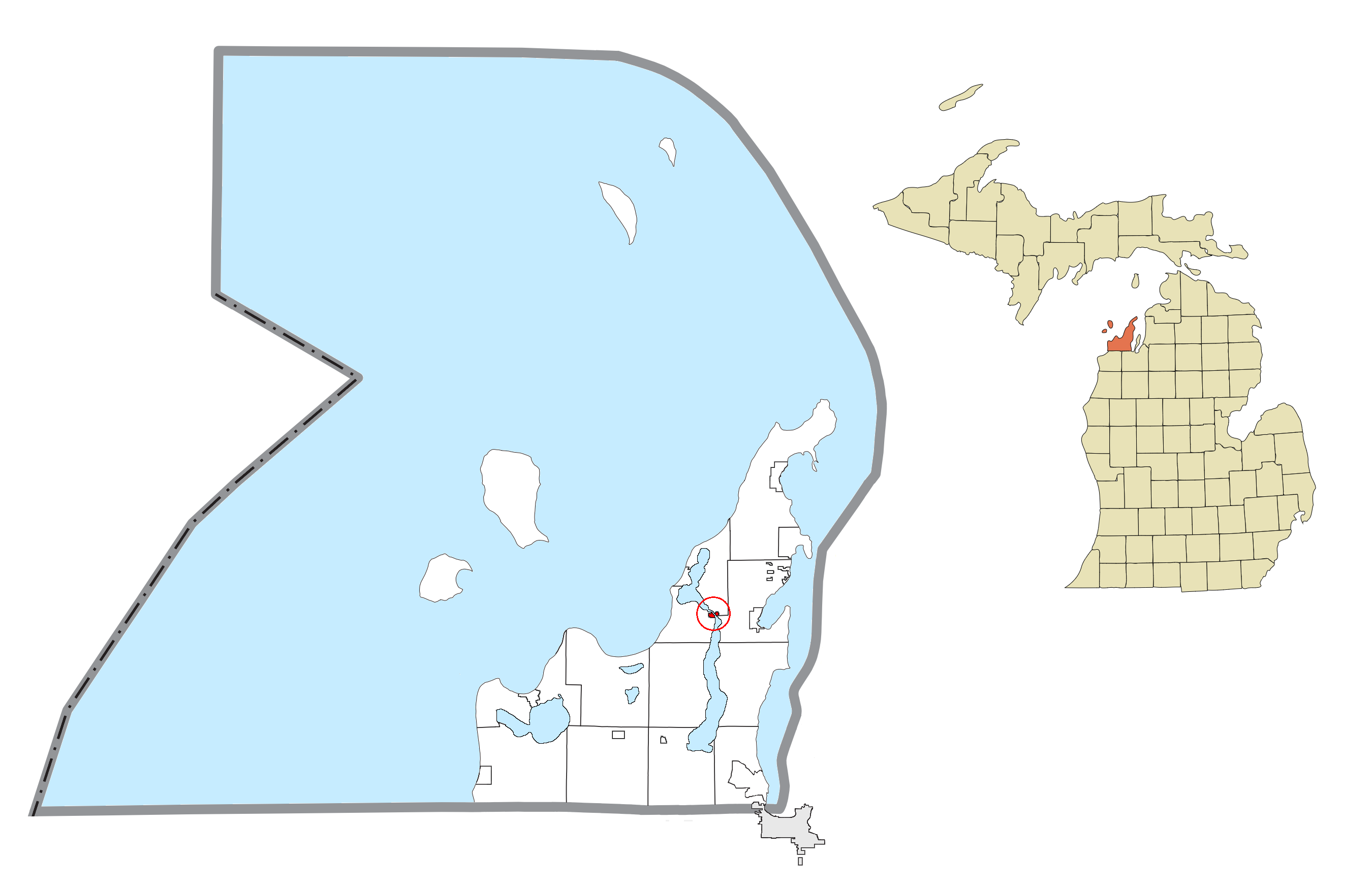
- Location within Leelanau County

- Location within the state of Michigan Location within the United States
- Coordinates: 44°58′51″N 85°42′54″W
- Country: United States
- State: Michigan
- County: Leelanau
- Township: Leland and Suttons Bay

Area
  - Total: 0.28 sq mi (0.73 km^{2})
  - Land: 0.25 sq mi (0.66 km^{2})
  - Water: 0.027 sq mi (0.07 km^{2})
- Elevation: 617 ft (188 m)

Population (2020)
  - Total: 229
  - Density: 898.3/sq mi (346.83/km^{2})
- Time zone: UTC-5 (Eastern (EST))
  - Summer (DST): UTC-4 (EDT)
- ZIP Code: 49653
- Area code: 231
- GNIS feature ID: 620195
- FIPS code: 26-44760

Lake Leelanau is an unincorporated community and census-designated place (CDP) in Leelanau County, Michigan, near the lake of the same name. As of the 2020 census it had a population of 229. It is situated along M-204 at the "narrows" that separate North and South Lake Leelanau. The community is divided between Leland Township and Suttons Bay Township.

== History ==
The Native Americans who first inhabited the area called this land ke-ski-bi-ag, which means "narrow body of water," and called the lake itself lee-lan-au, which means "delight of life". Henry Rowe Schoolcraft, an Indian agent for the territory, was credited with formally naming the county, and is said to have used Leelinau as a character in his writing. See Leelanau County for a more complete discussion of the etymology of the name.

Scholars have established that "Leelinau" was first one of the pen names used by his wife Jane Johnston Schoolcraft in writings for the Literary Voyager, a family magazine which she and her husband wrote together and circulated among friends in the 1820s. Jane Johnston was of Ojibwa and Scots-Irish descent, and wrote in Ojibwe and English. While her writing was not published formally in her lifetime (except as Schoolcraft appropriated it under his own name), Jane Johnston Schoolcraft has been recognized as "the first Native American literary writer, the first known Indian woman writer, the first known Indian poet, the first known poet to write poems in a Native American language, and the first known American Indian to write out traditional Indian stories." In 2008 Jane Johnston Schoolcraft was inducted into the Michigan Women's Hall of Fame.

As French settlers began arriving from Canada in the middle of the nineteenth century, the settlement became known as "Le Naro", owing to its location near the narrows. The narrows connect North and South Lake Leelanau. The early settlers called the river and the lake "Carp Lake", a term still used by some locals.

In 1854, a dam was built on the Leland River, near the northwest end of Lake Leelanau, raising the water 12 feet (3.7 m) and substantially increasing the size of the lakes. The Schaub family came in 1855 and took up farming; they planted the first vineyard in Leelanau County, and wine was sold locally and shipped to other markets such as Detroit and Ohio. In 1867, a fur trader named Andre de Beloit tried in vain to drill for oil. He hit an artesian spring which still gushes today at nearby Fountain Point resort.

On May 10, 1871, the first post office was established as "Provemont", a name believed to be derived from the word "improvement". On March 31, 1924, the village and post office adopted the name "Lake Leelanau".

In 1887, a Catholic school was built named St. Mary of the Assumption. The original two-story wooden building later burned down, and a brick building was erected in 1928 next to where the former building had stood.

== Geography ==
The community of Lake Leelanau is in northeastern Leelanau County and the southeastern part of Leland Township. A small portion extends east into Suttons Bay Township. Most of the community is on the west side of the Leelanau Narrows, but a portion is on the east side, extending east as far as County Road 641 (N. Eagle Highway). To the west, the CDP ends at N Plamondon Road. State highway M-204 passes through the center of the community, leading east 4 miles (6 km) to Suttons Bay on Grand Traverse Bay and west 3 miles (5 km) to M-22 near the shore of Lake Michigan.

According to the U.S. Census Bureau, the Lake Leelanau CDP has an area of 0.28 square miles (0.73 km^{2}), of which 0.25 square miles (0.66 km^{2}) are land and 0.03 square miles (0.07 km^{2}), or 9.80%, are water. The outlet of North Lake Leelanau into Lake Michigan is 4 miles (6 km) to the northwest at the community of Leland.

== Demographics ==
In Lake Leelanau, Michigan, the five largest ethnic groups are White (Non-Hispanic) (100%), White (Hispanic) (0%), Black or African American (Non-Hispanic) (0%), and American Indian & Alaska Native (Non-Hispanic) (0%).

Historical population
Census	Pop.	Note	%±
2010	253		—
2020	229		−9.5%
U.S. Decennial Census

== Community ==
As summer comes to the Leelanau Peninsula, vacationers come to the area to enjoy its scenery, boating, fishing, restaurants, and shops along the narrows. This tranquil life was celebrated in a series of essays written by Kathleen Stocking.

In the surrounding area, sightseers can make short trips to Leland, Suttons Bay, Glen Arbor, Northport and Sleeping Bear Dunes National Lakeshore. The area's soils support several orchards and wineries available for agri-tourism.

The community has been part to substantial efforts to protect the area from growth, and to foster a nature conservancy.

== Climate ==
The climatic region is typified by large seasonal temperature differences, with warm to hot (and often humid) summers and cold (sometimes severely cold) winters. According to the Köppen Climate Classification system, Lake Leelanau has a humid continental climate, abbreviated "Dfb" on climate maps.
