= Peshawbestown, Michigan =

- Unincorporated community
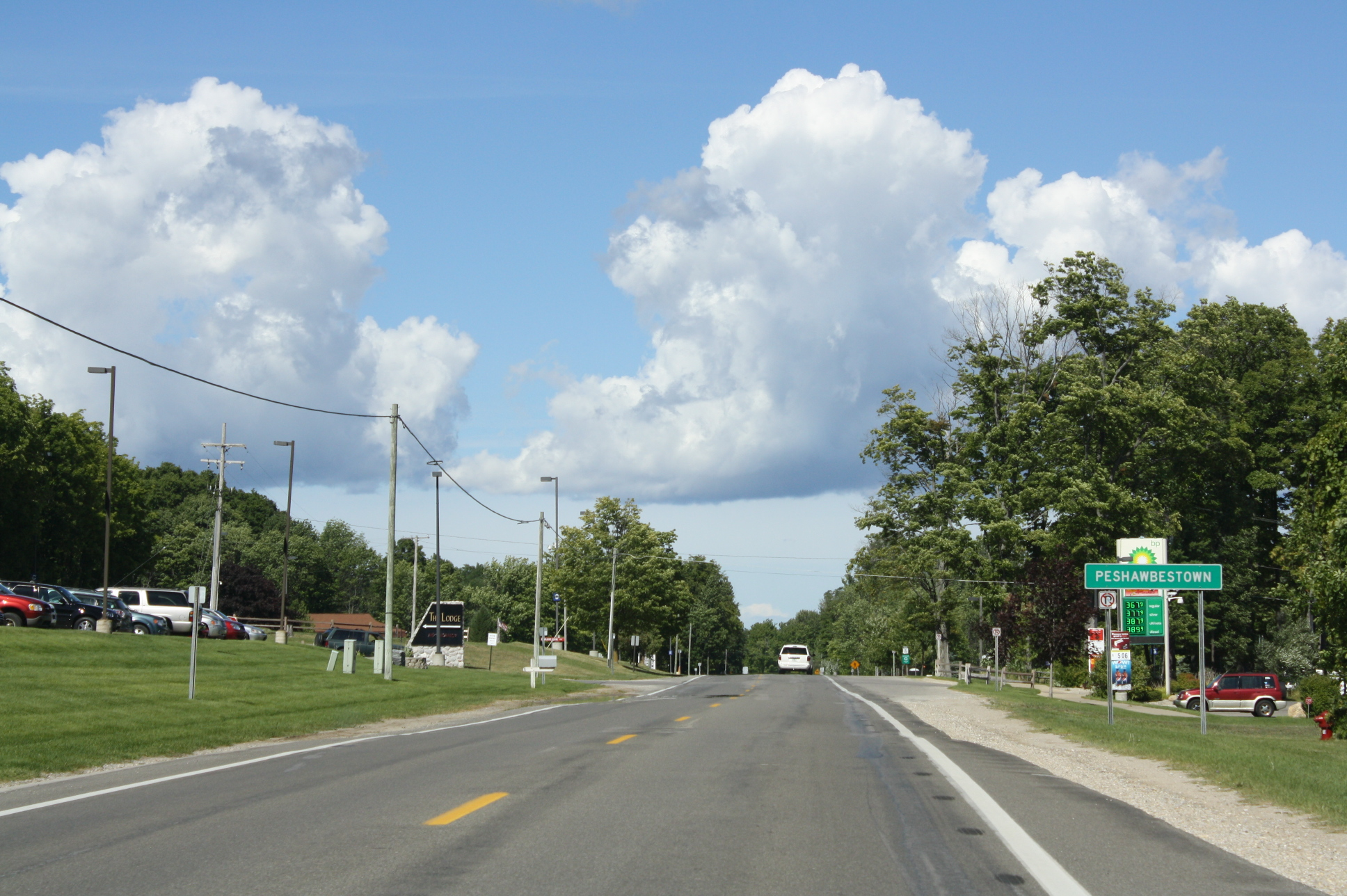
- Looking north along M-22

- Location within the state of Michigan Peshawbestown (the United States)
- Coordinates: 45°01′27″N 85°36′03″W
- Country: United States
- State: Michigan
- County: Leelanau
- Township: Suttons Bay
- Elevation: 610 ft (186 m)
- Time zone: UTC-5 (EST)
  - Summer (DST): UTC-4 (EDT)
- ZIP code(s): 49682
- Area code: 231
- FIPS code: 26-63760
- GNIS feature ID: 634689

Peshawbestown (/ˈpʃɔːbətaʊn/ PSHAW-bə-town) is an unincorporated community in Suttons Bay Township of Leelanau in the U.S. state of Michigan. In historical documents, the name is spelled variously as Peshabetown, Peshabatown, Pshawbatown, Preshabestown.

The community is on M-22 about 10 miles (16 km) south of Northport, 4 miles (6.4 km) north of Suttons Bay, and about 20 miles (32 km) north of Traverse City. It is on the east side of the Leelanau Peninsula on the western shore of the Grand Traverse Bay.

Peshawbestown occupies about 12.5 acres (51,000 m^{2}) of the federally recognized Grand Traverse Band of Ottawa and Chippewa Indians reservation. The primary economic base of the community is tourism, with the main feature being the Leelanau Sands Casino. Other notable feature include the historic Kateri Tekakwitha Catholic Church, dedicated to the first Native American saint in the Roman Catholic Church, who was canonized in 2012. She was a Mohawk woman who converted to Catholicism in New York in the French colonial period, later moving to Kahnawake near Montreal. The tribe holds the annual Peshawbestown Pow-Wow, which takes place each August with native foods, tribal art, and dancing.

== History ==
The community developed from a Franciscan Catholic mission, beginning about 1850, to the Chippewa and Ottawa peoples of the area and appears to have been named for a chief of the indigenous people. In 1911 the village was described as "two long rows of log cabins, built in 1849," in a February 12, 1911, Detroit Free Press article quoted by Powers. He refers to the place as Pshawbatown, and says that Father Ignatius Mrak brought here a group of Chippewa from Sault Ste. Marie in 1849 when he established the mission.

But the Catholic Encyclopedia says that from 1849 to 1851, Mrak was assisting Father Francis Pierz in Arbre Croche, a former French colonial settlement near Harbor Springs on Little Traverse Bay.

Romig says the mission was begun in 1852 by Belgian-born Fr. Angelus Van Praemel. Mrak, who referred to it as Eagletown, succeeded him in 1855. Romig writes that Mrak's successor, the "Rev. Philip Zorn, calls it as Peshaube, after its ruling chief Peshaba; from 1895 on, Rev. Bruno Torka, O.F.M., who was next in charge, calls it Peshawbeston.

== Gallery ==
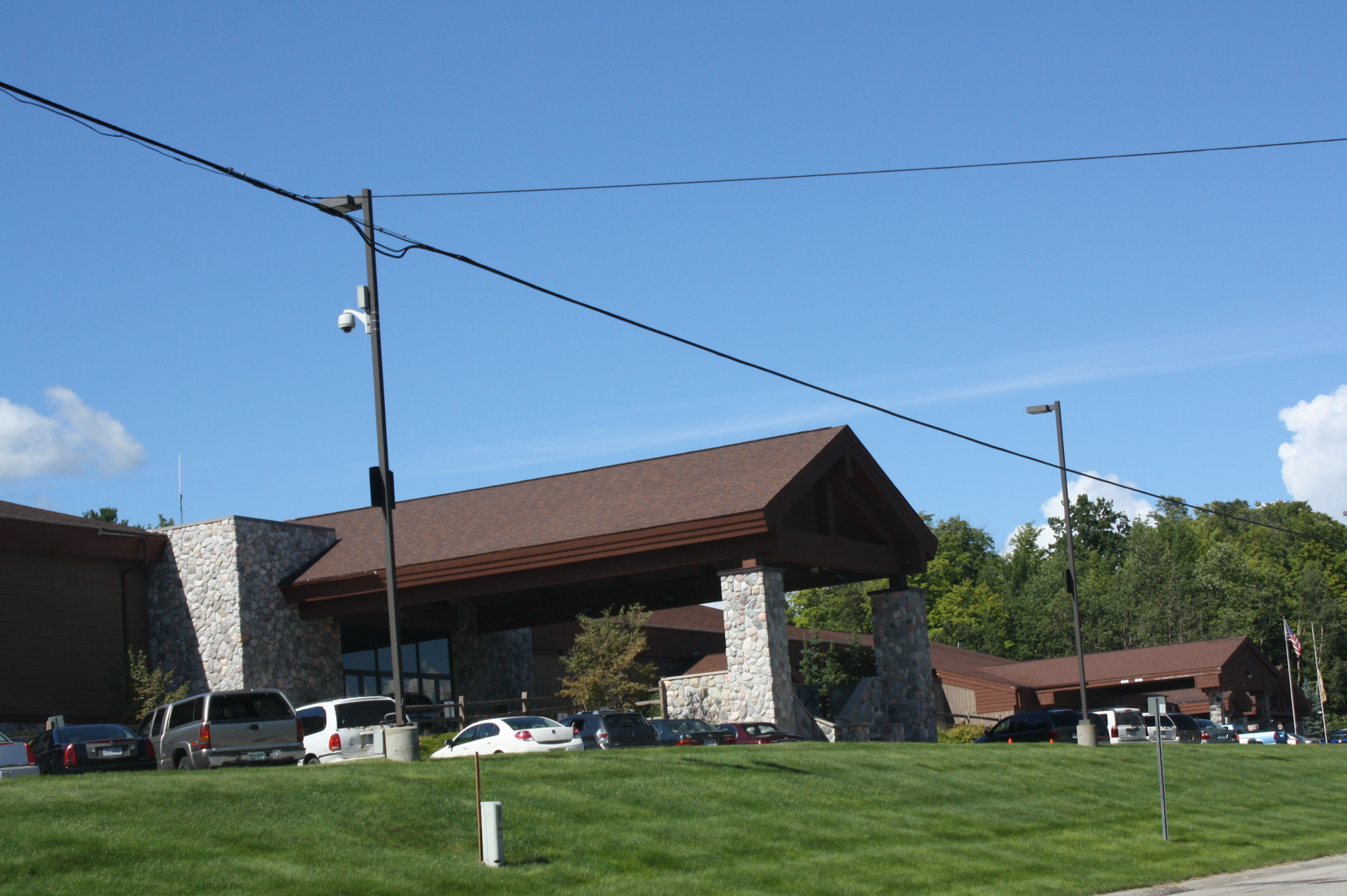
Leelanau Sands Casino

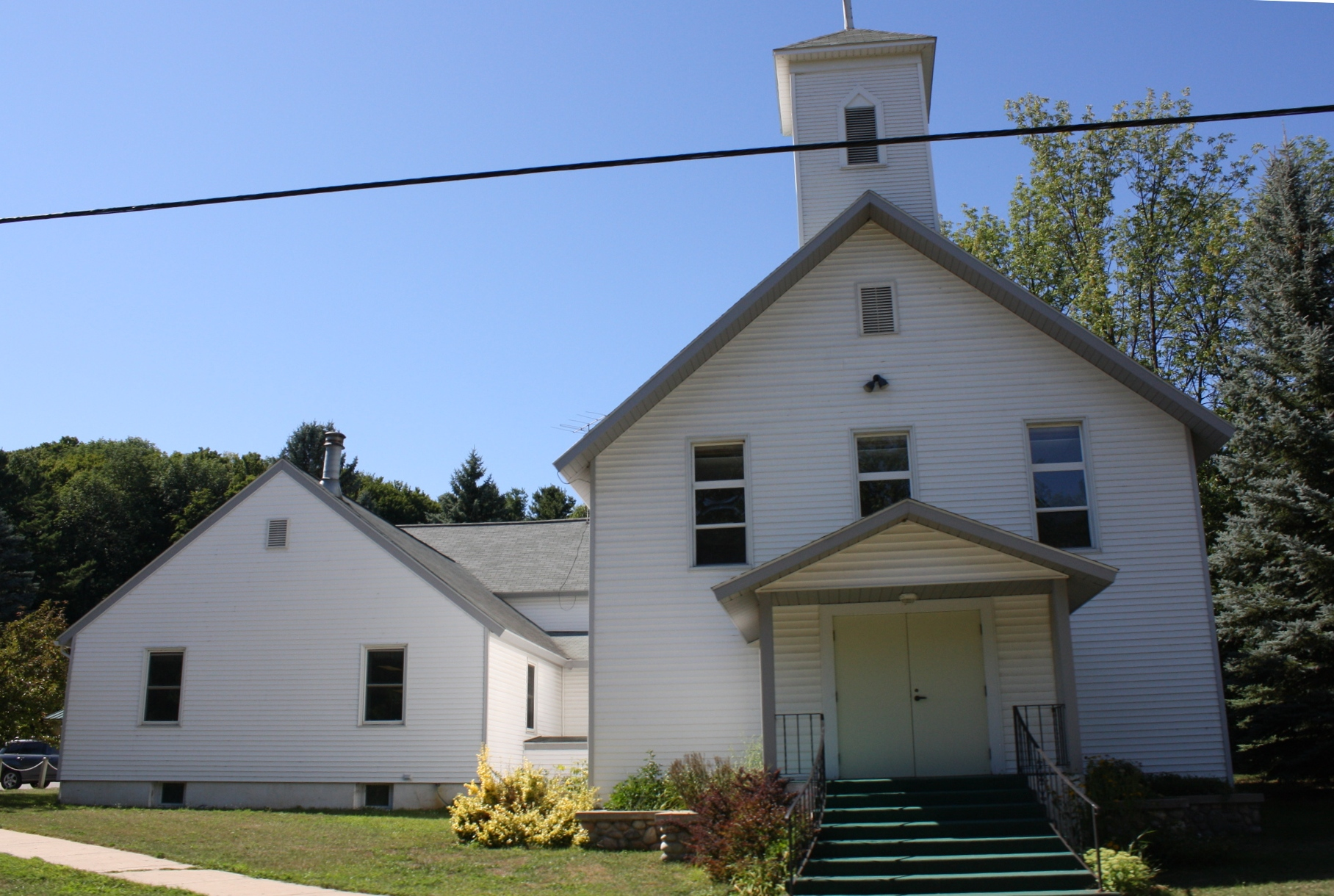
Saint Kateri Tekakwitha Paris

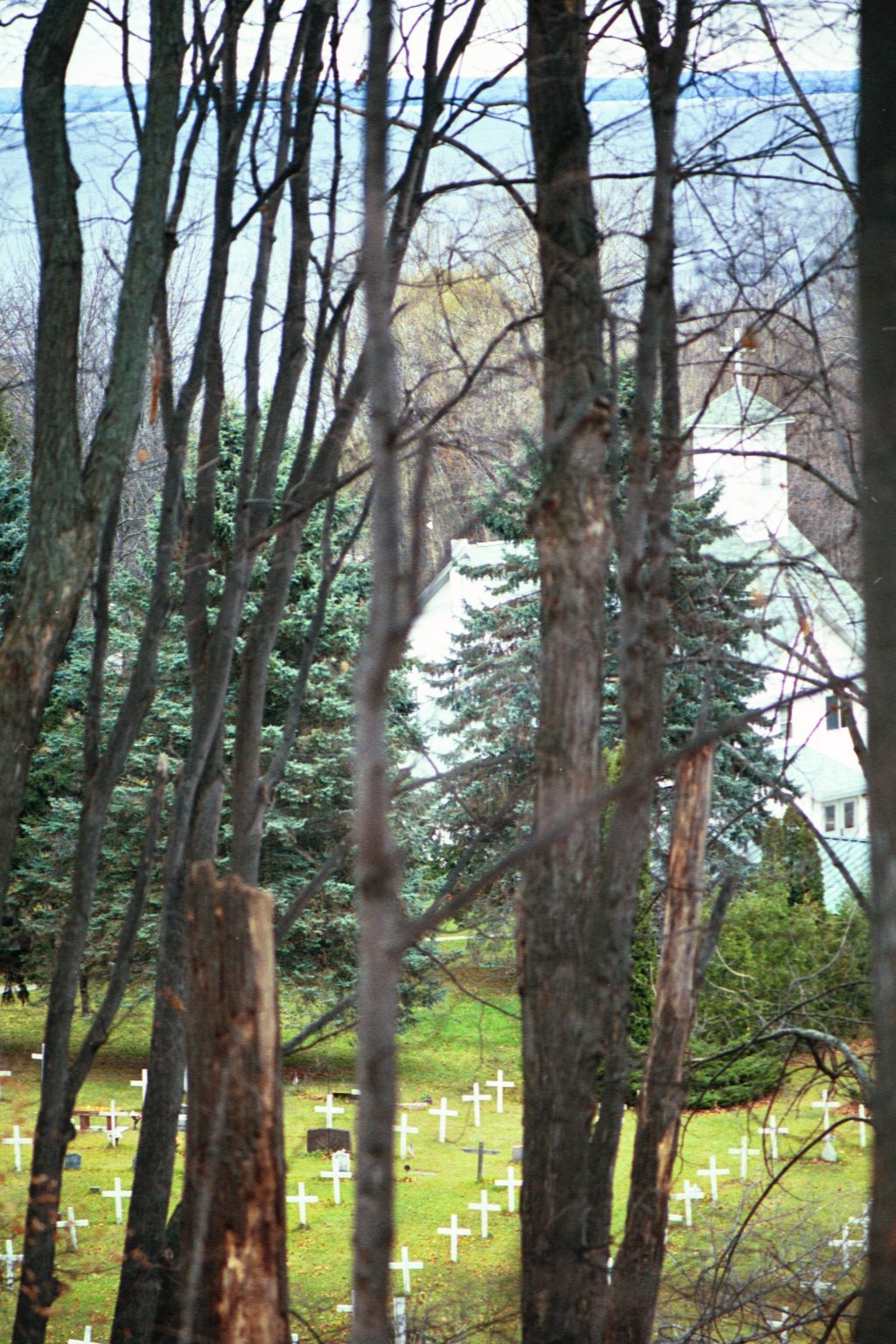
Overlook of churchyard

== Sources ==
- Powers, Perry Francis. A history of northern Michigan and its people. Chicago: Lewis Publishing Co., 1912. pp. 351–352
- Romig, Walter, L.H.D. Michigan Place Names. Detroit: Wayne State University Press, 1986
- Catholic Encyclopedia
- Third Coast Traveller article on Peshawbestown
- U.S. Census Bureau
