= Suttons Bay Township, Michigan =

- Civil township
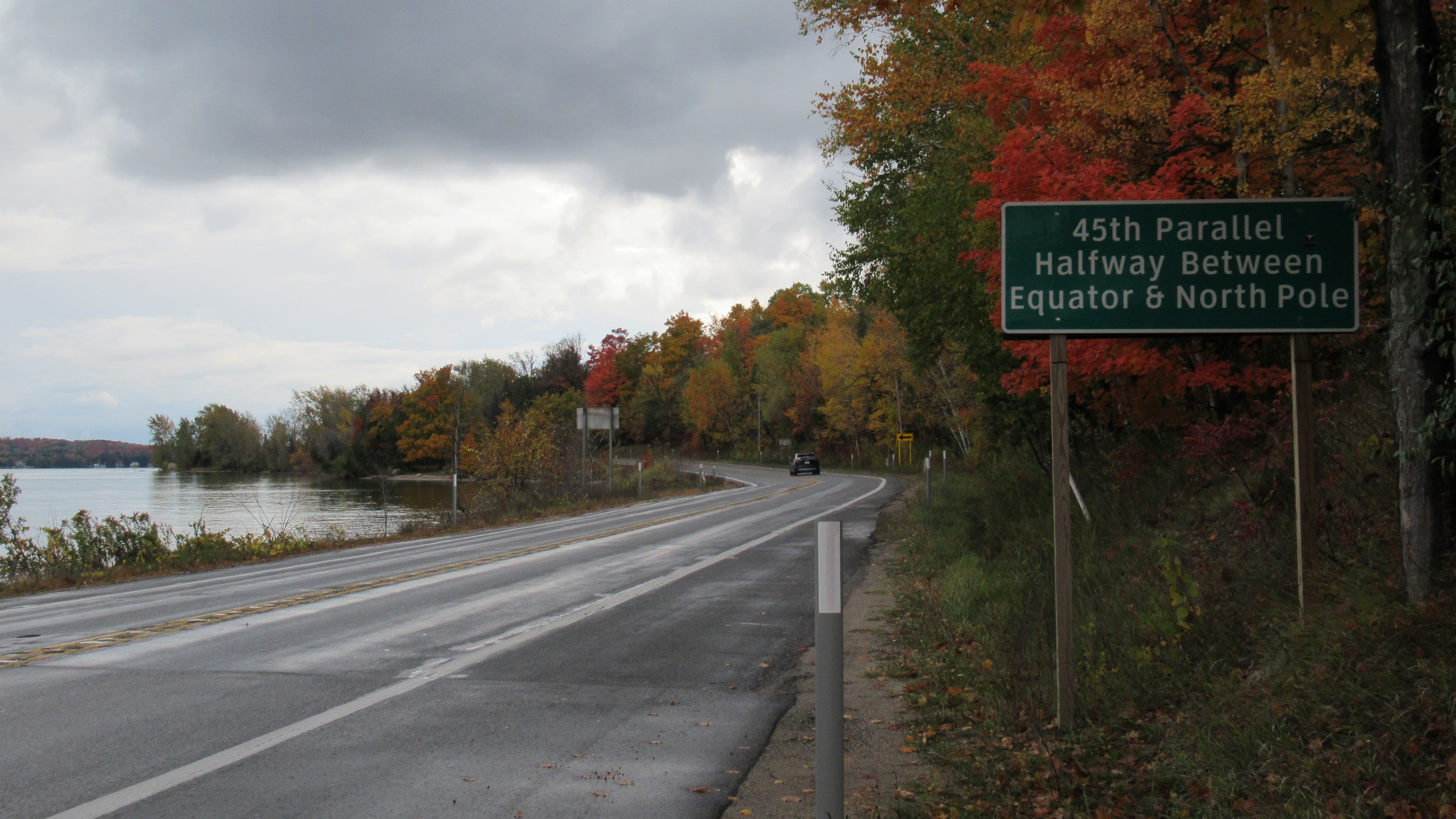
- 45th parallel sign along M-22, north of Suttons Bay

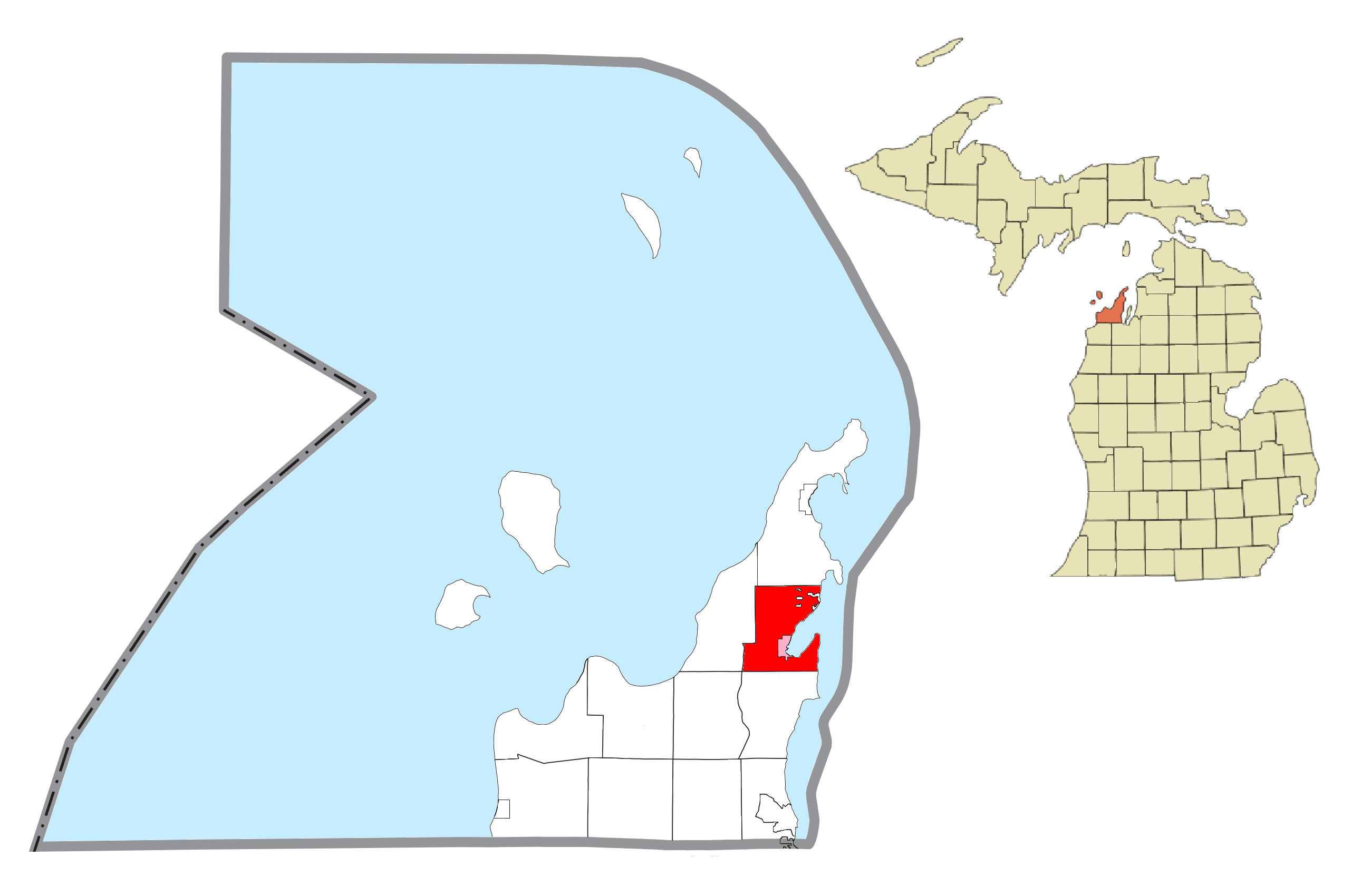
- Location within Leelanau County (red) and the administered village of Suttons Bay (pink)

- Location within the state of Michigan Suttons Bay Township (the United States)
- Coordinates: 44°59′35″N 85°38′11″W
- Country: United States
- State: Michigan
- County: Leelanau
- Established: 1863

Government
  - Supervisor: Tom Nixon
  - Clerk: Sandra Van Huystee

Area
  - Total: 41.89 sq mi (108.5 km^{2})
  - Land: 24.52 sq mi (63.5 km^{2})
  - Water: 17.37 sq mi (45.0 km^{2})
- Elevation: 600 ft (183 m)

Population (2020)
  - Total: 2,883
  - Density: 117.6/sq mi (45.4/km^{2})
- Time zone: UTC-5 (EST)
  - Summer (DST): UTC-4 (EDT)
- ZIP code(s): 49653 (Lake Leelanau); 49682 (Suttons Bay)
- Area code: 231
- FIPS code: 26-77620
- GNIS feature ID: 1627143
- Website: Official website

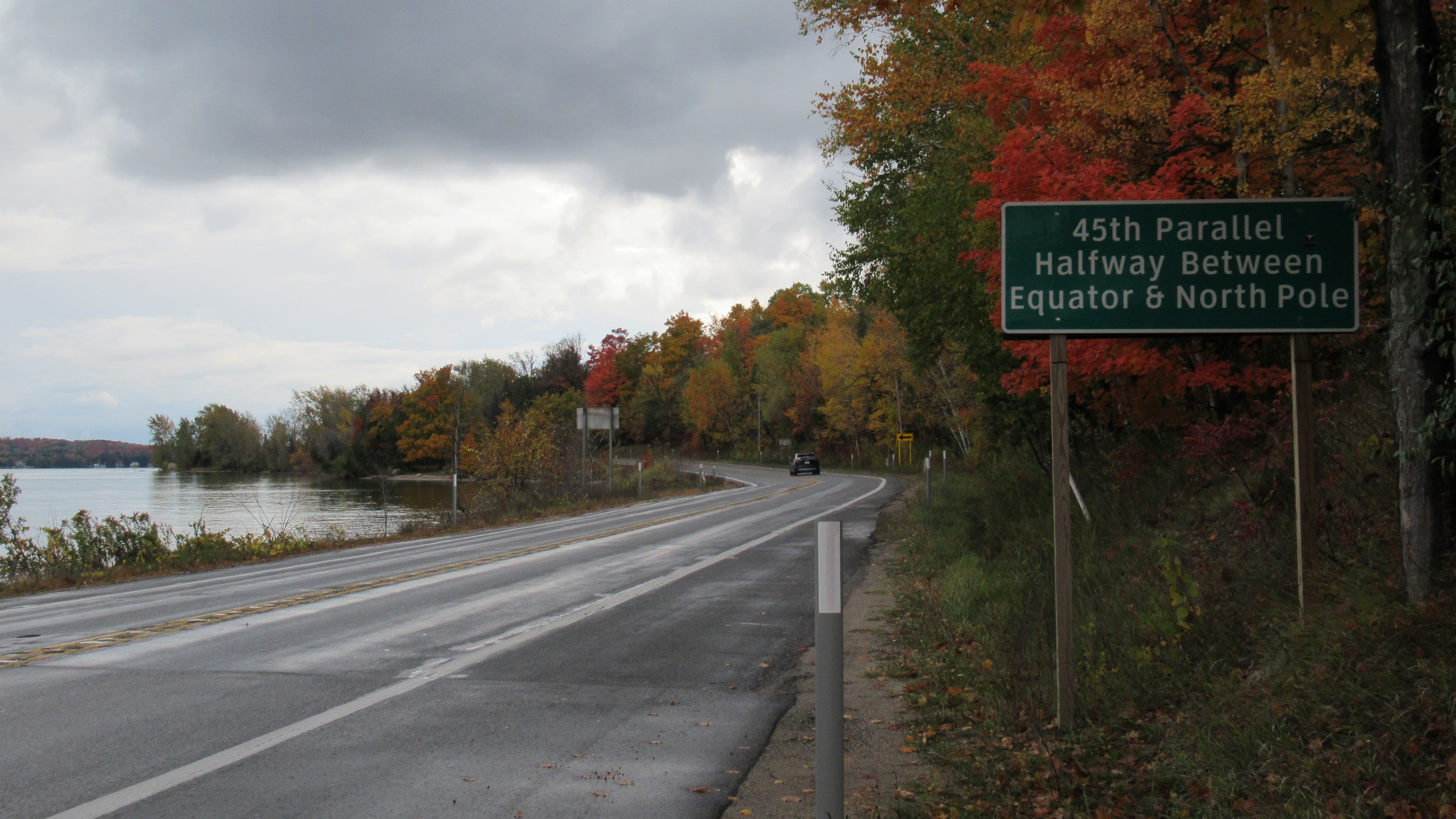
The 45th parallel marker along M-22

Suttons Bay Township is a civil township and county seat of Leelanau County in the U.S. state of Michigan. The population was 2,883 at the 2020 census. The village of Suttons Bay is located within the township along Grand Traverse Bay.

In a 2004 referendum, voters approved moving the county seat from the community of Leland to a site in section 19 in the southwest corner of the township, nearer to the geographic center of the county. Suttons Bay Township is the only civil township to serve as a county seat in the state of Michigan.

== Communities ==
- Grand Traverse Band of Ottawa and Chippewa Indians headquarters are located within Suttons Bay Township with a small reservation in the northeast portion of the township near Peshawbestown.
- Lake Leelanau is an unincorporated community and census-designated place partially within Suttons Bay Township. The majority of the community is to the west in Leland Township.
- Peshawbestown is an unincorporated community along M-22 in the northern portion of the township.
- Suttons Bay is a village within the township.

== History ==
In 1854, Harry Chittenden Sutton and his crew established a wooding station to provide fuel to wood-burning steamboats. The Sutton name first caused the village to be called Suttonsburg. Pleasant City was another name, but Suttons Bay was later adopted for this growing community.

Railroads played an important role in the development of the area. Running through Suttons Bay, the train passed near the site of Sutton's station and the community's next enterprise, a sawmill built by Sutton's son-in-law, George Carr, and connected to Fountain Point, an historic resort site.

The township also includes the small Ojibwe community of Peshawbestown, also known as Eagletown. Once a Franciscan mission named after Chief Peshaba, who ruled in the 1880s, this community has grown to include a casino and resort.

Other features of Suttons Bay Township include Lake Leelanau on its southwestern corner, which can be accessed by taking M-204 west to the community of Lake Leelanau, where the channel runs between Lake Leelanau's upper and lower lakes. This township is also prime cherry country, with several orchards and wineries among its hills.

The township contains Fountain Point, which was built in 1889 and is listed on the National Register of Historic Places.

== Geography ==
According to the United States Census Bureau, the township has a total area of 41.89 square miles (108.49 km^{2}), of which 24.52 square miles (63.51 km^{2}) is land and 17.37 square miles (44.99 km^{2}) (41.47%) is water.

The 45th parallel runs through Suttons Bay Township with a marker along M-22. The township is bordered on the east by the West Arm of Grand Traverse Bay and partially by Lake Leelanau on the southwest.

=== Major highways ===
- M-22 runs south–north along the coast of Grand Traverse Bay
- M-204 runs east–west through the township beginning in the village of Suttons Bay

== Demographics ==
As of the census of 2000, there were 2,982 people, 1,114 households, and 834 families residing in the township. The population density was 121.2 inhabitants per square mile (46.8/km^{2}). There were 1,406 housing units at an average density of 57.2 per square mile (22.1/km^{2}). The racial makeup of the township was 75.52% White, 0.20% African American, 19.01% Native American, 0.10% Asian, 3.45% from other races, and 1.71% from two or more races. Hispanic or Latino of any race were 6.51% of the population.

There were 1,114 households, out of which 32.9% had children under the age of 18 living with them, 59.3% were married couples living together, 11.0% had a female householder with no husband present, and 25.1% were non-families. 21.5% of all households were made up of individuals, and 8.3% had someone living alone who was 65 years of age or older. The average household size was 2.67 and the average family size was 3.07.

In the township the population was spread out, with 28.9% under the age of 18, 6.3% from 18 to 24, 23.7% from 25 to 44, 26.6% from 45 to 64, and 14.6% who were 65 years of age or older. The median age was 40 years. For every 100 females, there were 102.3 males. For every 100 females age 18 and over, there were 99.7 males.

The median income for a household in the township was $48,068, and the median income for a family was $52,596. Males had a median income of $36,389 versus $22,794 for females. The per capita income for the township was $22,640. About 5.8% of families and 7.1% of the population were below the poverty line, including 8.9% of those under age 18 and 5.6% of those age 65 or over.
