= St. Mary High School (Lake Leelanau, Michigan) =

St. Mary's Catholic School

Location
- 303 South Saint Mary's Street; Lake Leelanau, Michigan 49653; United States; 44°58′49″N 85°42′49″W

Information
- Type: Private, Coeducational
- Religious affiliation: Roman Catholic
- Established: 1887
- Oversight: Roman Catholic Diocese of Gaylord
- Superintendent: Frank Sander
- Principal: Megan Glynn
- Grades: Pre-K–12
- Colors: royal blue and white
- Athletics conference: Cherryland Conference
- Nickname: Eagles
- Publication: Eagles Wings
- Tuition: Rate ranges from $4,635 to $6,895
- Website: www.stmarysll.org

St. Mary's Catholic School is a co-educational private, Roman Catholic high school in Lake Leelanau, Michigan, USA. It is located in the Roman Catholic Diocese of Gaylord.
