= North Manitou Island Lifesaving Station =

- U.S. National Register of Historic Places
- U.S. National Historic Landmark District
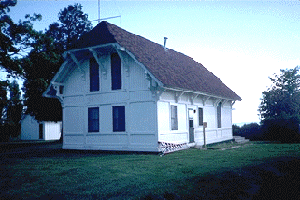
- Undated National Park Service photo

- Location within Michigan Location within the United States
- Interactive map
- Location: East Coast, North Manitou Island, Sleeping Bear Dunes National Lakeshore, Michigan
- Coordinates: 45°7′16″N 85°58′39″W
- Area: 3 acres (1.2 ha)
- Built: 1854
- Architect: Francis W. Chandler, Albert B. Bibb
- Architectural style: Gothic Revival, Queen Anne, Stick/Eastlake
- NRHP reference No.: 98001191

Significant dates
- Added to NRHP: August 5, 1998
- Designated NHLD: August 6, 1998

North Manitou Island Lifesaving Station, also known as North Manitou Coast Guard Station, is a complex of buildings located on North Manitou Island, which is part of Sleeping Bear Dunes National Lakeshore in Michigan, in the U.S. The complex was constructed as a life-saving station. It is the only remaining station which was in use during all three periods of lifesaving service history, from the early volunteer period through operation by the United States Life-Saving Service and the United States Coast Guard. It was declared a National Historic Landmark in 1998.

== History ==
In 1854, the United States Congress allocated money to establish volunteer life-saving stations on the Great Lakes. The North Manitou Island Lifesaving Station was established that same year. Nicholas Pickard, a resident of North Manitou Island, requested and received from the government a lifesaving boat and the standardized plans to construct the station. The boathouse on North Manitou Island is the only remaining boathouse constructed using the 1854 standard plans.

The United States Life-Saving Service was established in 1871, and the previously all-volunteer lifesaving stations were converted to house paid crews. In 1874, they took over operation of the North Manitou Island station. A new station was constructed in 1877, and a paid crew installed the following year. The crew initially boarded with local residents, but in 1887 a crew quarters was built as part of the life-saving station. Additional structures were built at the station as needed. These included private homes, built by crew members; many of these were later moved to other locations on private lots.

The Life-Saving Service was merged into the United States Coast Guard in 1915, and the Coast Guard operated the station continuously until 1932, when it was determined that the station, lacking a protected boat launch, was no longer needed. The station continued operation with a skeleton crew until 1938, when it was sold to the Manitou Island Association, a private corporation. The Association used the buildings to house employees, and for general operation of their island hunting preserve. The National Park Service acquired the station in 1984.

== Description ==
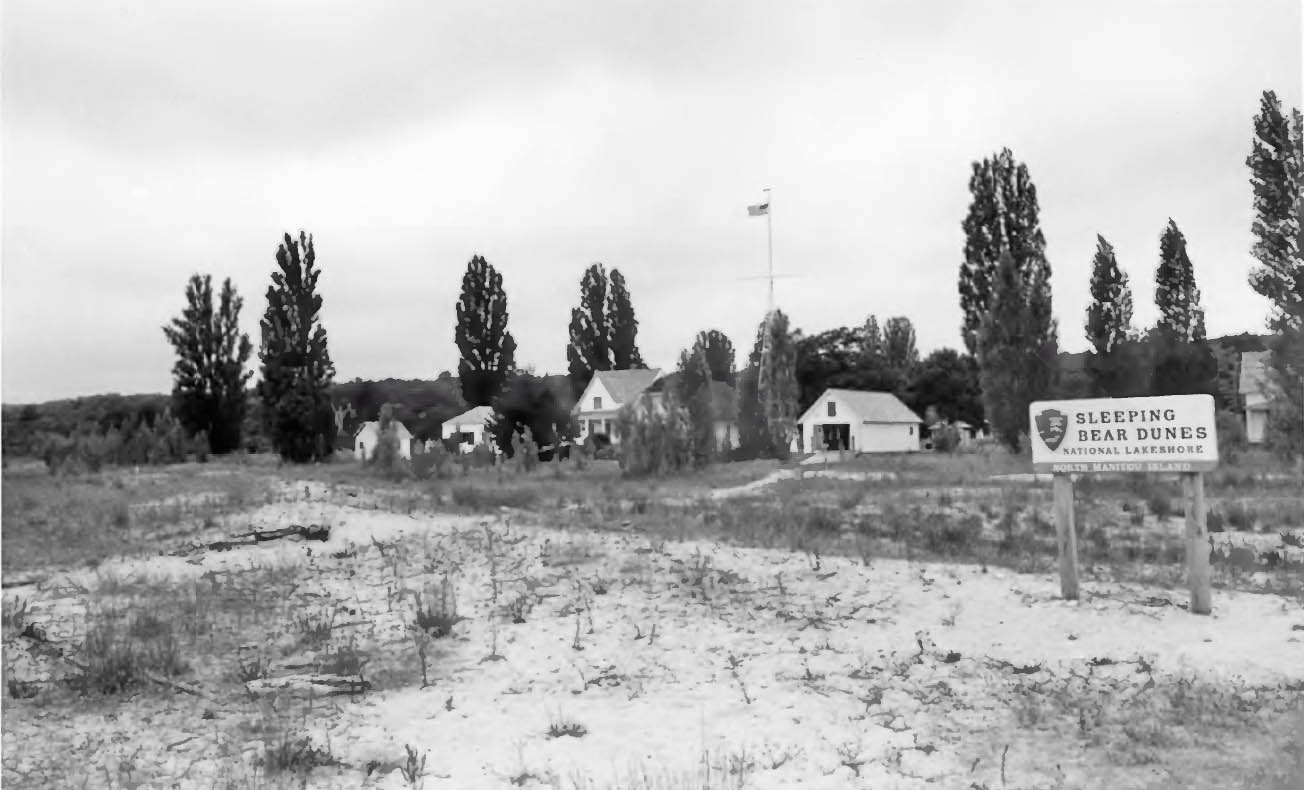
Panorama of district

The North Manitou Island Lifesaving Station is a complex of buildings located on 3 acres (1.2 ha) of land on the northeast shoreline of North Manitou Island. The structures in the district date from 1854 to about 1916, and represent a range of historic architectural styles, as well as the three distinct periods of lifesaving history.

The Lifesaving Station is located on a broad flat plain facing a sandy beach, separated from structures in the nearby village by a grassy field. An access road runs nearby. A number of structures were built at the station over time; some have been removed or demolished. Remaining structures in the district include:

=== Volunteer Rescue Station (1854) ===
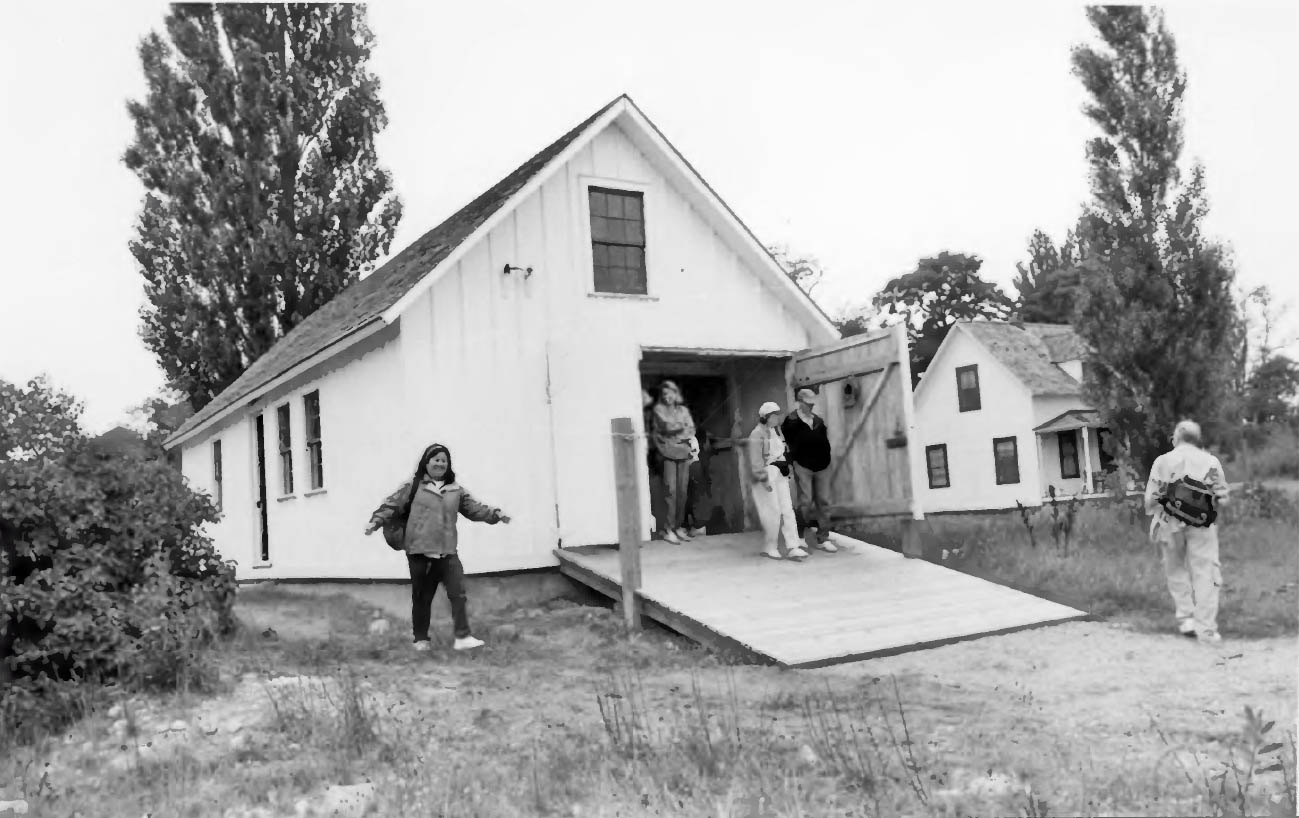
1854 Volunteer Station

The Volunteer Rescue Station is a 1-1/2 story frame boathouse clad in cedar boards, approximately 17 feet (5.2 m) wide by 36 feet (11 m). A single first-floor room was used to house the surfboat, and a small loft above was used for the storage of other equipment. The structure has been restored to its original appearance.

=== U.S. Life Boat Station (1877) ===
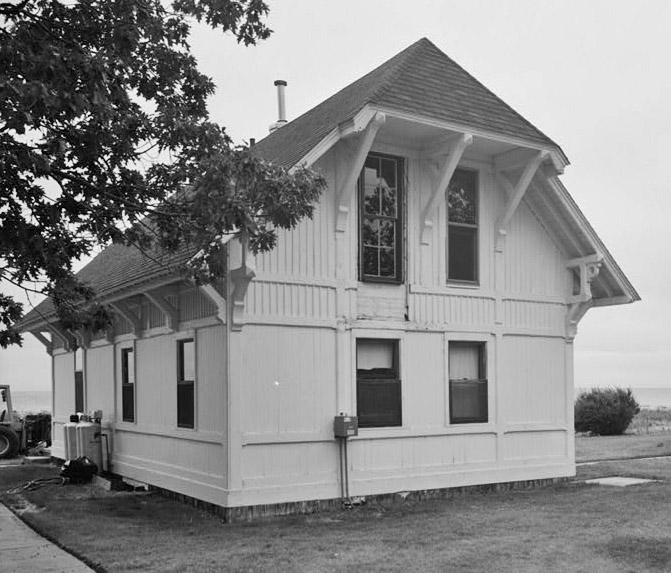
1877 Boathouse

The U.S. Life Boat Station was constructed using a modified version of the floor plan designed by Francis W. Chandler in 1876. It is a two-story structure with a clipped gable end, providing shelter for a lookout balcony on one end. It is covered with vertical batten siding, with bracketry beneath the eaves. The Manitou Island Association converted the structure into a quarters and a storehouse, and the Sleeping Bear Dunes National Lakeshore adapted this boathouse into a dormitory in 1990.

=== U.S. Life-Saving Service Dwelling (1887) ===
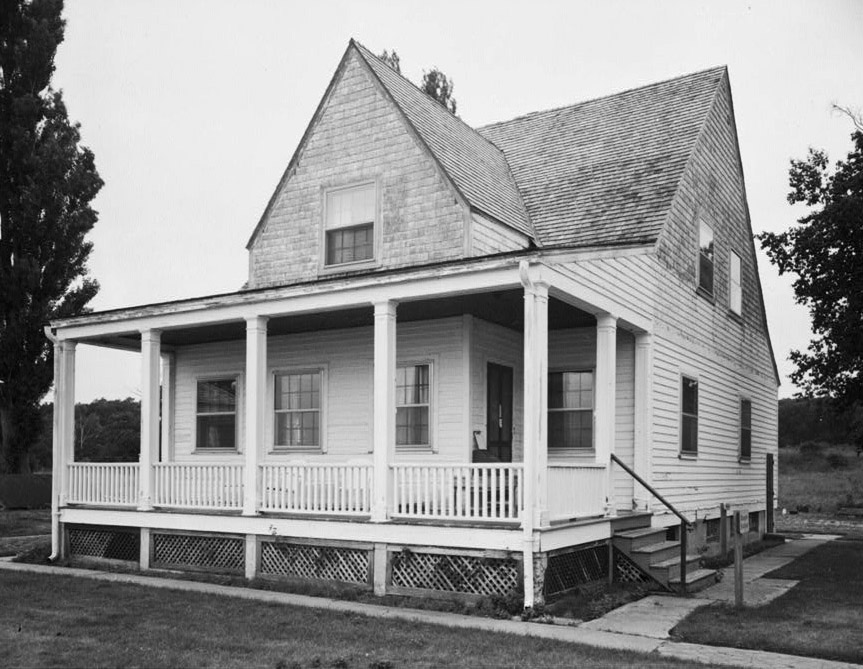
1887 Crews Quarters

This dwelling, believed to have been developed by Life-Saving Service architect Albert B. Bibb, is believed to be the only one constructed of its type in the country. It is a two-story structure with cross-gables, and originally housed the captain on the first floor and the crew on the second. In 1932, the Coast Guard renovated the structure, placing it on a basement, adding a front porch, and reworking the location of the stairs. In 1992, the Park Service adapted the building to house staff.

=== Hans Halseth House (1890s) ===
The Hans Halseth House was originally located some distance north of the station, and was moved to its current location in 1912. The house is a 1-1/2 story side-gabled structure with a gabled dormer centered in the front. The house has been modified several times, including the addition of a hip roof front porch and two additions on the side. In 1990, the Park Service renovated and restored this building to house employees.

=== Crew Ready Room (1895) ===
The Crew Ready Room is a pyramidal hipped roof building where the on-duty crew would wait. The building has lost much of its historical integrity, and is considered non-contributing to the historic district.

=== Root Cellar (1899) ===
The root cellar is primarily constructed of field stone and mortar, with a wood shingled gable roof on top. Access into the cellar is an inclined double wooden cellar door at the surface, down a set of stairs, and through a second wooden door at the bottom of the stairs. The cellar has a round air vent on one side and a square screened hole on the other, providing air movement into the cellar.

=== Storm Tower and Flag Locker (c. 1905) ===
The storm tower is a four-sided metal-framed structure, made of open trusses with taper to a point 50 feet (15 m) above the ground. A 20 feet (6.1 m) tall staff with sidearms projects above. The staff flew an American flag from the top, and storm flags from the yards. Flags were stored in a metal locker at the base of the tower.

=== Generator Building (1914-16) ===
The Generator Building is a small single story shed with gabled ends. It has three windows and a single door.
