= Fountain Point =

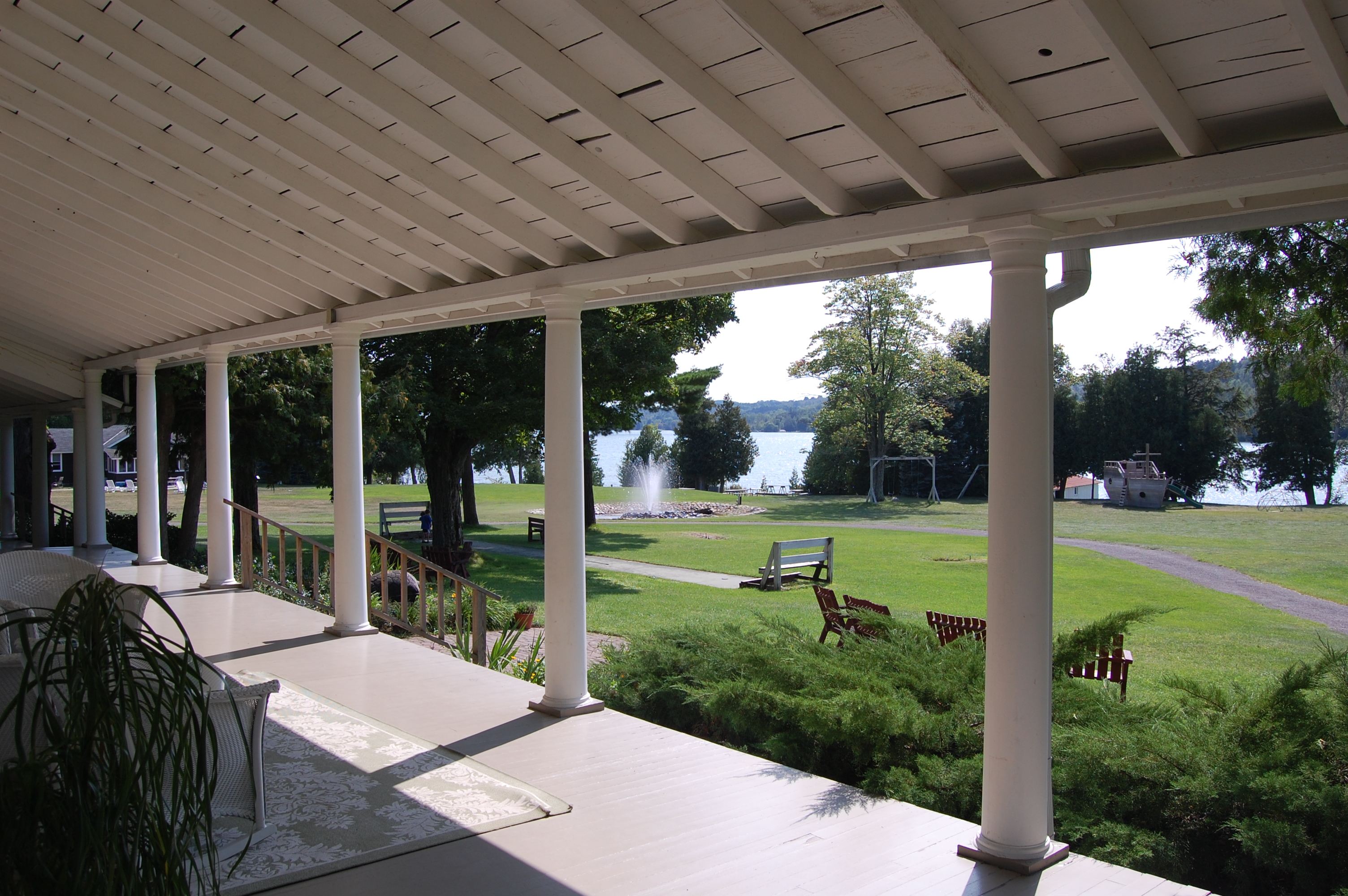
Fountain Point porch 2 2010.JPG

Fountain Point is a geographic landmark located on the eastern shore of South Lake Leelanau in Suttons Bay Township, Michigan. Its name is derived from a fountain of sparkling artesian spring water, situated on a large point on Lake Leelanau, which has been continuously gushing since 1867. Fountain Point includes a historic resort and other private residences.

== See also ==
- Fountain Point Resort
