= M-22 (Michigan highway) =

State highway in Michigan, United States

M-22
- M-22 highlighted in red

Route information
- Maintained by MDOT
- Length: 116.651 mi (187.732 km)
- Existed: c. July 1, 1919–present
- Tourist routes: Lake Michigan Circle Tour; Leelanau Scenic Heritage Route; M-22 Pure Michigan Byway

Major junctions
- South end: US 31 near Manistee
- M-115 at Frankfort; M-72 at Empire; M-204 near Lake Leelanau; M-201 at Northport; M-204 at Suttons Bay; M-72 in Greilickville
- North end: US 31 / M-37 / M-72 in Traverse City

Location
- Country: United States
- State: Michigan
- Counties: Manistee, Benzie, Leelanau, Grand Traverse

Highway system
- Michigan State Trunkline Highway System; Interstate; US; State; Byways
← M-21A	→ US 23

M-22 is a state trunkline highway in the US state of Michigan. It is 116.7 miles (187.8 km) long and follows the Lake Michigan shoreline of the Leelanau Peninsula, making up a portion of the Lake Michigan Circle Tour. It also passes through the Sleeping Bear Dunes National Lakeshore. The highway is U-shaped as it rounds the peninsula running through tourist areas in Leland and Suttons Bay in addition to the national lakeshore.

M-22 is an original trunkline designation dating back to the 1919 designation of the system. Reroutings have moved the highway closer to the water between Suttons Bay and Traverse City. A section of the highway was used temporarily for another highway, M-109. Two sections of the highway have been designated as separate Pure Michigan Byways. The highway marker is used in marketing by a local business as a symbol of the region, a trademark for which has been the subject of legal controversies. A popular roadway in the area with tourists, the highway's marker has also been the subject of sign theft.

== Route description ==
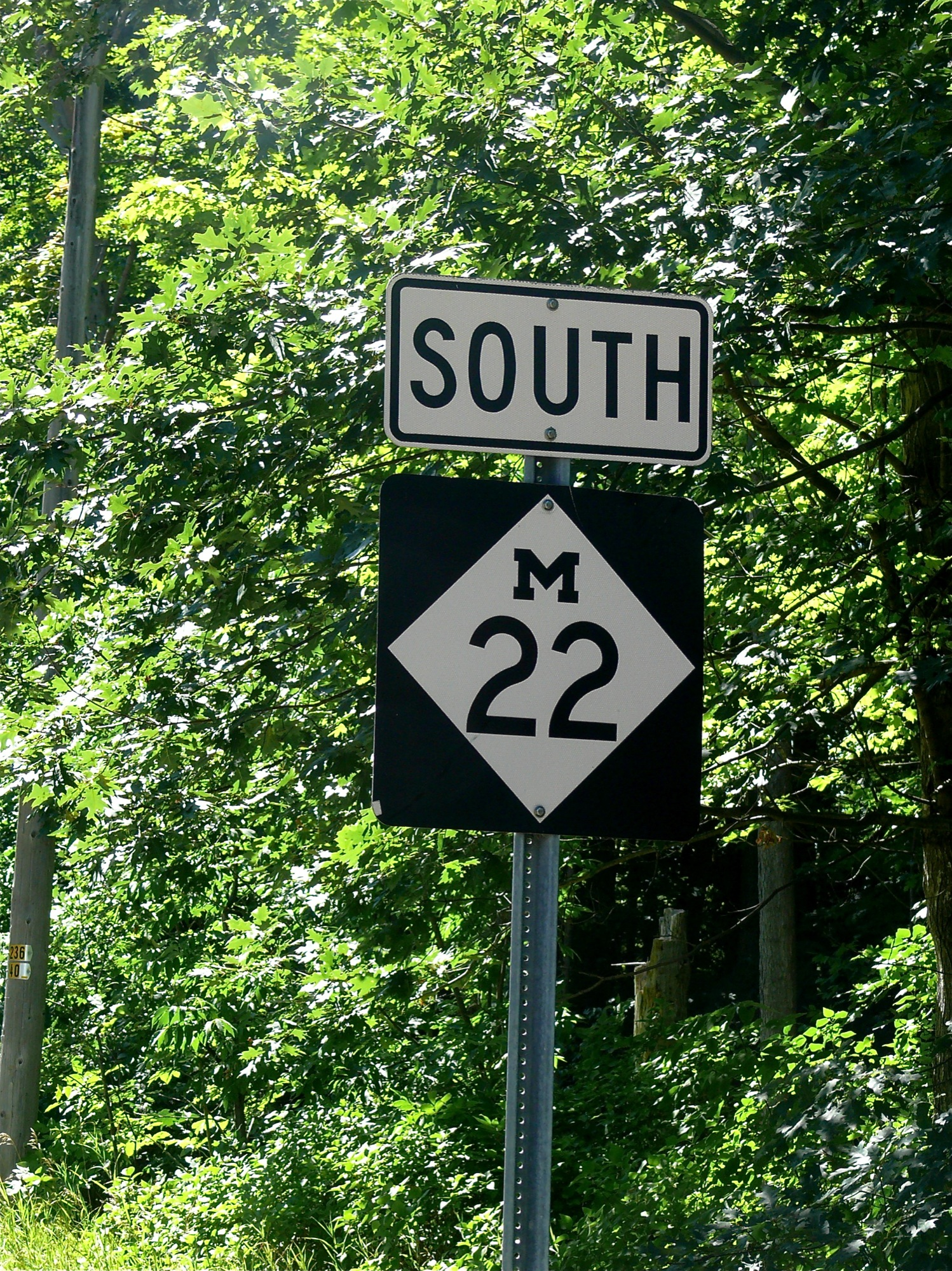
Marker at Good Harbor, south of Leland

The southern terminus is at US Highway 31 (US 31) three miles (4.8 km) northeast of Manistee and the northern terminus is in Traverse City. In between the trunkline loops north along Lake Michigan to Northport before turning south along the West Arm of Grand Traverse Bay. The road itself comprises numerous turns and hills, making it a very popular drive for tourists visiting the area from areas such as Chicago and Detroit, especially during autumn. The road runs north to the village of Onekama running east and north of Portage Lake before returning north to Arcadia. M-22 turns northeasterly to curve around the north shore of Crystal Lake after passing through Elberta and Frankfort. South of the Platte River, the highway crosses into the Sleeping Bear Dunes National Lakeshore. East of Platte Lake, M-22 turns northward again toward Empire, headquarters of the national park. M-22 takes the inland route between Little and Big Glen lakes, losing the Lake Michigan Circle Tour designation to M-109 until the two meet again in Glen Arbor. The roadway follows the shoreline of Pyramid Point and passes east out of the national park before turning north to Leland.

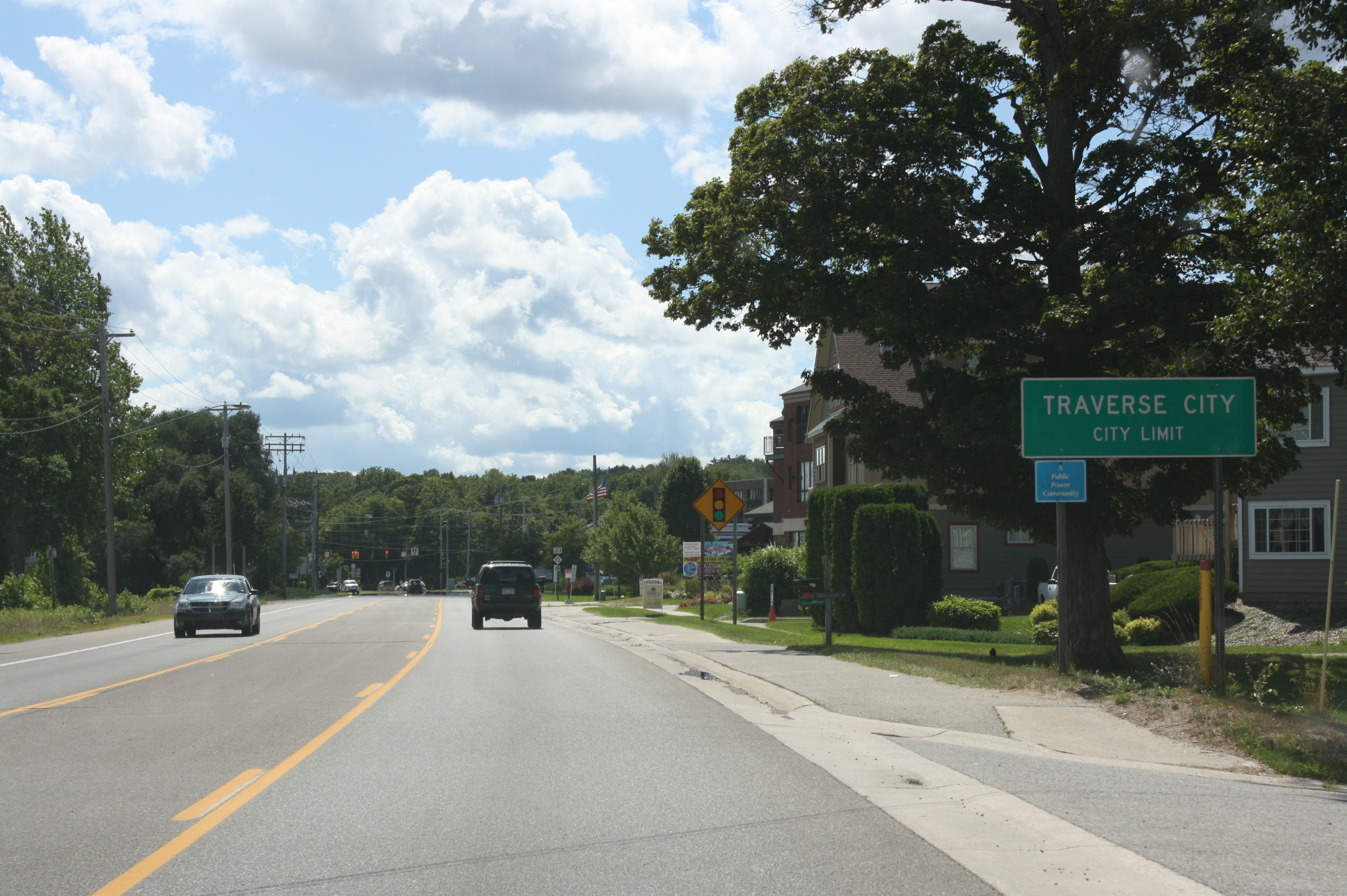
Crossing into Traverse City

Continuing northward, M-22 reaches its northernmost extent in Northport before turning south. It passes through the reservation of the Grand Traverse Band of Chippewa and Ottawa Indians in Peshawbestown, home to one of the tribe's two casinos. Further south is the community of Suttons Bay located on the small bay of the same name. From here south, the highway runs just off the shore of the Grand Traverse Bay south to Greilickville. Just south of Greilickville, M-22 enters a section of the city of Traverse City that is located in Leelanau County, Michigan formed by an acquisition of a neighborhood of Greilickville. Here is the eastern junction between M-22 and M-72. The two highways run concurrently along Grandview Parkway to Division Street. There they meet US 31/M-37 and M-22 ends. A portion of this road has been designated a what is now called a Pure Michigan Scenic Byway by the state of Michigan.

== Cultural references ==
Broneah Kiteboarding, a company based in Traverse City, has adopted the M-22 marker as a logo and sells merchandise such as clothing and bumper stickers featuring it. As such, the logo has become a popular symbol for the company as well as a cultural symbol for the western Grand Traverse Bay area. The private corporation has attempted to trademark the road sign, which has been legally opposed by the Michigan Attorney General Bill Schuette; that formal opposition was removed by his successor Dana Nessel in 2019.

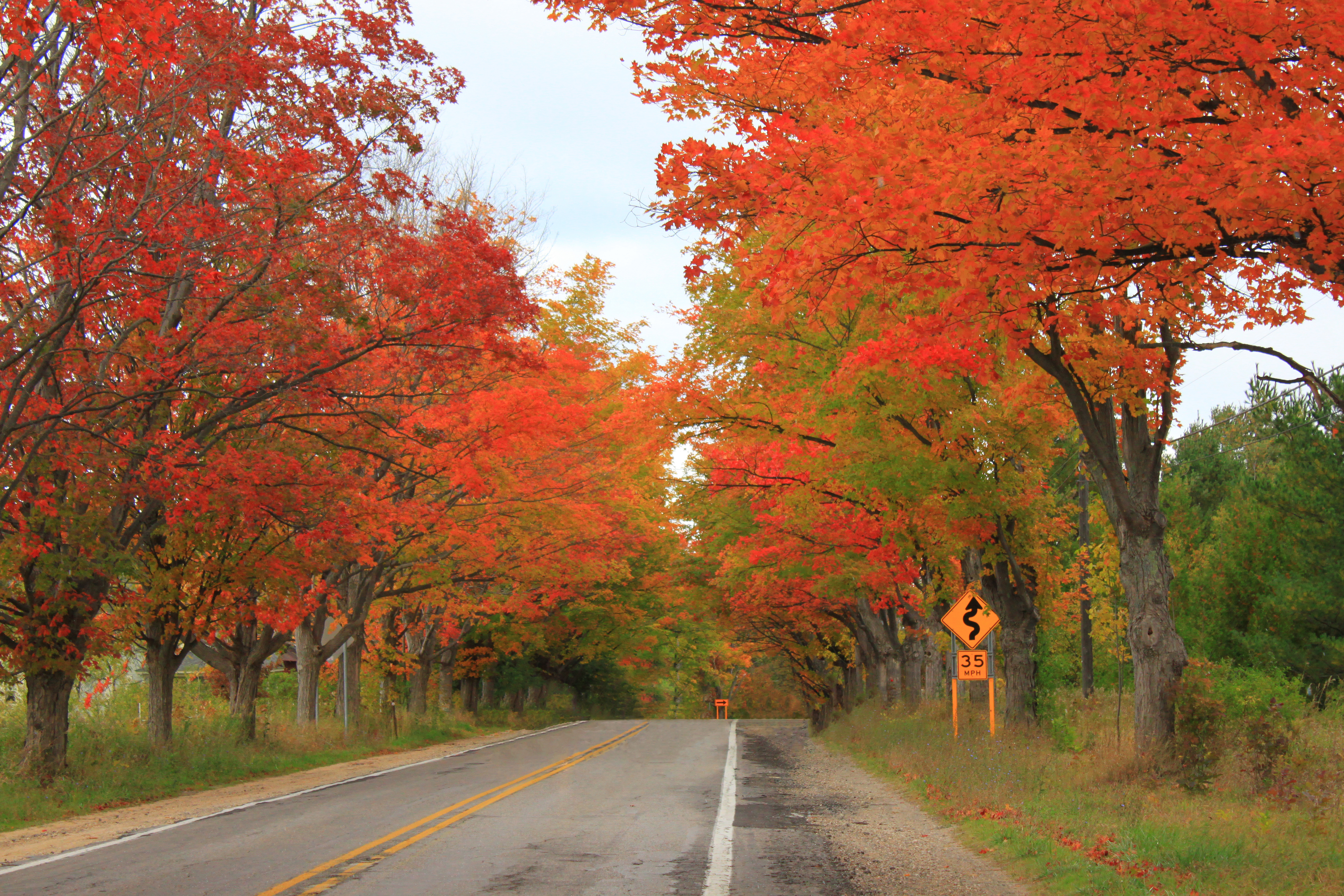
Fall colors along M-22 south of Leland, October 2015

In 2015, the readers of USA Today voted M-22 the "best scenic autumn drive" in the nation, noting that it offers "116 miles [187 km] of stellar autumn leaf-peeping".

Due to the popularity of the roadway, sign theft along parts of M-22 has become an issue for MDOT. The department announced in 2016 that it was removing the "M" from the top of some of the M-22 markers to combat the issue. The state had replaced about 90 signs in the previous three years, and a department spokesman said the popularity of the highway from merchandise sales and scenic travelers factored into those thefts. The new signs cost between $325 and $350 apiece to manufacture, no different from what the standard M-22 signs cost, and MDOT hoped that the modified signs will prove less popular with thieves. The new signs will be installed as replacements in the areas with the most thefts, like Leelanau County, while the rest of the highway will still receive the standard M-22 marker. A year later, sign theft was still an issue. The department started testing pavement markings because the other efforts had failed. The markings cost $175, but they last only three years compared to the ten-year lifespan of a sign.

== History ==
M-22 is an original trunkline, dating to the July 1, 1919 designation of the system. In 1929, the highway was rerouted along the west side of Little Glen Lake, using the modern M-109 around the lake. M-22 would be rerouted back around to the present routing the next year, and M-109 was designated on the west side of the lake in its place.

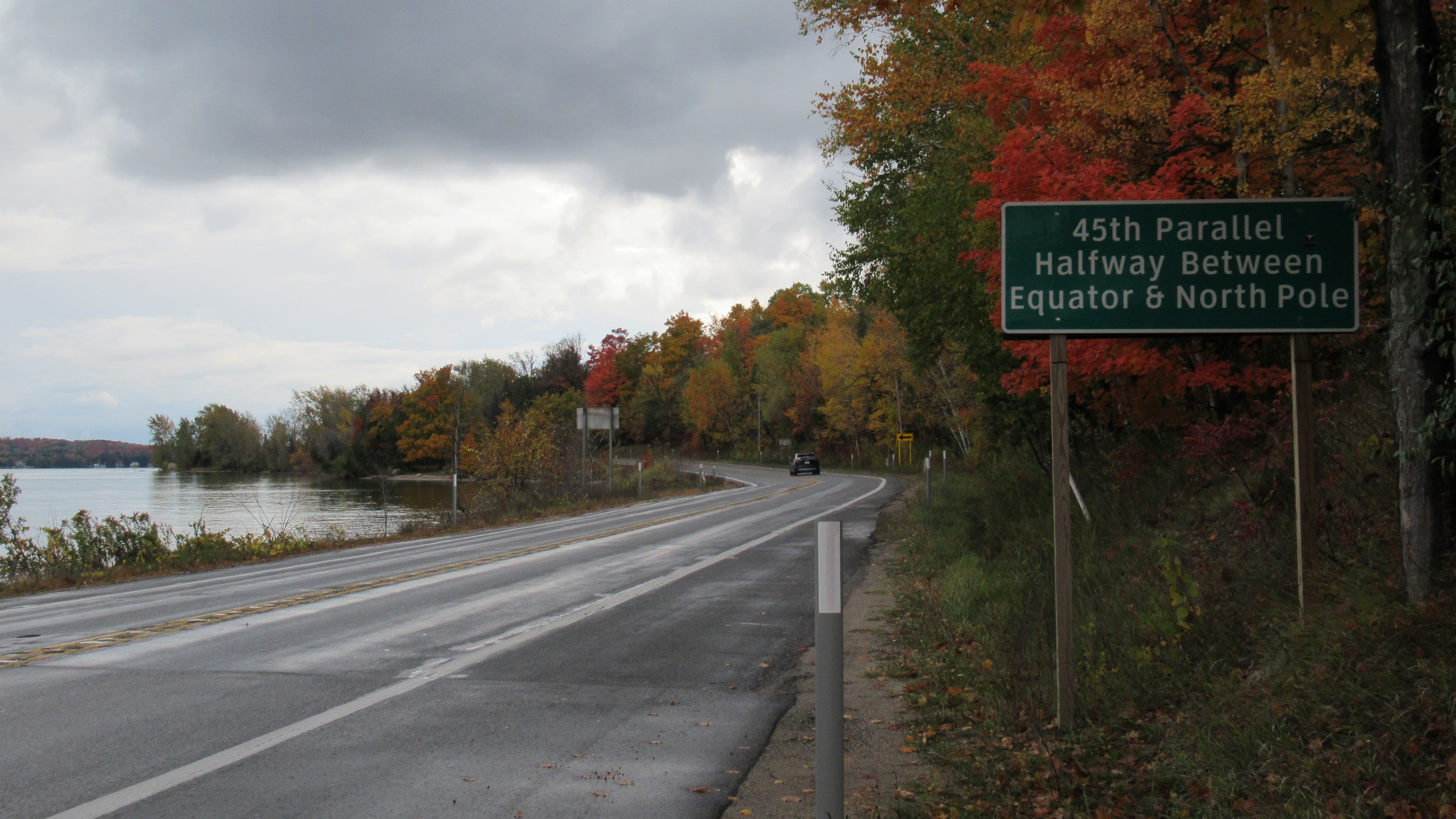
M-22 crossing the 45th parallel near Suttons Bay

Until 1936, M-22's route was on Cherry Bend and Center roads in Leelanau County to Suttons Bay. At that time, M-22 was relocated along the west arm of Grand Traverse Bay onto Center Road up to Crain Hill Road In 1949, M-22 was relocated the rest of the way to Suttons Bay, and the former M-22 on Cherry Bend and Center roads became County Road 633. and in 1945, the last gravel stretch of M-22 from Leland to Northport was paved.

In Traverse City, M-22 originally started at Front and Union streets going west on Front to Elmwood, turning north onto Elmwood, then west on Bay Street to Greilickville. It was relocated onto the newly built Grand View Parkway in 1952, from Greilickville to Division Street (relocated US 31). In 2002, the route of M-22 from the Benzie–Leelanau county line northward to Northport and then south to Traverse City was designated as part of a Michigan Heritage Route along with M-109 and M-204 as the Leelanau Scenic Heritage Route; this moniker was renamed Pure Michigan Byway at the end of 2014. The remainder of the highway was designated as a separate byway in October 2016.

== Major intersections ==
County	Location	mi	km	Destinations	Notes
Manistee	Manistee Township	0.000	0.000	US 31 / LMCT south – Manistee, Traverse City	Southern end of LMCT concurrency
Benzie	Elberta	17.793	28.635	Frankfort Avenue	Eastern terminus of the former M-168
Benzie	Frankfort	20.006	32.197	M-115 east – Benzonia	Western terminus of M-115
Leelanau	Empire	51.849	83.443	M-72 east – Traverse City	Western terminus of M-72
Leelanau	Empire Township	53.911	86.761	M-109 north – Glen Haven	Southern terminus of M-109
Leelanau	Glen Arbor	59.576	95.878	M-109 south – Glen Haven	Eastern terminus of M-109
Leelanau	Leland Township	76.021	122.344	M-204 east – Lake Leelanau, Suttons Bay	Western terminus of M-204
Leelanau	Northport	89.283	143.687	M-201 north	Southern terminus of M-201
Leelanau	Suttons Bay	100.765	162.166	M-204 west – Lake Leelanau, Leland	Eastern terminus of M-204
Leelanau–Grand Traverse county line	Traverse City	116.071	186.798	M-72 west – Empire	Northern end of M-72 concurrency
Grand Traverse	Traverse City	116.651	187.732	US 31 / M-37 / M-72 east / LMCT north – Manistee, Baldwin, Charlevoix, Grayling	Southern end of M-72 concurrency; northern end of LMCT concurrency
1.000 mi = 1.609 km; 1.000 km = 0.621 mi: Concurrency terminus
