= M-204 (Michigan highway) =

State highway in Leelanau County, Michigan, United States

M-204
- M-204 highlighted in red

Route information
- Maintained by MDOT
- Length: 7.220 mi (11.619 km)
- Existed: July 12, 1933–present

Major junctions
- West end: M-22 near Leland
- East end: M-22 near Suttons Bay

Location
- Country: United States
- State: Michigan
- Counties: Leelanau

Highway system
- Michigan State Trunkline Highway System; Interstate; US; State; Byways
← M-203	→ M-205

M-204 is a state trunkline highway that runs across the Leelanau Peninsula between Leland and Suttons Bay in the northwestern Lower Peninsula of the US state of Michigan. The trunkline runs through a rural section of Leelanau County, connecting two villages with the county seat. Originally a gravel road in 1933, it was later paved within the first three years of existence. Segments were realigned to straighten curves in the late 1930s and early 1970s near the villages of Lake Leelanau and Suttons Bay.

== Route description ==
M-204 starts at an intersection with M-22 (Manitou Trail) south of Leland next to Duck Lake. From there it follows Duck Lake Road along the south shore of Lake Leelanau's northern lobe. The two-lane roadway runs eastward and then southeasterly through a mixture of woods and fields to the village of Lake Leelanau. One there, M-204 follows Phillip Street across the Narrows and turns northeasterly. The bridge that the trunkline uses is eligible for listing on the National Register of Historic Places. Outside of town, the highway follows Duck Lake Road again past the county seat of Leelanau County. Near the intersection with Horn Road, M-204 turns southeasterly toward the village of Suttons Bay. As the trunkline descends a hill into the village, it passes through vineyards and woods. Inside town, M-204 follows Race Street and ends downtown at M-22 (St. Joseph Avenue).

Like other state highways in Michigan, M-204 is maintained by the Michigan Department of Transportation (MDOT). In 2011, the department's traffic surveys showed that on average, 3,397 vehicles used the highway daily in Suttons Bay and 2,931 vehicles did so each day near the western terminus, the highest and lowest counts along the highway, respectively. No section of M-204 is listed on the National Highway System, a network of roads important to the country's economy, defense, and mobility.

== History ==
M-204 was first designated on July 12, 1933 between Leland and Suttons Bay along what is today Duck Lake Road. The highway was paved by the middle of 1936. The road was realigned on July 13, 1939, across the narrows of Lake Leelanau in the village of the same name. Another realignment near Suttons Bay was completed on March 26, 1956, to smooth out a curve in the road. A second completed on May 4, 1956, straightened a curve by Sylt Road east of Lake Leelanau. The western section was completely rebuilt between Duck Lake Corner and the Lake Leelanau Narrows Bridge to smooth out curves in the roadway. Sections not obliterated by the reconstruction were turned over to local control as Main Street or Old M-204 in Lake Leelanau when the project was finished on July 1, 1970.

== Major intersections ==
The entire highway is in Leelanau County.

Location	mi	km	Destinations	Notes
Leland	0.000	0.000	M-22 / LMCT (Manitou Trail) – Empire, Leland, Northport	
Suttons Bay	7.220	11.619	M-22 / LMCT (St. Joseph Avenue) – Traverse City, Northport	
1.000 mi = 1.609 km; 1.000 km = 0.621 mi
