= Leland River =

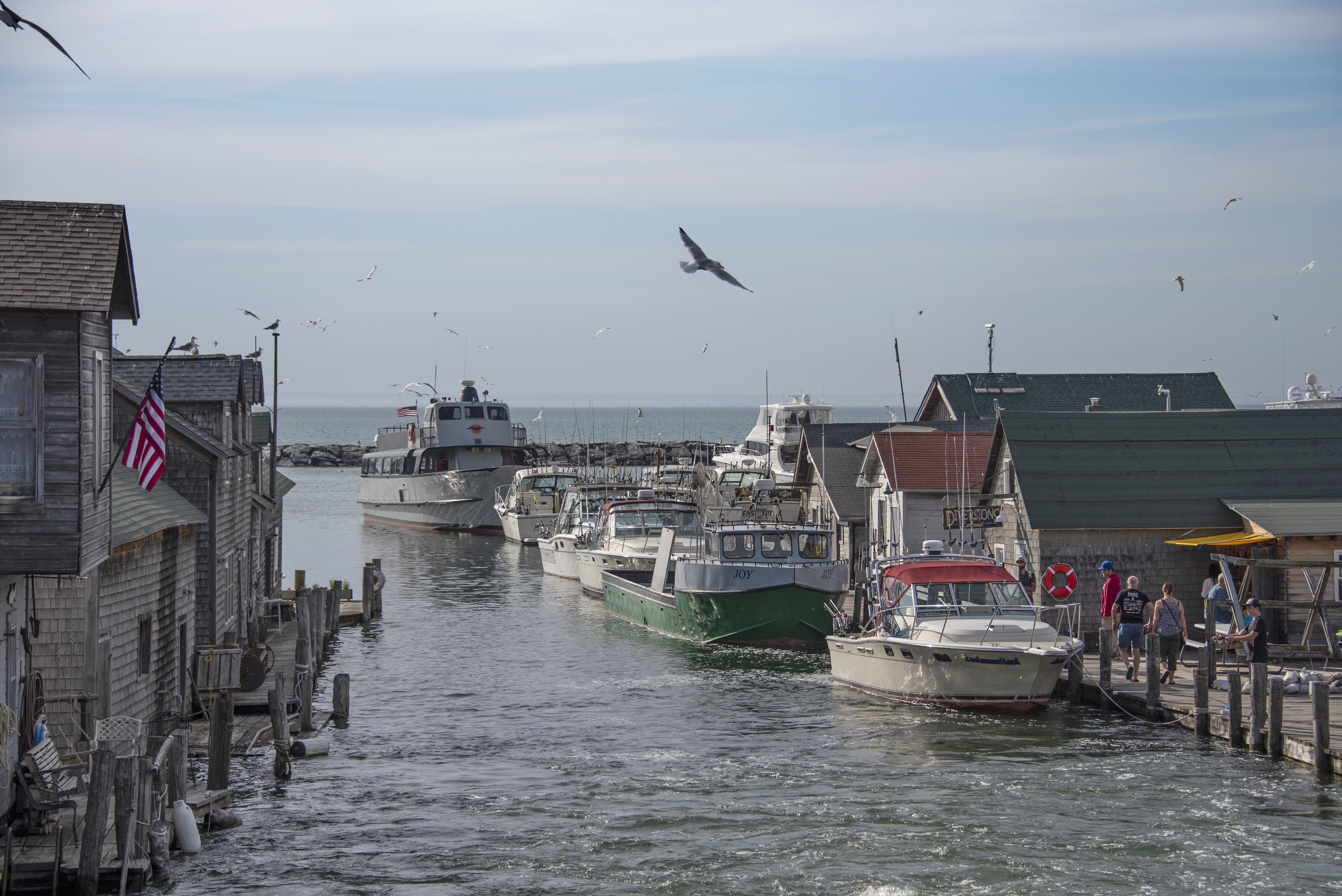
- Leland River in Leland, shortly above its mouth.

Physical characteristics
- Source
  - location: Lake Leelanau
  - coordinates: 45.0153°N 85.7586°W
- Mouth
  - location: Lake Michigan
  - coordinates: 45.0236°N 85.7623°W
- Length: 0.9 mi (1.4 km)

The Leland River is a short river in the U.S. state of Michigan. Located in the unincorporated community of Leland, the river is 0.9 miles (1.4 km) long and connects Lake Leelanau with Lake Michigan, winding past historic Fishtown, a dam and two restaurants. The dam was built in 1854 and it raised the water level in the river and in Lake Leelanau as much as 12 feet (3.7 m). As the dam prevents boat traffic, launches are provided on both sides.

The river was formerly known as Carp River, a term that is still often used today.
