= Suttons Bay, Michigan =

- Village
- Village of Suttons Bay
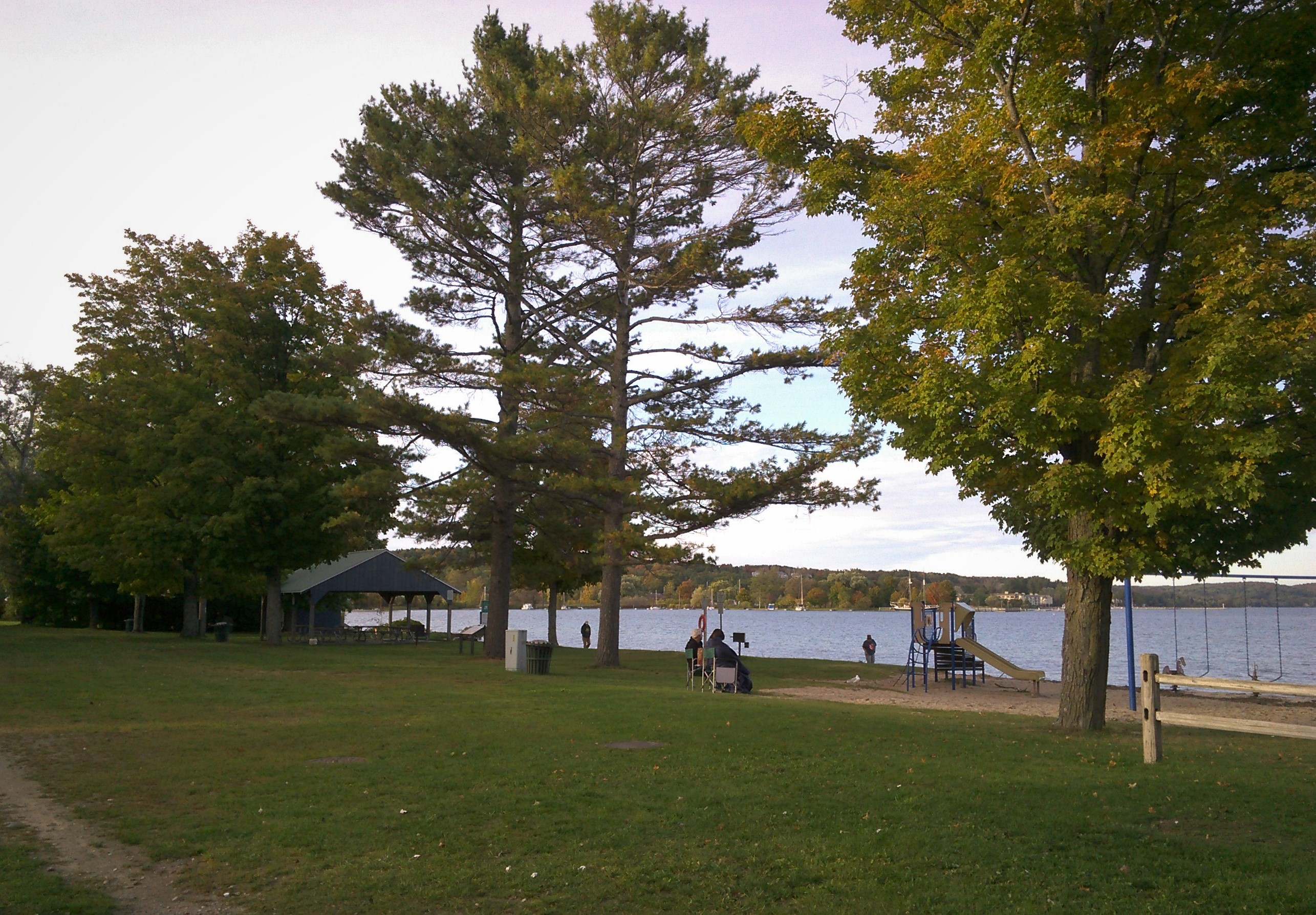
- Sutton Park, on the shores of the eponymous Suttons Bay, an inlet of Grand Traverse Bay

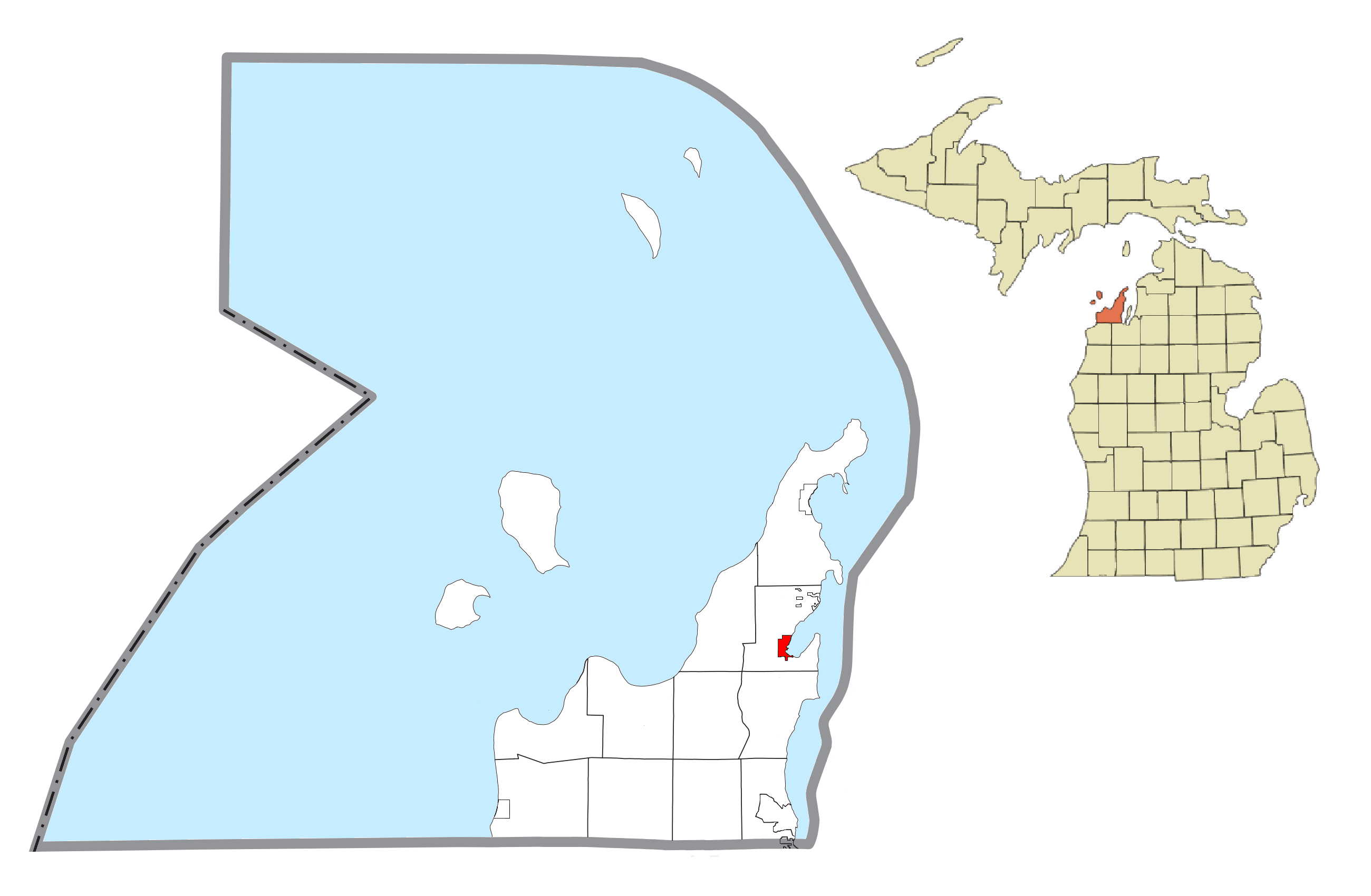
- Location within Leelanau County

- Location within the state of Michigan Location within the United States
- Coordinates: 44°58′30″N 85°39′04″W
- Country: United States
- State: Michigan
- County: Leelanau
- Township: Suttons Bay
- Founded: 1854
- Incorporated: 1898

Government
  - Type: Village council
  - President: Steve Lutke
  - Clerk: Shar Fay

Area
  - Total: 1.29 sq mi (3.33 km^{2})
  - Land: 1.29 sq mi (3.33 km^{2})
  - Water: 0 sq mi (0.00 km^{2})
- Elevation: 597 ft (182 m)

Population (2020)
  - Total: 613
  - Density: 477.2/sq mi (184.26/km^{2})
- Time zone: UTC-5 (EST)
  - Summer (DST): UTC-4 (EDT)
- ZIP code(s): 49682
- Area code: 231
- FIPS code: 26-77600
- GNIS feature ID: 0639135
- Website: Official website

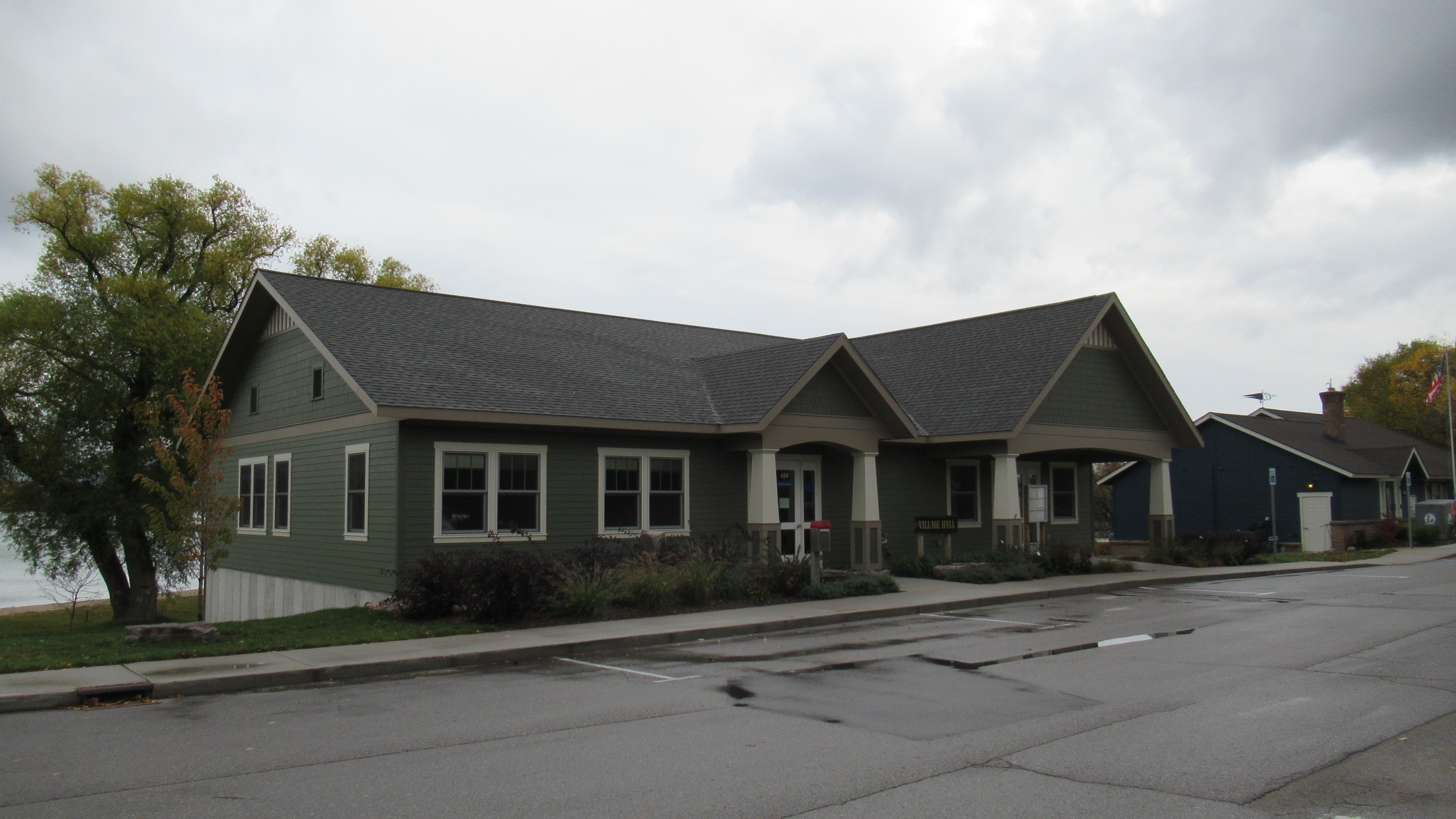
Suttons Bay Village Hall

Suttons Bay is a village in Leelanau County in the U.S. state of Michigan. The population in the village reached 613 at the 2020 census. Located within Suttons Bay Township, the community lies upon the shore of the eponymous Suttons Bay, a smaller inlet of Grand Traverse Bay, a bay of Lake Michigan.

== History ==
The community is named for one of the first settlers of European descent, Harry C. Sutton, who arrived in 1854. He arrived with a crew of woodsmen to supply fuel for passing wood steamboats.

In 1903 the Traverse City, Leelanau, and Manistique Railroad began a route between Traverse City to the South and Northport to the North, stopping at Suttons Bay, as well as Hatch's Crossing, Fountain Point, Bingham, Keswick, and Omena.

Before the turn of the 20th century, four churches had been established—two Lutheran, one Roman Catholic, and one Congregational.

In 1920, Leelanau County voters approved moving the county seat to Suttons Bay, but the move never took place.

Suttons Bay has a school; the sports mascot is a Viking, hence the nickname "Suttons Bay Norsemen."

The town is home to the county's only movie theater, opened in 1946. It was owned by Bob Bahle, and was renovated in 1977. Its fare consists of unique art house films, and occasionally the theater hosts plays and concerts.

The town has a clothing store that has been owned by one family over four generations called "Bahles." The original store started as a "dry-goods" business in 1876 by Lars Bahle, an immigrant from Norway.

Suttons Bay is also home to one of the oldest continuously operated food establishments in the entire region. Since 1871, the restaurant has gone through several owners and is currently known as The V I Grill.

== Culture ==
Like many other communities in northern Michigan, Suttons Bay relies heavily on tourism to generate revenues for its economy.

Activities include the Suttons Bay Jazzfest and the Suttons Bay Art Festival.

Suttons Bay also is highly embedded in the cherry industry, producing sweet and tart cherries of many varieties. Harvest operations usually take place in mid-July and run into August.

In August 2013, the community held an event to attempt to break the Guinness Book of World Records for most kayaks and canoes rafted together. The effort followed an attempt a year earlier, which missed the record of 1902 boats set by a group near Inlet, New York in 2011.

Suttons Bay is home to the historic The Bay Theatre.

== Geography ==
According to the United States Census Bureau, the village has a total area of 1.25 square miles (3.24 km^{2}), all land. The town is located on the shore of Suttons Bay, an inlet Grand Traverse Bay, itself an inlet of Lake Michigan. The town is fifteen miles north of Traverse City.

Just north of the village is a sign marking the 45th parallel north, halfway between the North Pole and the Equator. This is one of six Michigan sites, and 29 in the U.S., where such signs are known to exist.

=== Major highways ===
- M-22 runs north–south through Suttons Bay, paralleling the shore of the Grand Traverse Bay. North of Suttons Bay, M-22 runs to Northport, before turning south and running along Lake Michigan.
- M-204 runs west from Suttons Bay, cutting across the Leelanau Peninsula via Lake Leelanau to M-22 near Leland.

== Demographics ==
Historical population
Census	Pop.	Note	%±
1900	398		—
1910	402		1.0%
1920	392		−2.5%
1930	439		12.0%
1940	470		7.1%
1950	485		3.2%
1960	421		−13.2%
1970	522		24.0%
1980	504		−3.4%
1990	561		11.3%
2000	589		5.0%
2010	618		4.9%
2020	613		−0.8%
U.S. Decennial Census

=== 2010 census ===
As of the census of 2010, there were 618 people, 273 households, and 175 families residing in the village. The population density was 494.4 inhabitants per square mile (190.9/km^{2}). There were 453 housing units at an average density of 362.4 per square mile (139.9/km^{2}). The racial makeup of the village was 93.7% White, 0.2% African American, 2.8% Native American, 1.1% Asian, and 2.3% from two or more races. Hispanic or Latino of any race were 0.3% of the population.

There were 273 households, of which 16.1% had children under the age of 18 living with them, 54.6% were married couples living together, 6.2% had a female householder with no husband present, 3.3% had a male householder with no wife present, and 35.9% were non-families. 32.2% of all households were made up of individuals, and 15.1% had someone living alone who was 65 years of age or older. The average household size was 2.02 and the average family size was 2.48.

The median age in the village was 58.8 years. 12.8% of residents were under the age of 18; 3.5% were between the ages of 18 and 24; 14.5% were from 25 to 44; 29.8% were from 45 to 64; and 39.3% were 65 years of age or older. The gender makeup of the village was 44.7% male and 55.3% female.

=== 2000 census ===
As of the census of 2000, there were 589 people, 271 households, and 179 families residing in the village. The population density was 538.7 inhabitants per square mile (208.0/km^{2}). There were 374 housing units at an average density of 342.0 per square mile (132.0/km^{2}). The racial makeup of the village was 96.94% White, 0.34% African American, 1.19% Native American, 0.34% Asian, 1.02% from other races, and 0.17% from two or more races. Hispanic or Latino of any race were 2.72% of the population.

There were 271 households, out of which 21.8% had children under the age of 18 living with them, 56.1% were married couples living together, 7.4% had a female householder with no husband present, and 33.6% were non-families. 28.8% of all households were made up of individuals, and 12.5% had someone living alone who was 65 years of age or older. The average household size was 2.17 and the average family size was 2.62.

In the village, the population was spread out, with 19.5% under the age of 18, 4.6% from 18 to 24, 20.7% from 25 to 44, 32.6% from 45 to 64, and 22.6% who were 65 years of age or older. The median age was 47 years. For every 100 females, there were 92.5 males. For every 100 females age 18 and over, there were 90.4 males.

The median income for a household in the village was $44,063, and the median income for a family was $52,321. Males had a median income of $38,173 versus $22,045 for females. The per capita income for the village was $24,097. About 3.6% of families and 6.0% of the population were below the poverty line, including 8.4% of those under age 18 and 3.8% of those age 65 or over.
