= Lake Leelanau =

Lake in Leelanau County, Michigan, United States of America

- North Lake Leelanau, South Lake Leelanau; Carp Lake
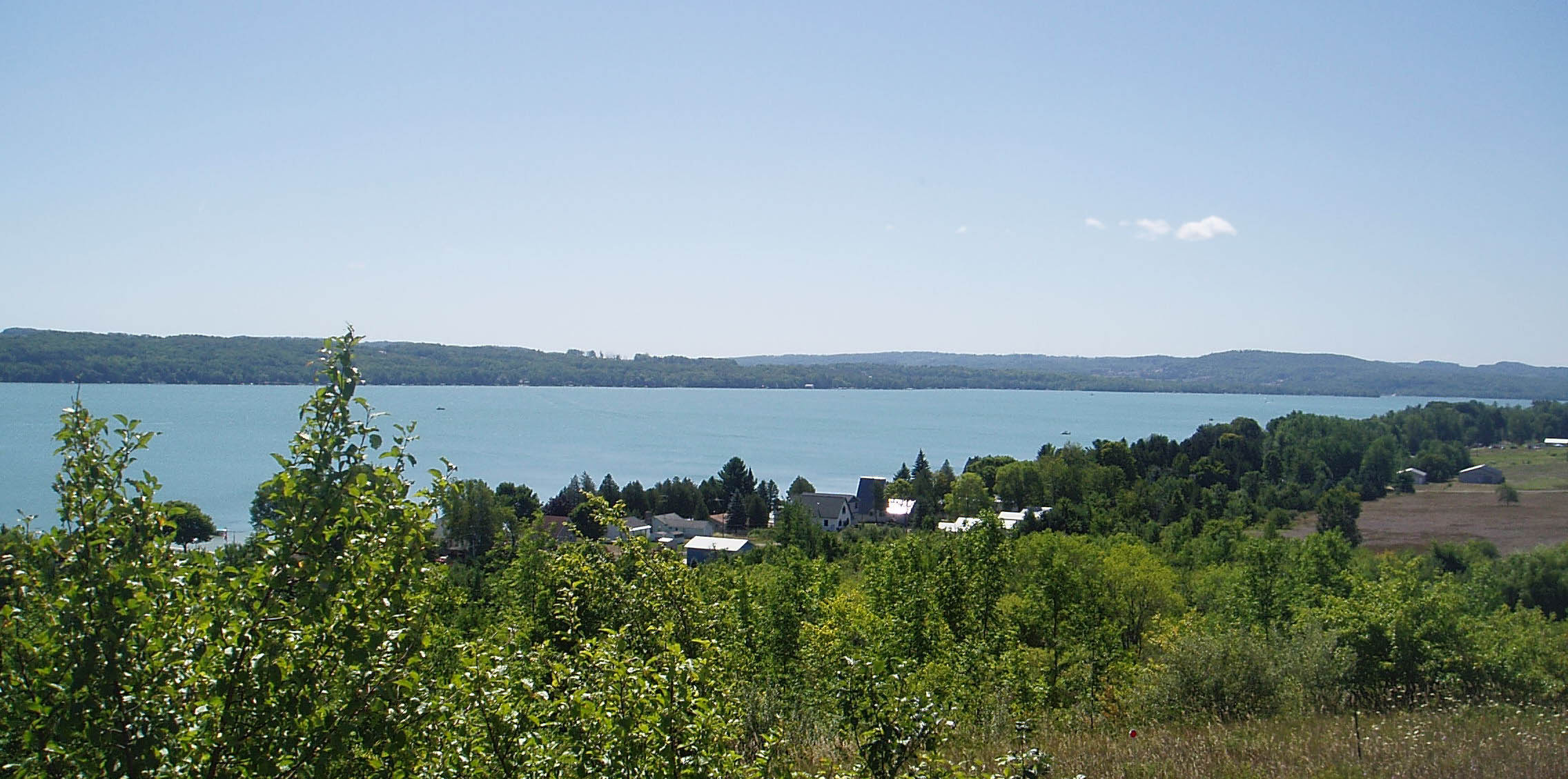
- The southern basin of Lake Leelanau

- Location within Michigan
- Location: Leelanau County, Michigan
- Coordinates: 45°0′N 85°44′W
- Primary inflows: Cedar Run, Victoria Creek
- Primary outflows: Leland River
- Basin countries: United States
- Max. width: 1.5 miles (2.4 km)
- Surface area: 2,914 acres (12 km^{2}) North; 5,693 acres (23 km^{2}) South
- Max. depth: 121 ft (37 m) North; 62 ft (19 m) South
- Surface elevation: 587 feet (179 m)
- Settlements: Leland, Lake Leelanau, Fountain Point, Cedar

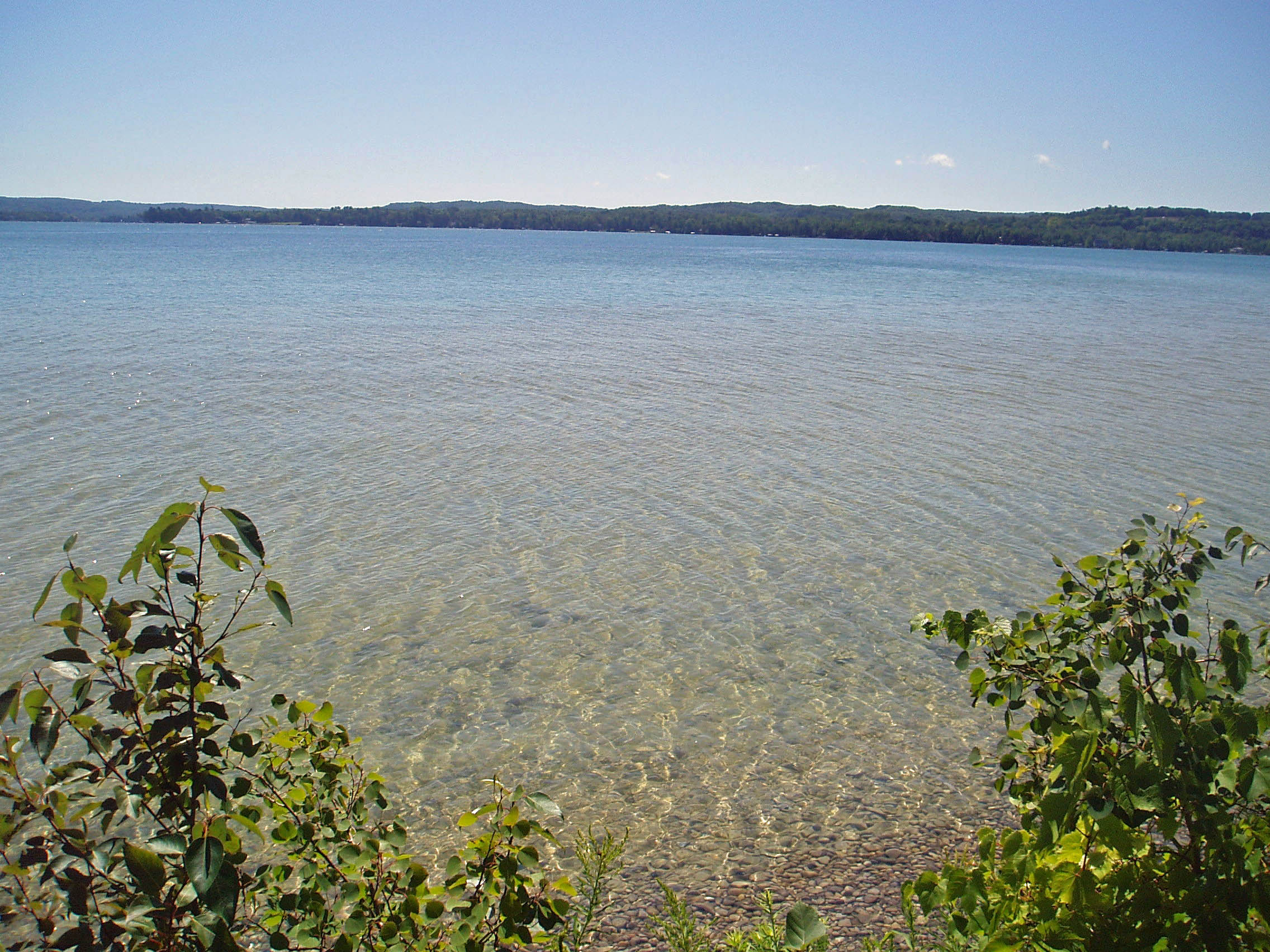
Lake Leelanau North

Lake Leelanau (/ˈliːlənɔː/ LEE-lə-naw) is a lake that is located in the Leelanau Peninsula of the U.S. state of Michigan. The lake is divided into two basins, usually referred to as North Lake Leelanau and South Lake Leelanau, which are divided by the Lake Leelanau Narrows in the community of Lake Leelanau. The entire lake covers about 8,608 acres (35 km^{2}). The lake is drained by the Leland River, which flows to Lake Michigan in the community of Leland.

Lake Leelanau is also occasionally referred to as Carp Lake.

== Location ==
Lake Leelanau connects on the northwest to the Leland River, which runs for one mile (1.6 km) to Lake Michigan. Between North Lake Leelanau and South Lake Leelanau the water narrows for about a mile near the unincorporated community of Lake Leelanau.

A bridge crosses the narrows on M-204. Just south of the bridge is Fountain Point, a historic and scenic landmark as well as a popular summer resort.

On the southern end, South Lake Leelanau ends in a marshy area fed by several small creeks, and the waters access the community of Cedar in Solon Township.

Lake Leelanau runs 16.3 miles (26 km) through the middle of the Leelanau Peninsula; it is about 1.5 miles (2.4 km) at its widest. The south lake includes 5,693 acres (23 km^{2}), the north lake includes 2,914 acres (12 km^{2}), and the lakes have a total shoreline of about 41.2 miles (66.3 km). The south lake has an average depth of 24 feet (7.3 m), and a maximum depth of 62 feet (19 m); the north lake has an average depth of 40 feet (12 m) and a maximum depth of 121 feet (37 m).

== History ==
Indigenous people who first inhabited the area called this land "ke-ski-bi-ag," which means "narrow body of water,".

Henry Rowe Schoolcraft, an Indigenous agent for the territory, was credited with formally naming the county, and was said to use Leelinau as a character in his writing. See Leelanau County for a more complete discussion of the etymology of the name.

Scholars have established, however, that Leelinau was first used as a pen name by Schoolcraft's wife Jane Johnston Schoolcraft in writings for The Literary Voyager, a family magazine which she and her husband wrote together in the 1820s. Jane Johnston was of Ojibwa and Scots-Irish descent, and wrote in Ojibwe and English. While her writing was not published formally in her lifetime (except as Schoolcraft appropriated it under his own name), Jane Johnston Schoolcraft has been recognized as "the first Native American literary writer, the first known Indian woman writer, the first known Indian poet, the first known poet to write poems in a Native American language, and the first known American Indian to write out traditional Indian stories." In 2008 Jane Johnston Schoolcraft was inducted into the Michigan Women's Hall of Fame.

== See also ==
- List of lakes in Michigan
- List of lake monsters
