= M-109 (Michigan highway) =

State highway in Leelanau County, Michigan, United States

M-109
- M-109 highlighted in red

Route information
- Maintained by MDOT
- Length: 6.831 mi (10.993 km)
- Existed: c. May 1, 1929–present

Major junctions
- South end: M-22 near Empire
- North end: M-22 at Glen Arbor

Location
- Country: United States
- State: Michigan
- Counties: Leelanau

Highway system
- Michigan State Trunkline Highway System; Interstate; US; State; Byways
← M-108	→ M-110

M-109 is the designation of a state trunkline highway in the Lower Peninsula of the US state of Michigan that runs between Empire and Glen Arbor. The highway is a loop connected to M-22 at both ends that allows tourists access to Sleeping Bear Dunes National Lakeshore and the Pierce Stocking Scenic Drive located on a section of sandy forest land between Lake Michigan and Glen Lake. The trunkline traverses an area named the "Most Beautiful Place in America" by Good Morning America, the morning show on ABC. The highway was designated by 1929 and fully paved in 1939.

== Route description ==
M-109 starts at an intersection on M-22 north of Empire. The trunkline runs northward along Dune Highway past Maple Grove Cemetery and through woods in the Sleeping Bear Dunes National Lakeshore. The area was named the "Most Beautiful Place in America" by Good Morning America in August 2011; the designation came after a social media campaign to capitalize on the show's website poll. Further north, the highway passes the entrance to Pierce Stocking Scenic Drive before running along the western shore of Glen Lake. Near the northwestern corner of the lake, M-109 passes the entrance to the Dune Climb in an area that's predominantly fields. The trunkline makes a 90-degree turn at the intersection with Glen Haven Road, the former M-209, south of Glen Haven, a former logging town on the shores of Lake Michigan. M-109 turns easterly at the intersection to follow Harbor Highway. It runs through another wooded area between Glen Lake and Sleeping Bear Bay. The highway passes the D.H. Day Campground and enters Glen Arbor, following Western Avenue. At the intersection with M-22 (Ray Street), M-109 terminates in the middle of town.

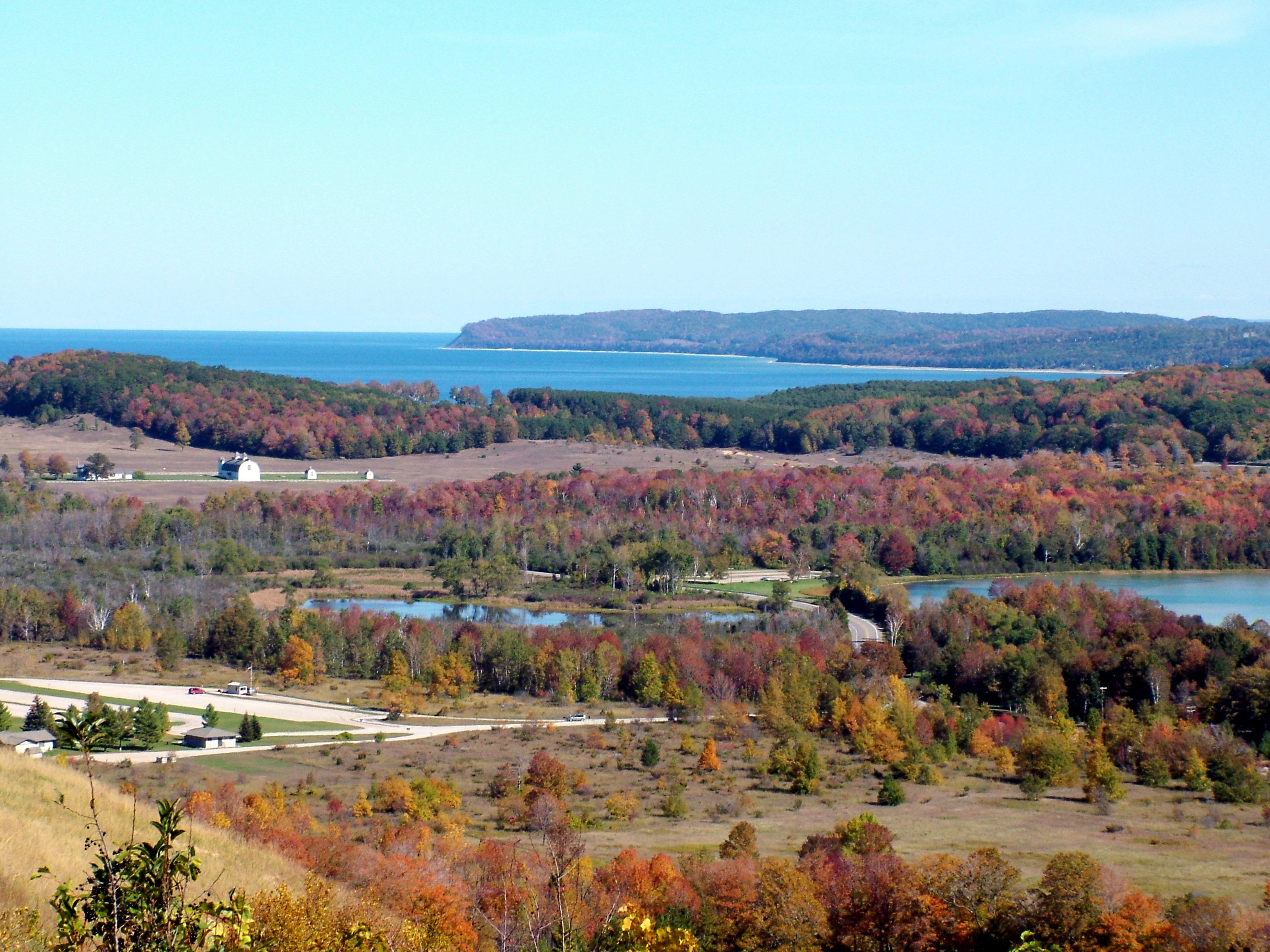
M-109 bisects the two bodies of water (Glen Lake) in the foreground, Sleeping Bear Bay of Lake Michigan in the background

Like other state highways in Michigan, M-109 is maintained by the Michigan Department of Transportation (MDOT). In 2011, the department's traffic surveys showed that on average, 783 vehicles used the highway daily along Dune Highway and 758 vehicles did so each day along Harbor Highway, the highest and lowest counts along the highway, respectively. No section of M-109 is listed on the National Highway System, a network of roads important to the country's economy, defense, and mobility.

== History ==
The first section of roadway to receive the M-109 designation was in place and signed on maps by May 1, 1929. The roadway was a spur from M-22 north of Empire that ended at Glen Haven, just west of the D.H. Day State Park. The highway was extended east along an existing road between Glen Haven and Glen Arbor. This extension was in place by May 1, 1933, completing the modern routing of M-109. The highway was fully paved in 1939.

== Major intersections ==
The entire highway is in Leelanau County.

Location	mi	km	Destinations	Notes
Empire Township	0.000	0.000	M-22 / LMCT – Empire	
Empire Township	1.260	2.028	Pierce Stocking Scenic Drive	
Glen Haven	4.798	7.722	Glen Haven Road	Former M-209
Glen Arbor	6.831	10.993	M-22 / LMCT – Leland	
1.000 mi = 1.609 km; 1.000 km = 0.621 mi
