= Empire Township, Michigan =

- Civil township
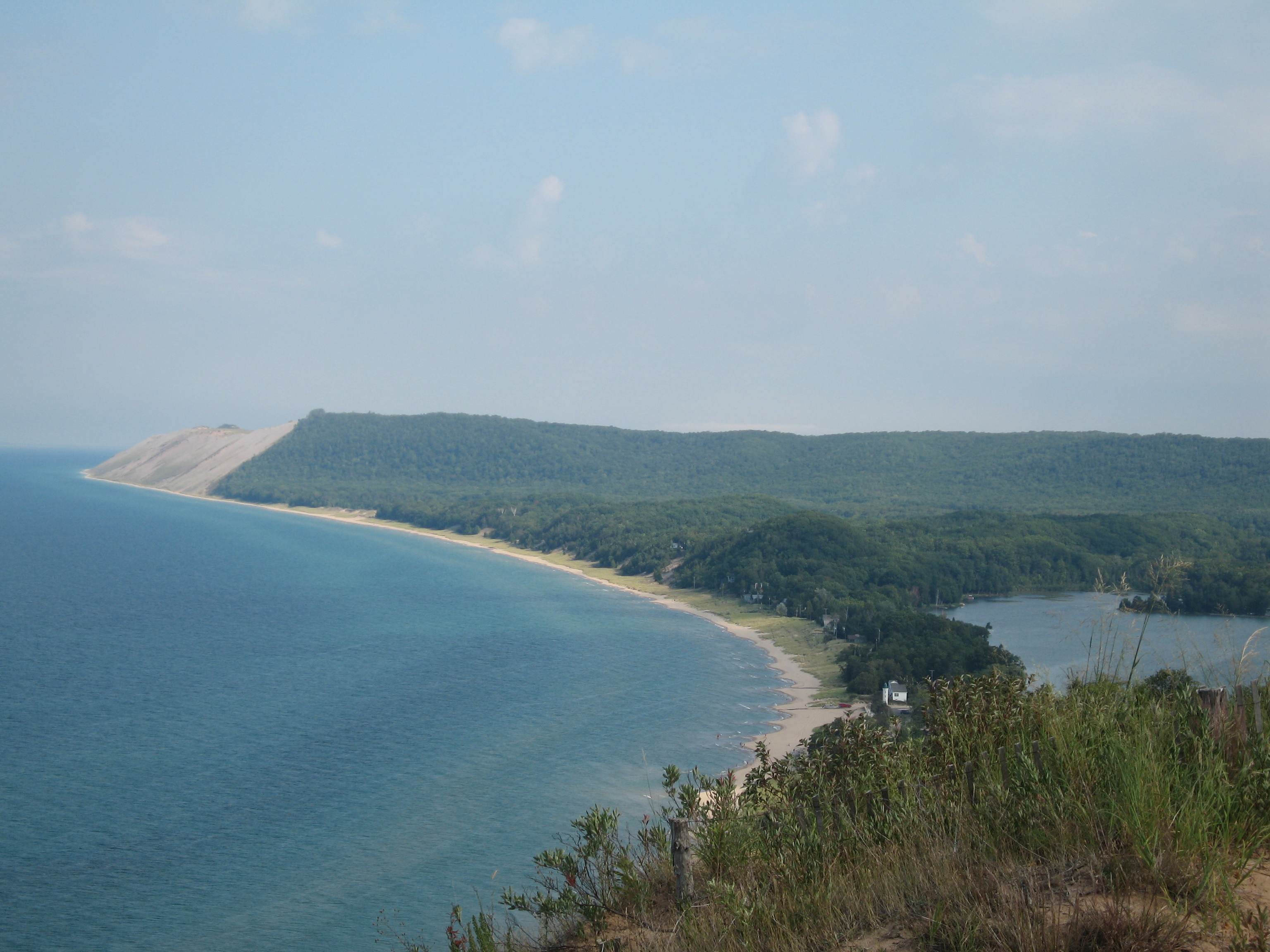
- Lake Michigan (left), Sleeping Bear Dunes, and South Bar Lake (right) from Empire Bluffs

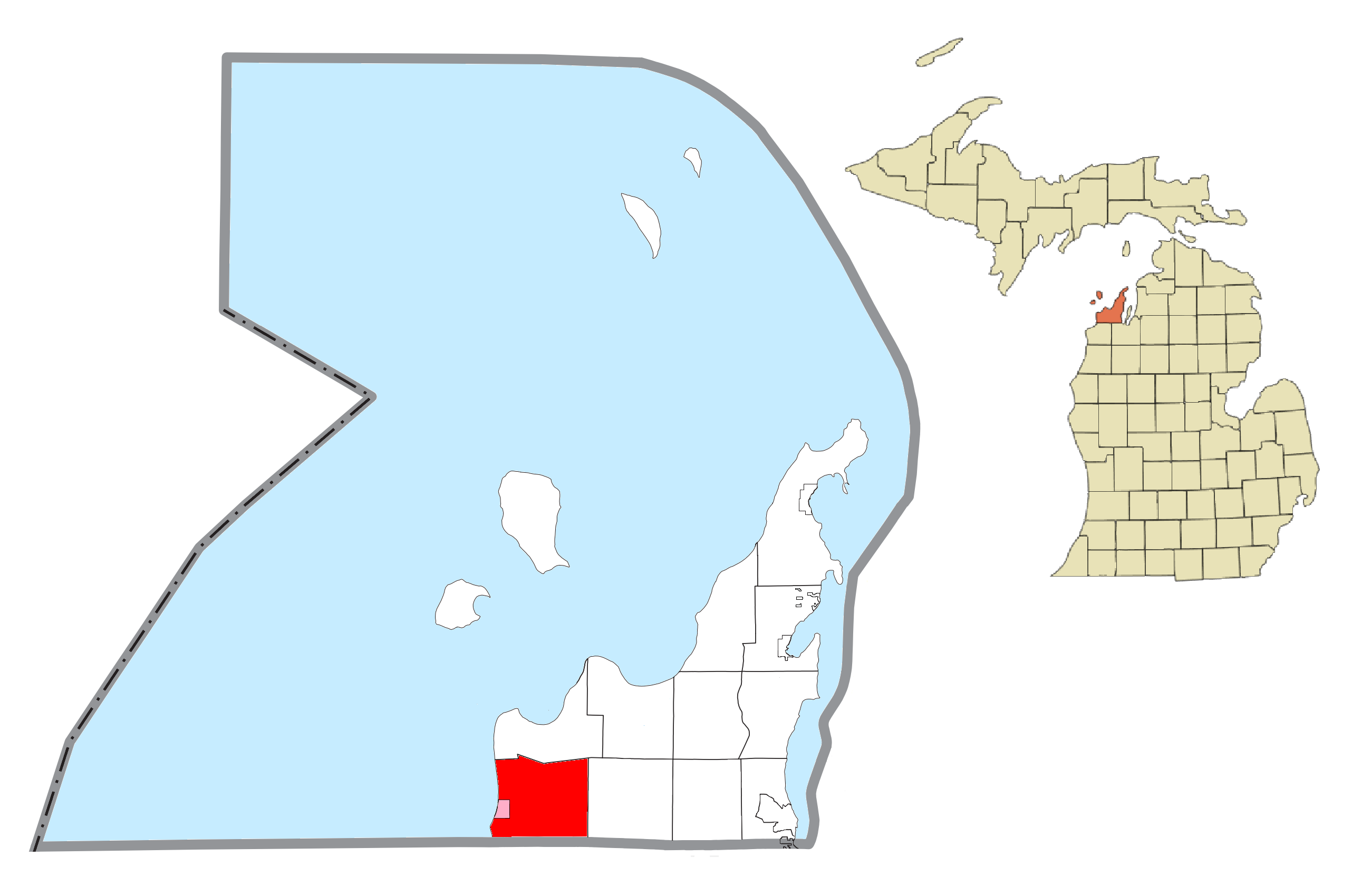
- Location within Leelanau County (red) and the administered village of Empire (pink)

- Location within the state of Michigan Empire Township (the United States)
- Coordinates: 44°50′02″N 86°00′49″W
- Country: United States
- State: Michigan
- County: Leelanau

Area
  - Total: 42.8 sq mi (110.9 km^{2})
  - Land: 35.3 sq mi (91.3 km^{2})
  - Water: 7.6 sq mi (19.6 km^{2})
- Elevation: 961 ft (293 m)

Population (2020)
  - Total: 1,126
  - Density: 31/sq mi (11.9/km^{2})
- Time zone: UTC-5 (Eastern (EST))
  - Summer (DST): UTC-4 (EDT)
- ZIP code(s): 49630 (Empire); 49664 (Maple City)
- Area code: 231
- FIPS code: 26-26000
- GNIS feature ID: 1626241
- Website: www.leelanau.cc

Empire Township is a civil township of Leelanau County in the U.S. state of Michigan. The population was 1,126 at the 2020 census. On the shores of Lake Michigan, Empire Township contains a substantial amount of land within the Sleeping Bear Dunes National Lakeshore.

== History ==
Empire Township was established in 1865.

Sleeping Bear Dunes National Lakeshore was established in 1970, protecting the natural scenery of the area at the federal level.

== Geography ==
According to the United States Census Bureau, the township has a total area of 42.8 square miles (111 km^{2}), of which 35.3 square miles (91 km^{2}) is land and 7.6 square miles (20 km^{2}) (17.66%) is water.

Empire Township contains shorelines on both Lake Michigan and Glen Lake.

=== Major highways ===
- M-22 is a north–south highway paralleling the coast of Lake Michigan. M-22 exits Empire Township south into Benzie County, and north into Glen Arbor Township, over the narrows of Glen Lake.
- M-72 is an east–west highway with its western terminus at M-22 in Empire, less than a mile from Lake Michigan. East of Empire Township, M-72 crosses the Lower Peninsula by way of Traverse City, Kalkaska, Grayling, Mio, and Harrisville, whereupon it ends less than a mile from Lake Huron.
- M-109 is a scenic route adjacent to M-22 that has its southern terminus in Empire Township. The highway travels north through Sleeping Bear Dunes National Lakeshore to Glen Haven, where it turns east and ends at another junction with M-22 in downtown Glen Arbor.

== Communities ==
- Burdickville is an unincorporated community and ghost town on the shore of Glen Lake, at 44°50′56″N 85°56′53.3″W. Burdickville was established in 1864, and abandoned in 1912. Burdickville was founded in 1864 by William D. Burdick.
- The village of Empire is located in the west of the township, on the shore of Lake Michigan.
- Jacktown was a former rail station just north of the Benzie County line along a railroad branch line to Empire.

== Demographics ==
As of the census of 2000, there were 1,085 people, 500 households, and 325 families residing in the township. The population density was 30.8 inhabitants per square mile (11.9/km^{2}). There were 940 housing units at an average density of 26.7 per square mile (10.3/km^{2}). The racial makeup of the township was 98.53% White, 0.65% Native American, 0.18% Asian, 0.09% from other races, and 0.55% from two or more races. Hispanic or Latino of any race were 0.28% of the population.

There were 500 households, out of which 22.8% had children under the age of 18 living with them, 55.8% were married couples living together, 5.6% had a female householder with no husband present, and 35.0% were non-families. 31.6% of all households were made up of individuals, and 13.0% had someone living alone who was 65 years of age or older. The average household size was 2.17 and the average family size was 2.69.

In the township the population was spread out, with 18.8% under the age of 18, 5.3% from 18 to 24, 19.4% from 25 to 44, 33.8% from 45 to 64, and 22.6% who were 65 years of age or older. The median age was 47 years. For every 100 females, there were 96.9 males. For every 100 females age 18 and over, there were 96.7 males.

The median income for a household in the township was $40,263, and the median income for a family was $51,806. Males had a median income of $32,308 versus $26,164 for females. The per capita income for the township was $24,975. About 3.0% of families and 6.3% of the population were below the poverty line, including 7.7% of those under age 18 and 3.5% of those age 65 or over.
