= Sleeping Bear Dunes National Lakeshore =

Protected area in Michigan, United States

- IUCN category III (natural monument or feature)
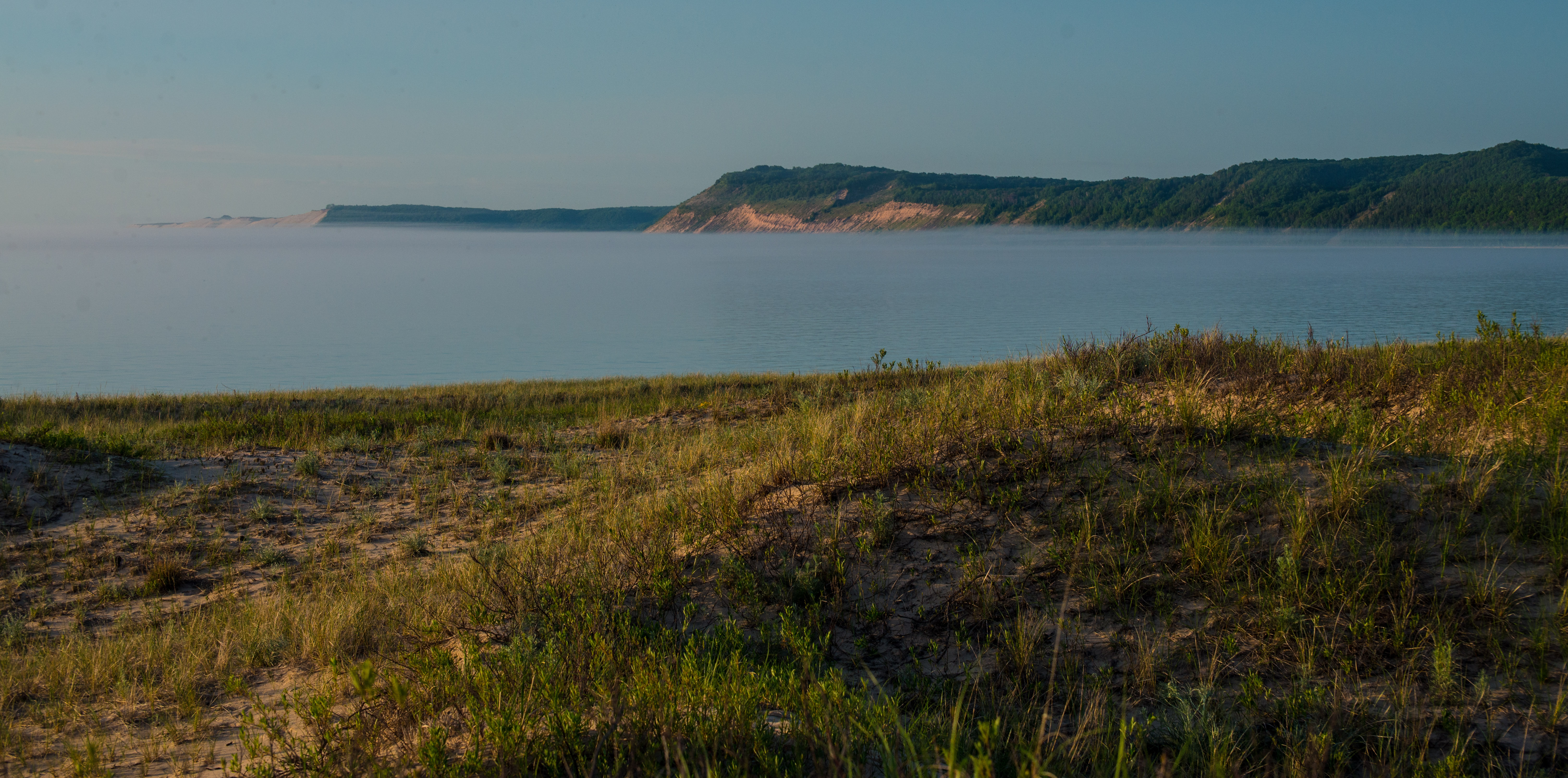
- Dunes rising above Lake Michigan from Platte Point
- Interactive map of Sleeping Bear Dunes National Lakeshore
- Location: Benzie and Leelanau counties, Michigan, United States
- Nearest city: Empire, Michigan; Glen Arbor, Michigan
- Coordinates: 44°51′N 86°03′W
- Area: 71,199 acres (288.13 km^{2})
- Established: October 21, 1970
- Visitors: 1,501,117 (in 2022)
- Governing body: National Park Service
- Website: Sleeping Bear Dunes National Lakeshore

Sleeping Bear Dunes National Lakeshore is a U.S. national lakeshore in the northwestern Lower Peninsula of Michigan. Located within Benzie and Leelanau counties, the park extends along a 35-mile (56 km) stretch of Lake Michigan's eastern coastline, as well as North and South Manitou islands, preserving a total of 71,199 acres (111 sq mi; 288 km^{2}). The park is known for its outstanding natural features, including dune formations, forests, beaches, and ancient glacial phenomena. The lakeshore also contains many cultural features, including the 1871 South Manitou Island Lighthouse, three former stations of the Coast Guard (formerly the Life-Saving Service), and an extensive rural historic farm district.

The park is administered by the National Park Service, and was established on October 21, 1970. In 2011, the area won the title of "The Most Beautiful Place in America" from Good Morning America. In 2014, a section of the park was named the Sleeping Bear Dunes Wilderness by the United States Congress.

== Geography ==
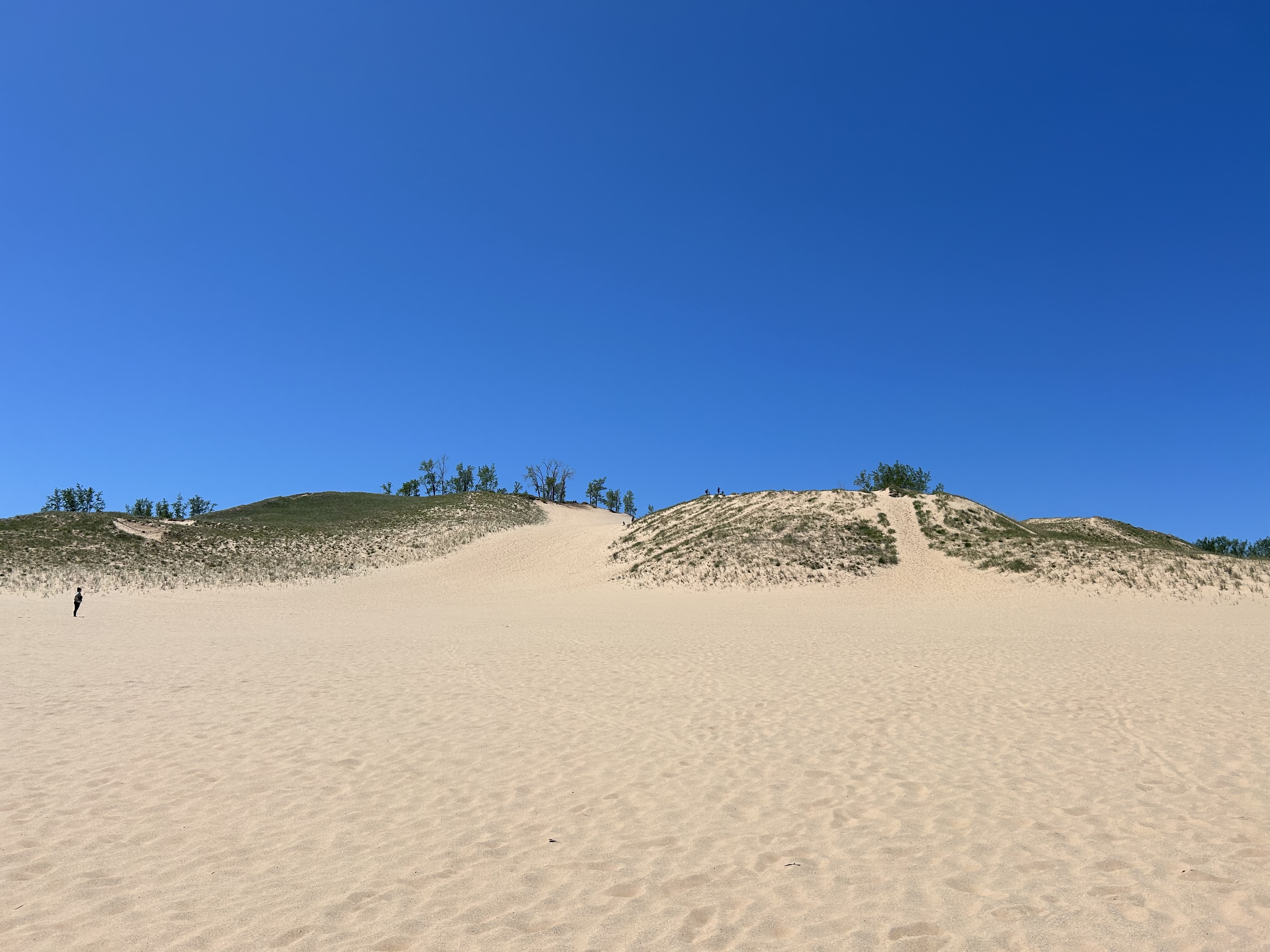
Various smaller dunes located within the park

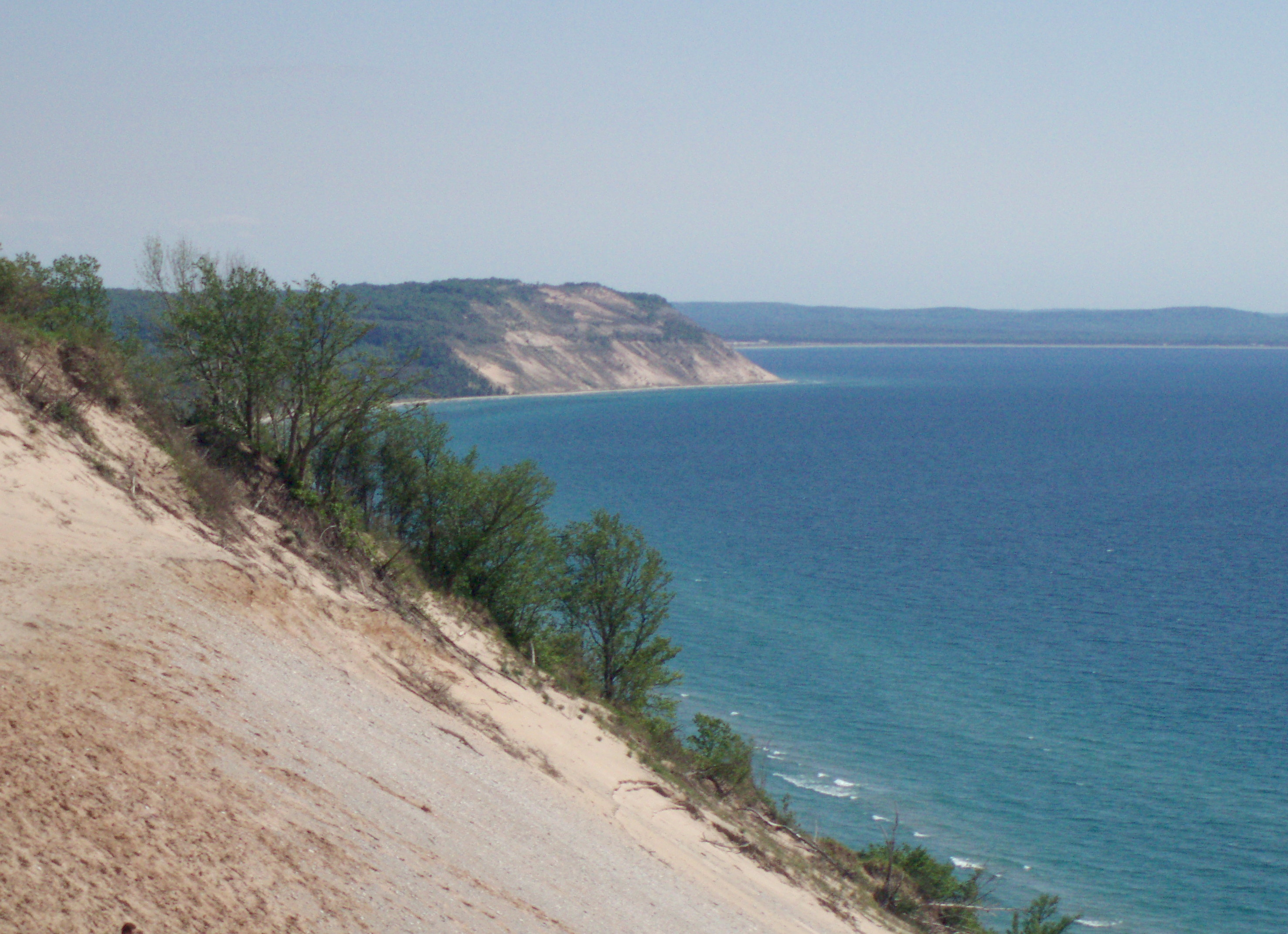
Looking south from Sleeping Bear Bluff toward Empire Bluff

The Sleeping Bear Dunes National Lakeshore protects 71,199 acres (111 sq mi; 288 km^{2}) of the shoreline of Lake Michigan. Much of this area is located on the Leelanau Peninsula, a large peninsula in the northwest of Michigan's Lower Peninsula. The park is located about 20 miles (32 km) west of Traverse City, the largest city in Northern Michigan.

The southern end of the park is located within northwestern Benzie County, and includes the shoreline of Platte Bay and the mouth of the Platte River. This area of the park is much flatter than the northern sections, within southwestern Leelanau County. The Leelanau County sections of the park include the dune climb, Empire Bluff, Pyramid Point, and Pierce Stocking Scenic Drive. Much of the park within Leelanau County is located adjacent to Glen Lake, Michigan's 18th largest lake.

Administered by the park are North Manitou Island and South Manitou Island. These islands are accessible by ferry access from Leland.

Within the park run scenic highways M-22 and M-109. The M-22 shield has become such a popular cultural symbol to visitors of the area that a company based out of Traverse City began selling merchandise with the symbol in 2004.

=== Local communities ===
The nearest communities to the national lakeshore are Empire and Glen Arbor. Empire is home to the Philip A. Hart Visitor Center, which serves as the park's headquarters.

=== Municipalities within protected area ===
The following municipalities contained land administered by the National Park Service:

Benzie County

- Benzonia Township
- Lake Township
- Platte Township

Leelanau County

- Centerville Township
- Cleveland Township
- Empire Township
- Glen Arbor Township
- Kasson Township
- Leland Township

== History ==
=== Prehistory ===
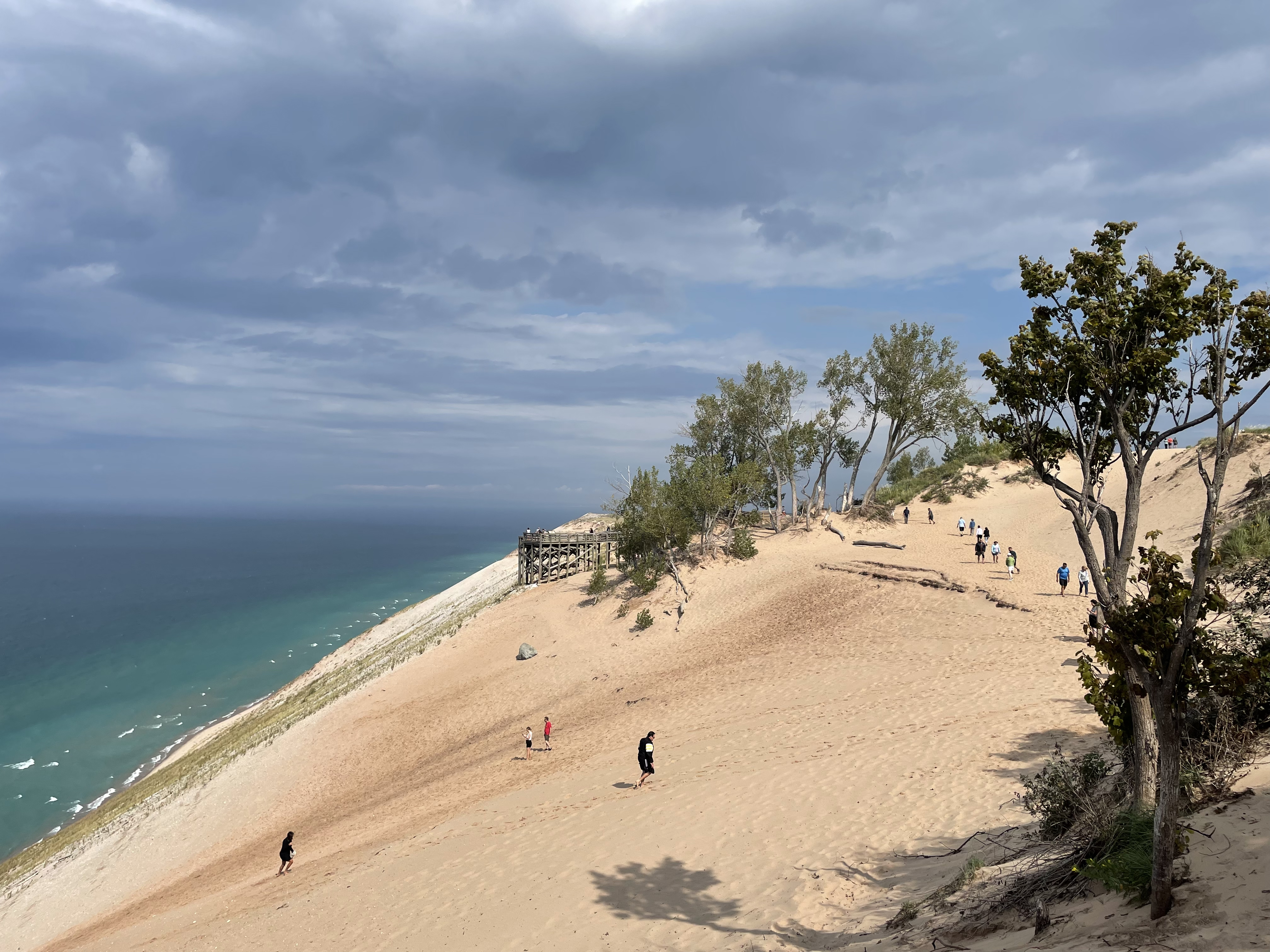
View of the dunes with people for scale, showing the sheer size of the dunes

The landscape within the park was formed during the Wisconsin glaciation during the Last Glacial Period, approximately 10,000–14,000 years ago. The dunes themselves are not a true dune, but a perched dune, a thin layer of wind-blown sand perched upon a large deposit of glacial debris. Over time, the dunes have slowly migrated eastward.

=== Recent history ===
In 1962, Senator Philip Hart first introduced a bill to create Sleeping Bear Dunes National Park. The park finally was authorized on October 21, 1970. The park's creation was controversial because it involved the transfer of private property to public ownership. The federal government's stance at the time was that the Great Lakes were the "third coast" and had to be preserved much like Cape Hatteras National Seashore or Point Reyes National Seashore. The residents living in what is now Sleeping Bear Dunes National Lakeshore believed themselves stewards of the land and did not want it to be overrun by tourists. The government eventually won out, in part by supporting the local schools to offset the lost property tax revenue and by including North Manitou Island in the national lakeshore area.

In 2014, 32,500 acres (13,200 ha; 50.8 sq mi) of the park were formally designated as the Sleeping Bear Dunes Wilderness by the Sleeping Bear Dunes National Lakeshore Conservation and Recreation Act. This was the first wilderness protection bill to be passed by the United States Congress in five years.

In 2022, a man from Frankfort illegally diverted the mouth of the Platte River, allowing the river to meet Lake Michigan at a more direct angle. Charges were filed against the man in 2023.

=== Etymology ===
The dune system is named after an Ojibwe legend of the sleeping bear. According to the legend, an enormous forest fire on the western shore of Lake Michigan drove a mother bear and her two cubs into the lake for shelter, determined to reach the opposite shore. After many miles of swimming, the two cubs lagged. When the mother bear reached the shore, she waited on the top of a high bluff. The exhausted cubs drowned in the lake, but the mother bear stayed and waited, hoping that her cubs would finally appear. Impressed by the mother bear's determination and faith, the Great Spirit created two islands (North and South Manitou islands) to commemorate the cubs, and the winds buried the sleeping bear under the sands of the dunes where she waits to this day. The "bear" was a small tree-covered knoll at the top edge of the bluff that appeared like a sleeping bear from the water. Wind and erosion have caused the "bear" to be greatly reduced in size over the years.

== Recreation ==
=== Dune climb ===
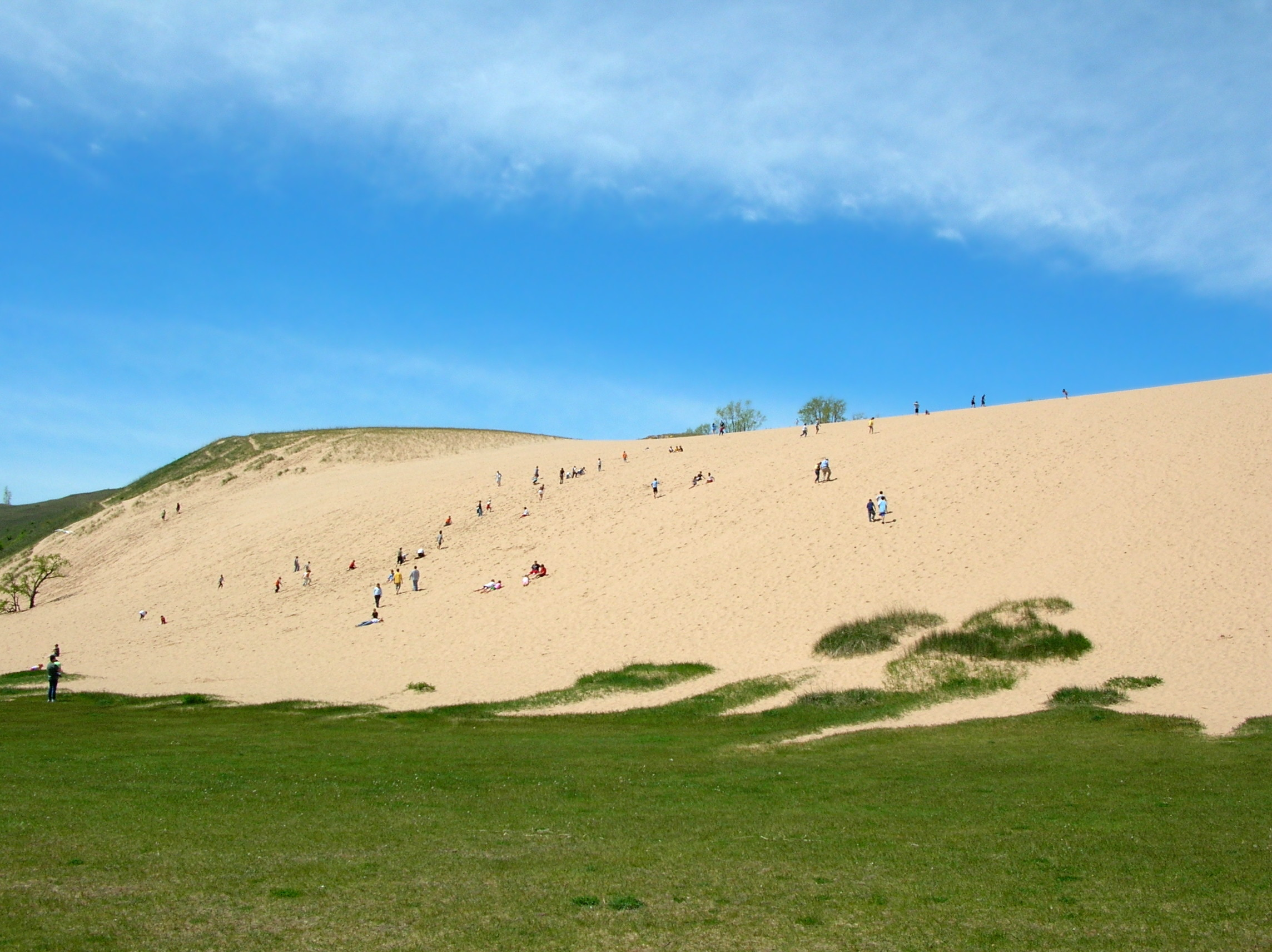
The dune climb

The main dune climb is located across from Glen Lake. Visitors who travel by car will be required to buy a day pass or annual pass from the National Park Service. The dune climb is also accessible by foot or by bike. Water stations are located along the base of the main dune, along with a restroom and gift shop. Hikers can hike all the way to Lake Michigan.

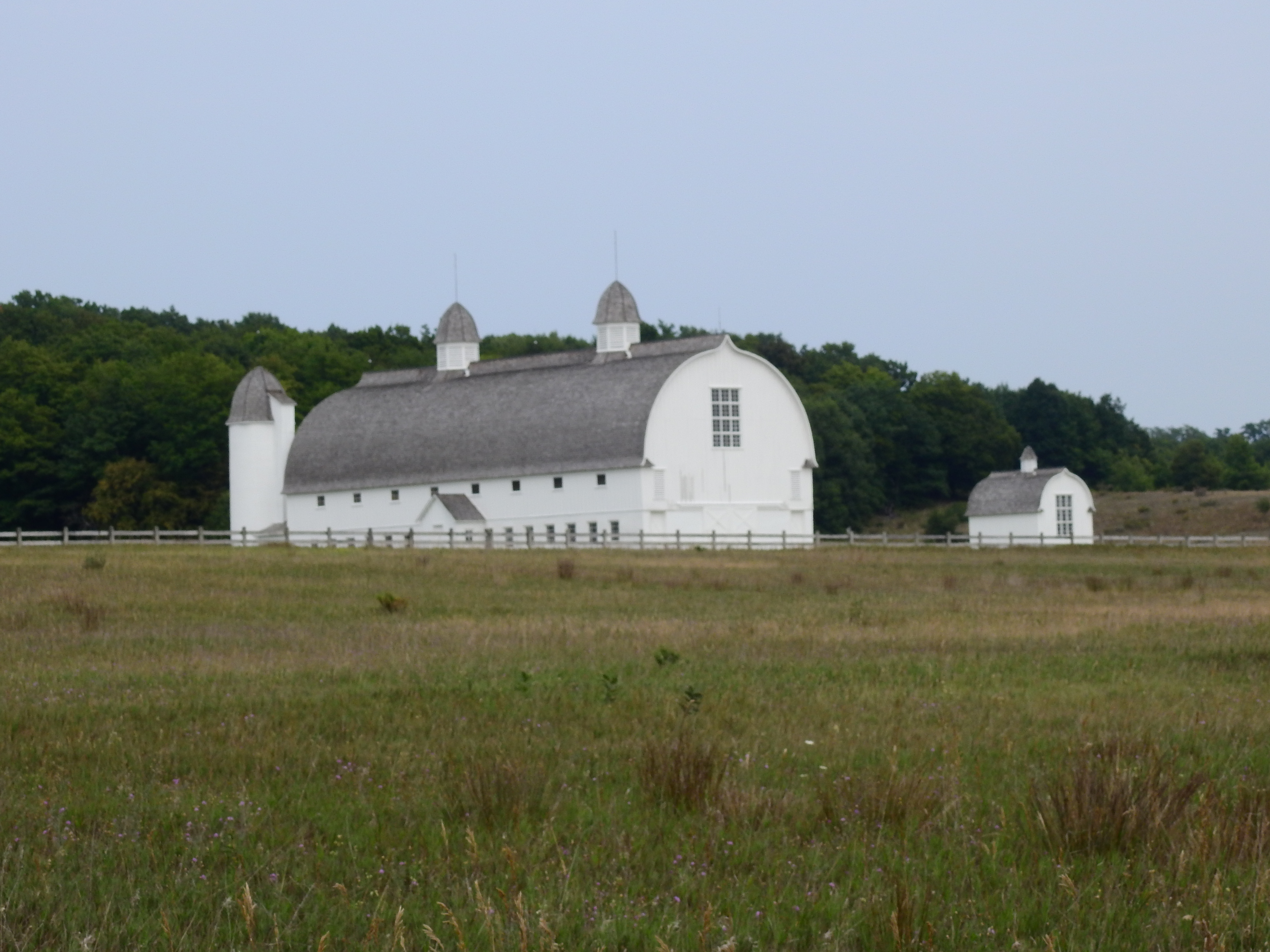
Historic D.H. Day Farm

=== Camping ===
Sleeping Bear Dunes National Lakeshore is one of Michigan's most popular destinations for camping vacations, possibly the most popular. This popularity may be due to its being named the "Most Beautiful Place in America" by Good Morning America in 2011. There are a few campgrounds in the national lakeshore and they are grouped into D.H. Day Campground, Platte River Campground, a few camping areas on the Manitou Islands within, and some other sites for backcountry or group camping. These include:

- D.H. Day Campground – located between Glen Arbor and Glen Haven, D.H. Day Campground offers a moderate level of privacy and a beach on Lake Michigan. Campsites are rustic, wooded, and more far apart than campsites at most campgrounds. Nearby points of interest include Empire Bluffs, the "dune climb", and North Bar Lake. Campsites 1–31 allow the use of a generator, the remaining sites forbid generator use.
- Platte River Campground – located in Benzie County and offers a variety of campsites. Some campsites are modern (with electrical hookups), some are "hike-in", and others are more rustic. Nearby points of interest include Platte River Point, the Platte River, and Big Platte Lake. The north section of Sleeping Bear Dunes National Park is a short drive from Platte River Campground. Kayaking is a popular activity at the campground, especially the kayak trail leading from the campground to Platte River Point

Additionally, a number of campgrounds exist on the Manitou Islands. These include three main campgrounds on South Manitou Island, including the Weather Station Campground located on the south side of the island, the Bay Campground on the west shore of the island and the Popple Campground on the north shore. Furthermore, in addition to federal campgrounds within the national lakeshore itself, there are many other camping areas nearby, which cater to the large number of tourists visiting Sleeping Bear Dunes each year. There are at least 20 distinct camping areas in the region immediately surrounding Sleeping Bear Dunes.

=== Hiking ===
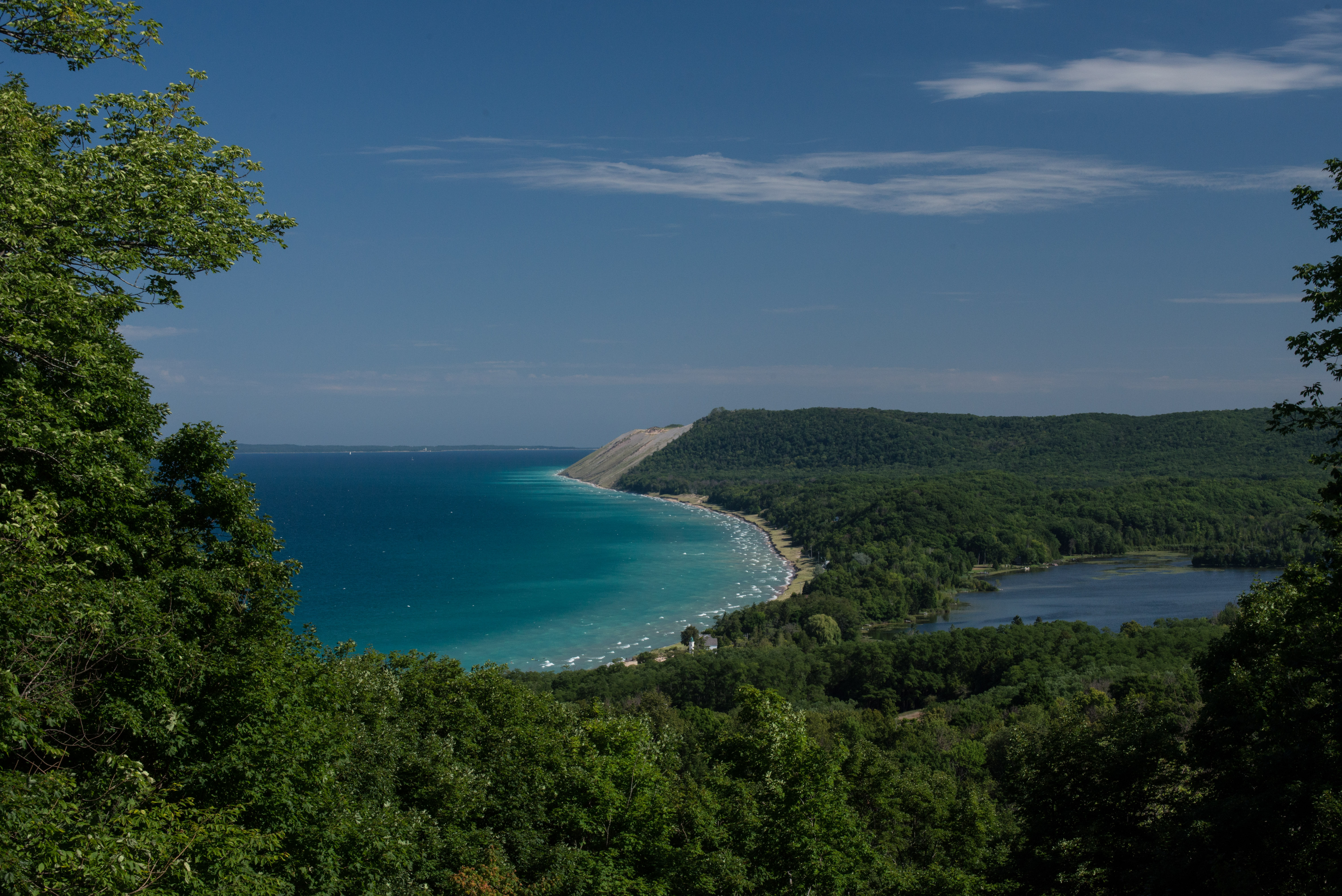
Empire Bluffs Overlook, near Empire

Sleeping Bear Dunes National Lakeshore offers a number of hiking trails. These include but are not limited to the Alligator Hill Trail, Empire Bluff Trail, Kettles Trail, Pyramid Point Trail, and Treat Farm Trail. Empire Bluff Trail is one of the most popular hiking destinations in the park. Hikers will need to get a parking pass from the visitor center in Empire to park in the lot at the trailheads.

=== Historic sites ===
==== Glen Haven Village ====
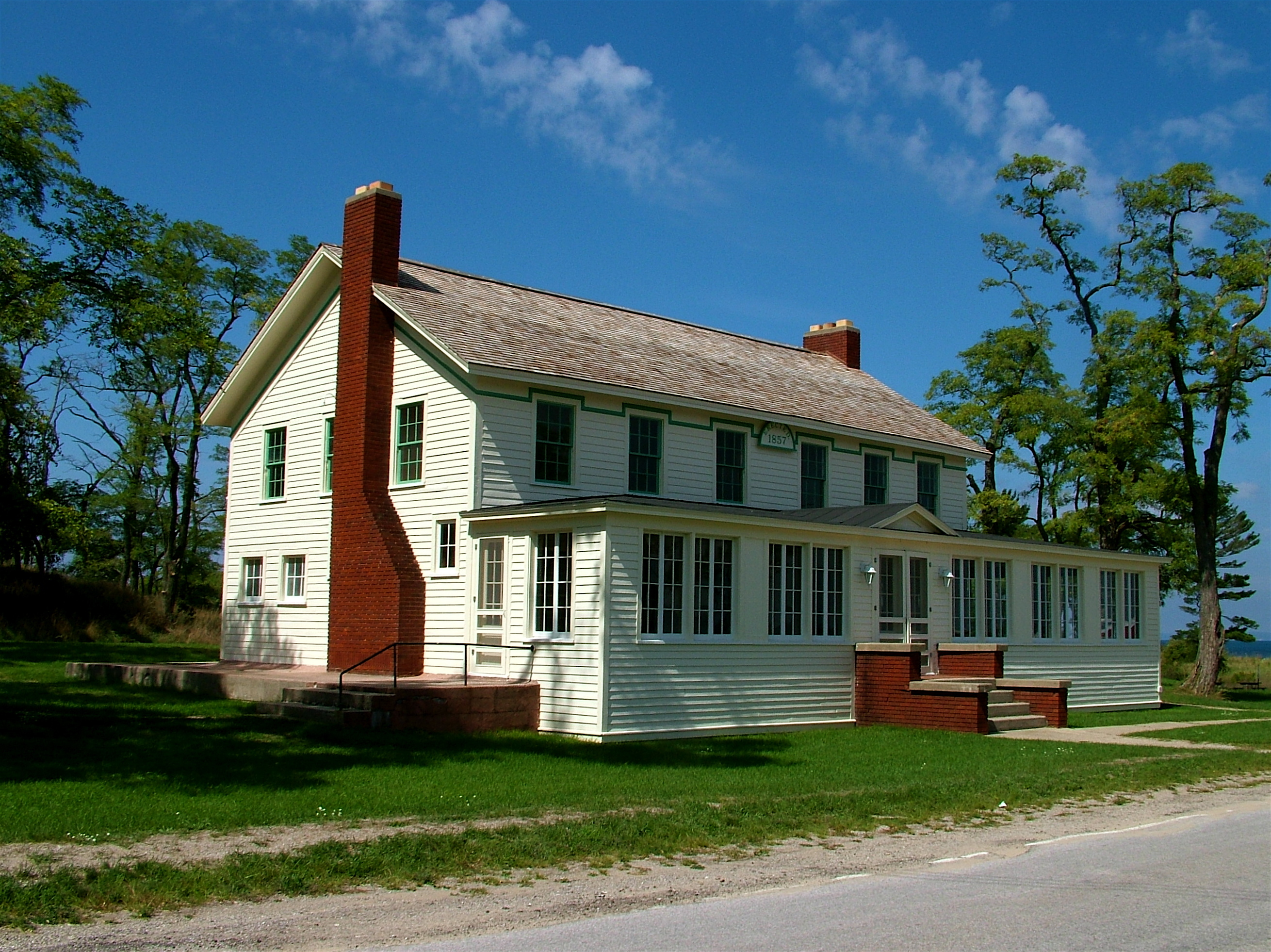
Sleeping Bear Inn in Glen Haven

Glen Haven existed as a company town from 1865 to 1931. Originally a dock for Glen Arbor (1855-date), the site soon became a fuel supply point for ships traveling up and down the lake. Here, Charles McCarty decided to open his own business and built a dock to supply the ships with wood. In 1863, McCarty built the Sleeping Bear House. It was expanded a few years later to accommodate travelers. In 1928, it was remodeled into the inn for summer vacationers. The General Store was established to supply the workers. Like most company towns, the workers were paid in company coupons, redeemable only at the company store. The Blacksmith Shop is where tools were repaired. In 1878, David Henry Day arrived in the community. By this time, coal from the Appalachian coal fields was replacing wood on the steamships, and Day was looking for another future in this small community.

==== Port Oneida Historic Farm District ====
In 1860, Port Oneida had a population of 87 people. Thomas Kelderhouse had built a dock to sell wood to the passing steamships. He was also able to sell fresh produce and maple sugar in season. A local story says that the name comes from the first ship to stop, the SS Oneida of New York state. The area covers 3,000 acres (12 km^{2}) and includes 16 historic farms. The farming community was gradually abandoned due to hard farming conditions and declining timber sales.

=== Pierce Stocking Scenic Drive ===
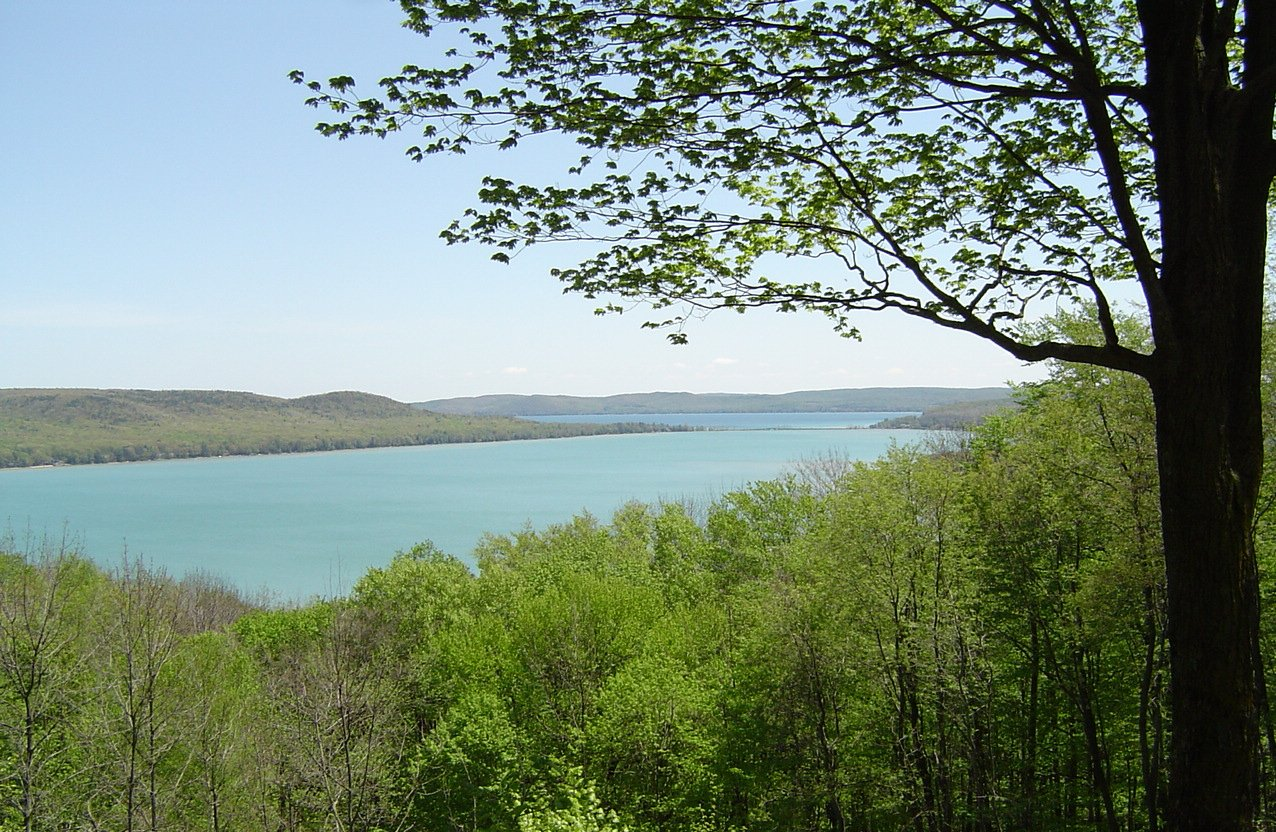
Glen Lake from the Pierce Stocking Scenic Drive

Pierce Stocking Scenic Drive is a scenic road within the park, known for its "scenic vistas and gentle curves". Located off of M-109 between Empire and Glen Haven, the road runs 7.4 miles (11.9 km), providing access to scenic views of Lake Michigan, Glen Lake, and surrounding parkland.

=== Kayaking ===
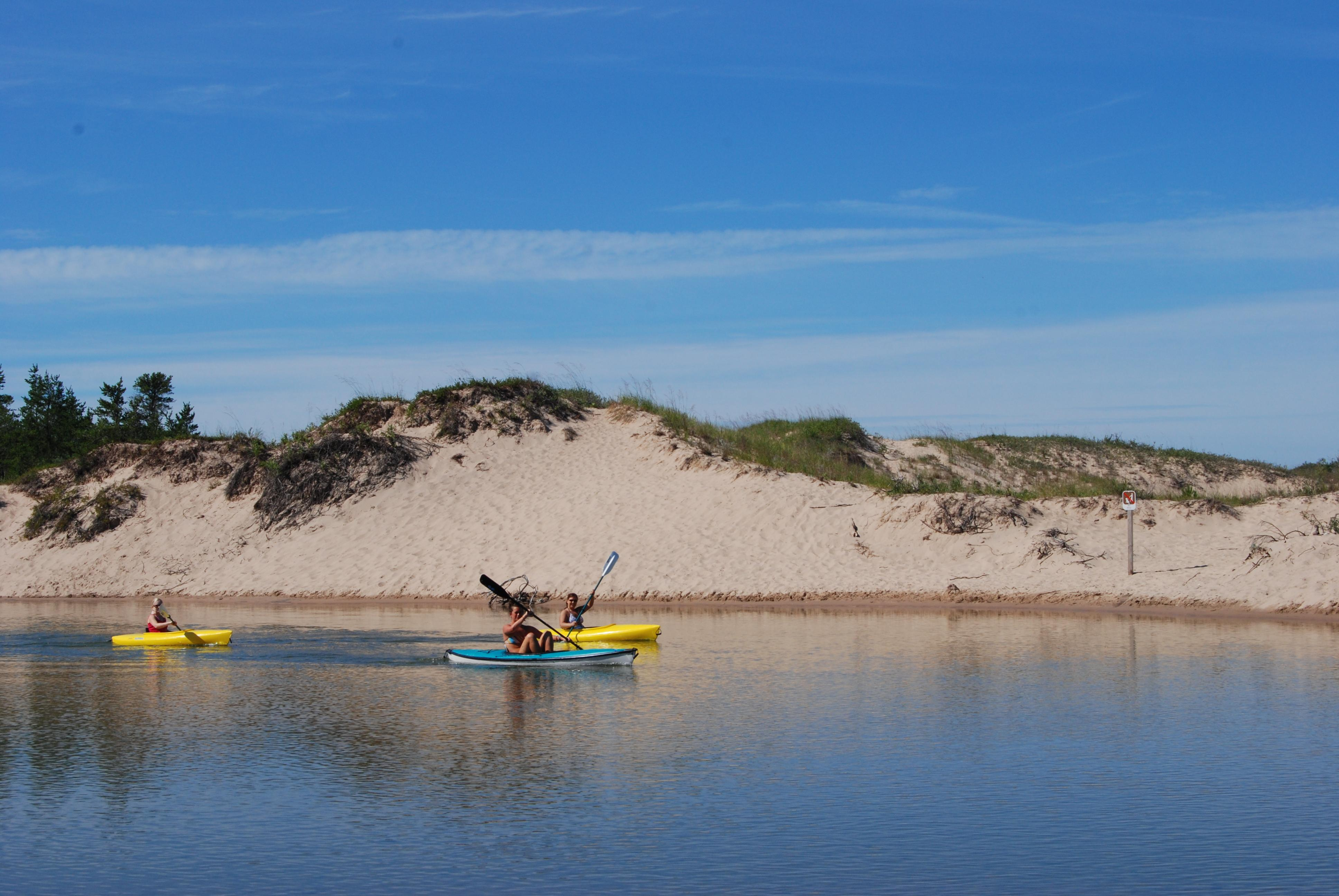
Kayakers in the Platte River, near its mouth at Platte River Point in Benzie County

Kayaking is a popular activity in the park's rivers and lakes, especially in the Crystal River and Platte River.

== Climate ==
Climate data for Traverse City, Michigan
Month	Jan	Feb	Mar	Apr	May	Jun	Jul	Aug	Sep	Oct	Nov	Dec	Year
Mean daily maximum °F (°C)	29 (−2)	29 (−2)	37 (3)	54 (12)	64 (18)	75 (24)	81 (27)	78 (26)	71 (22)	60 (16)	44 (7)	33 (1)	55 (13)
Mean daily minimum °F (°C)	15 (−9)	11 (−12)	21 (−6)	32 (0)	41 (5)	52 (11)	59 (15)	58 (14)	51 (11)	41 (5)	31 (−1)	21 (−6)	36 (2)
Average rainfall inches (mm)	1.9 (48)	1.5 (38)	1.8 (46)	2.3 (58)	2.8 (71)	2.5 (64)	2.8 (71)	2.7 (69)	3 (76)	2.8 (71)	2.7 (69)	1.8 (46)	28.6 (730)
Average snowfall inches (cm)	19.9 (51)	16.2 (41)	12.1 (31)	3 (7.6)	0.3 (0.76)	0.0 (0.0)	0.0 (0.0)	0.0 (0.0)	0.0 (0.0)	0.7 (1.8)	8.8 (22)	16.5 (42)	77.5 (197)

== Endangered species ==
The piping plover, a federally registered endangered species, nests at Sleeping Bear Dunes National Lakeshore.

== Gallery ==
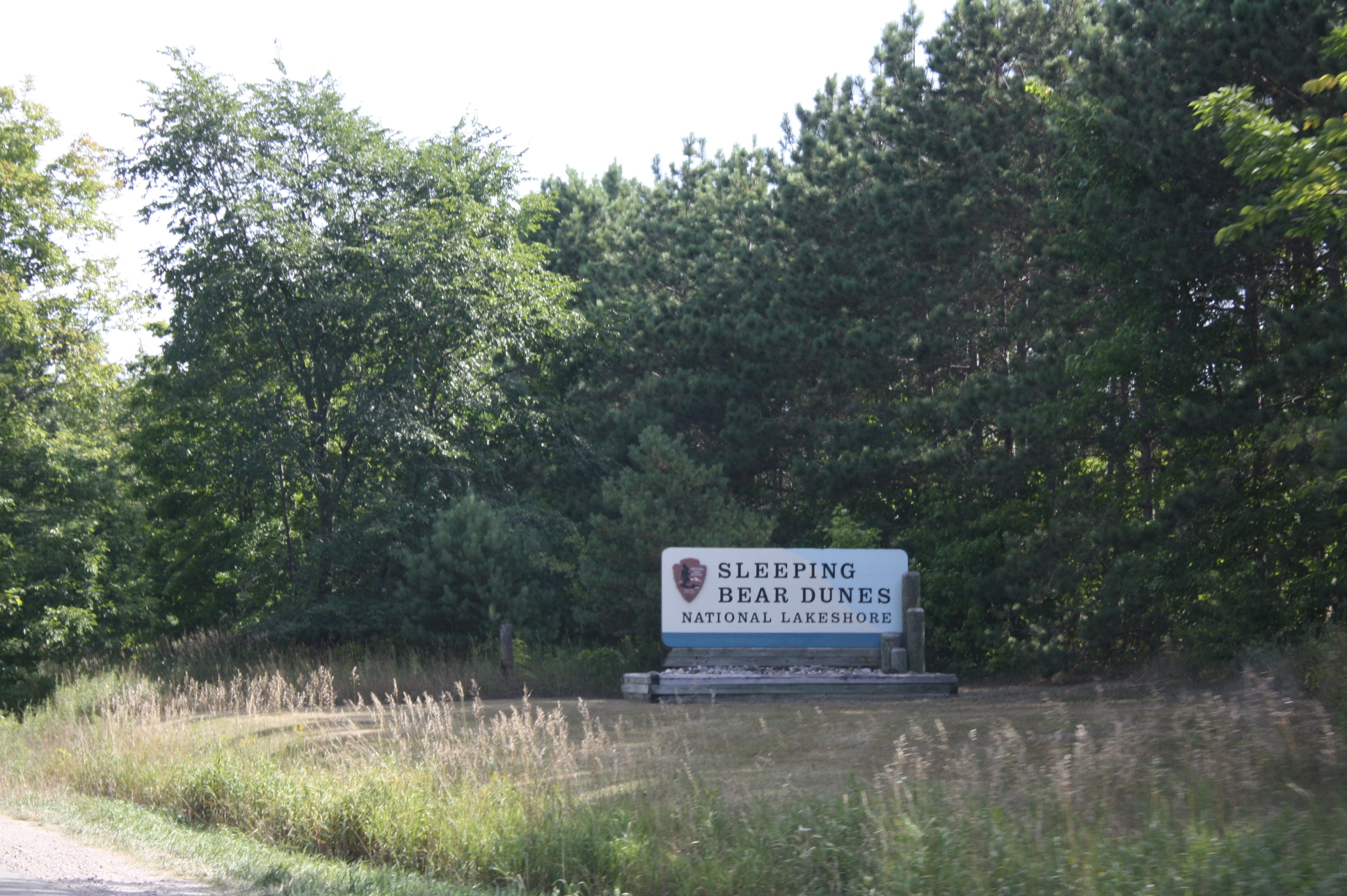
Sign along M-22

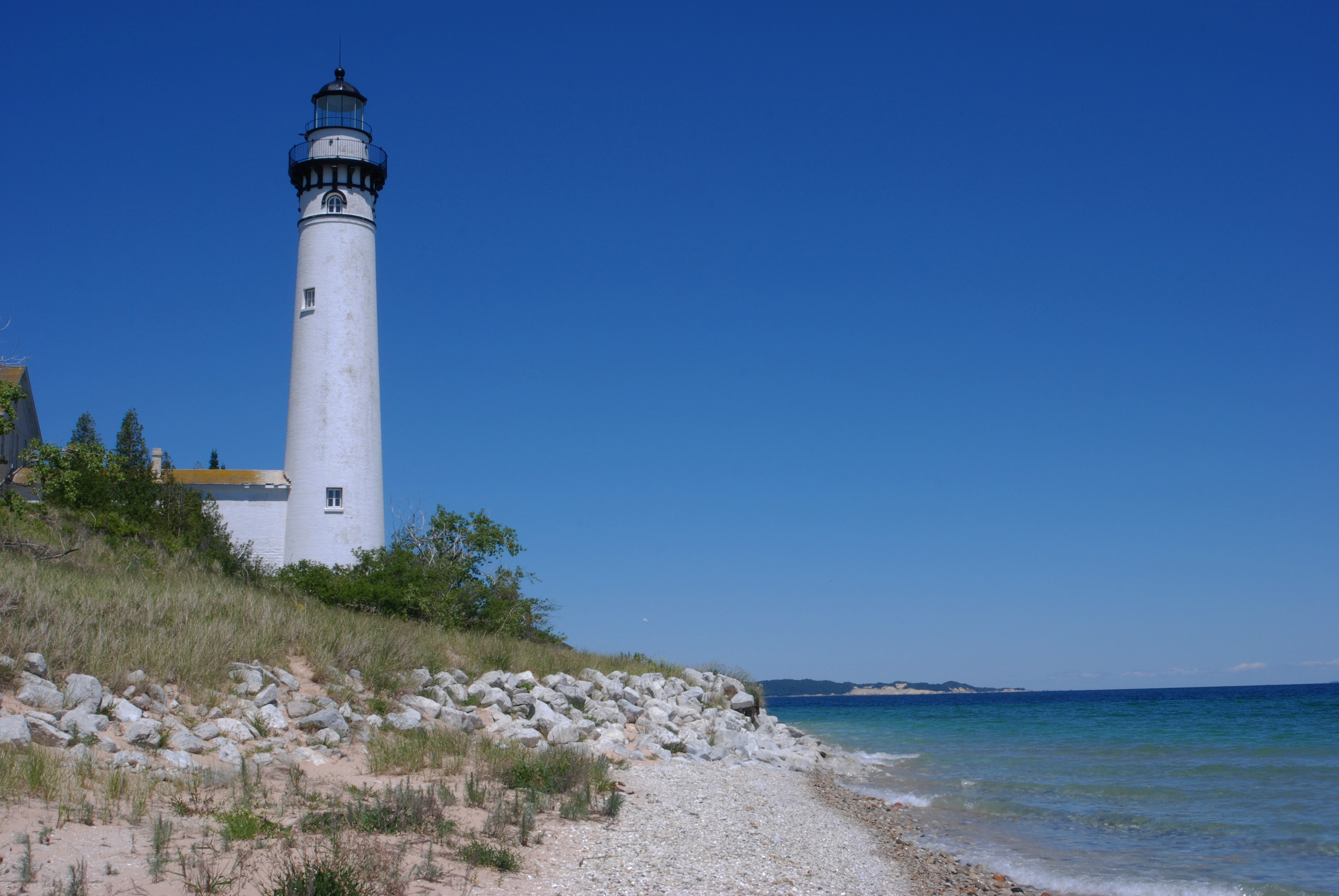
South Manitou Island Lighthouse

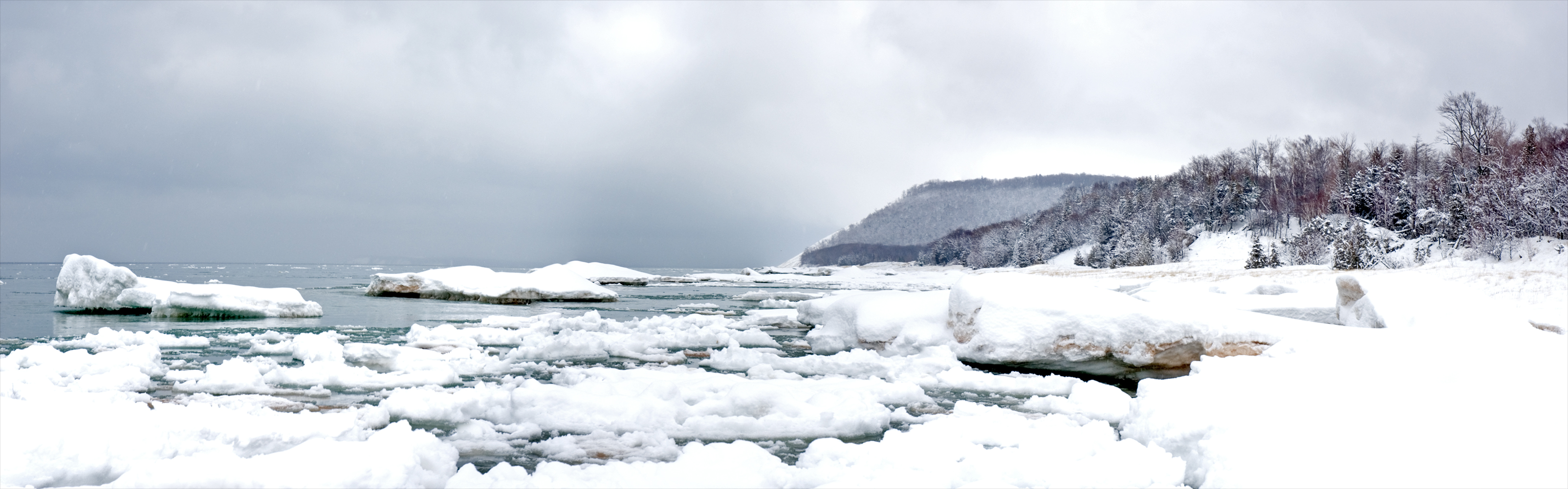
The lakeshore during winter

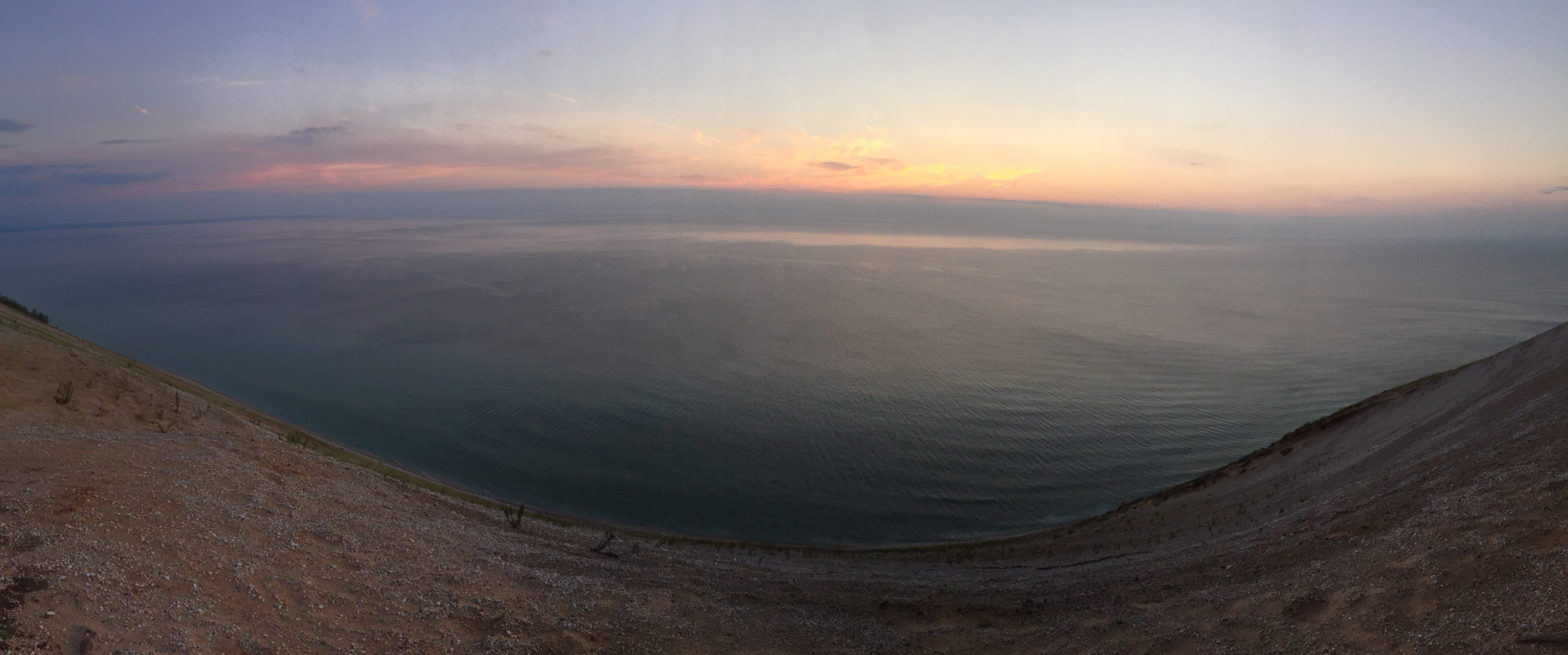
View from Pierce Stocking Scenic Drive at Sunset

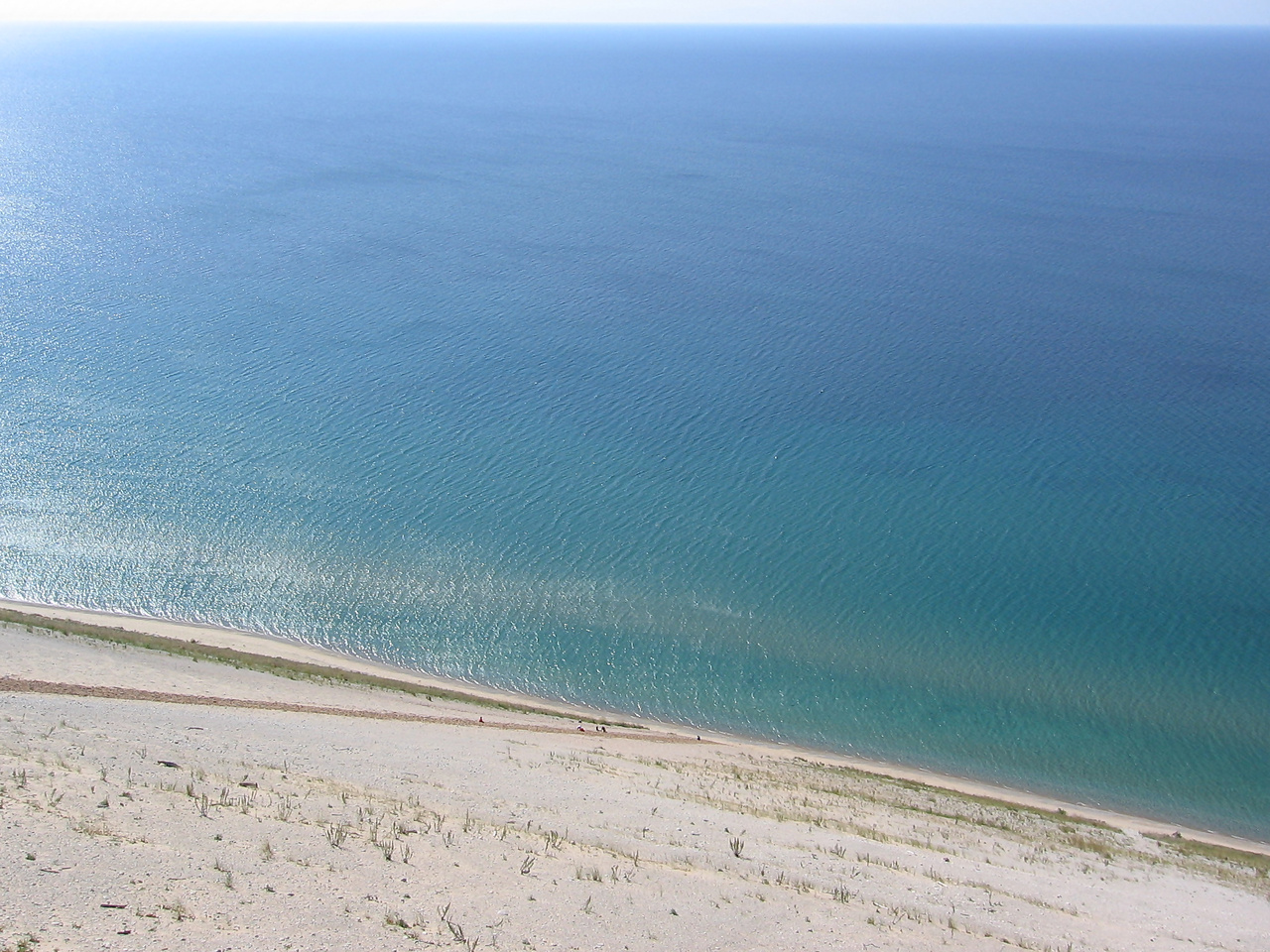
View from Lake Michigan Overlook, with people climbing up the dunes

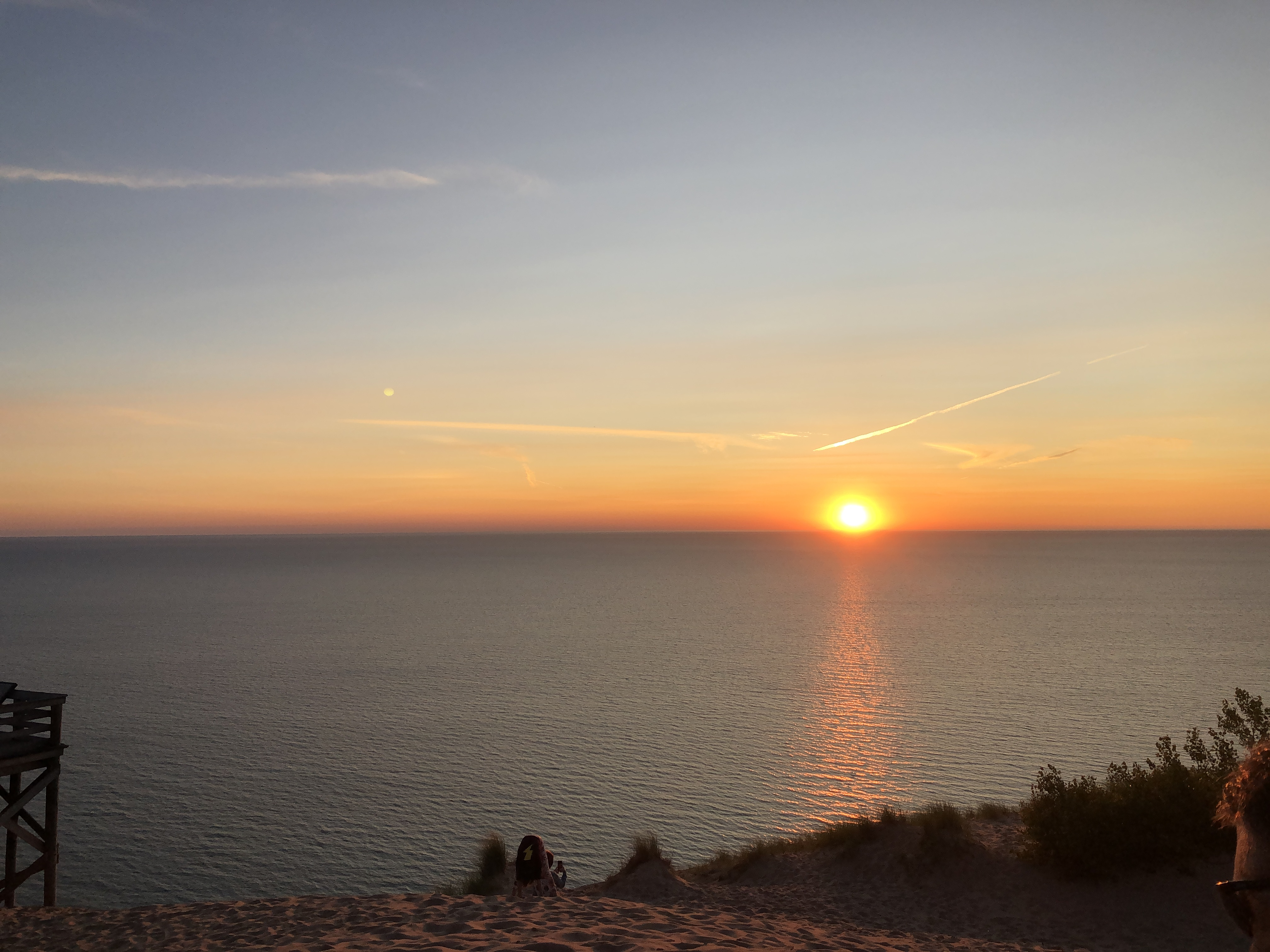
Sunset over Lake Michigan

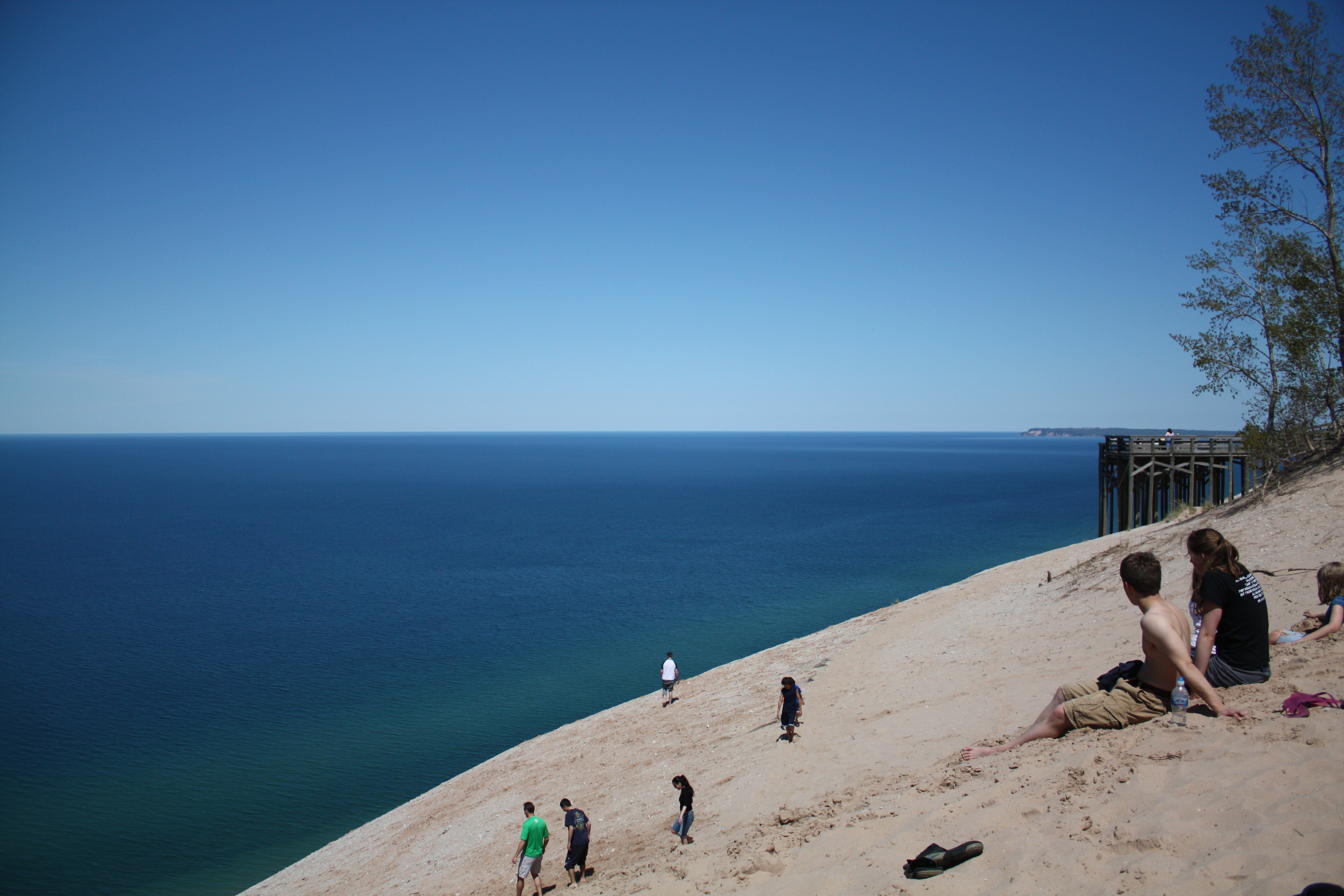
Dune Overlook

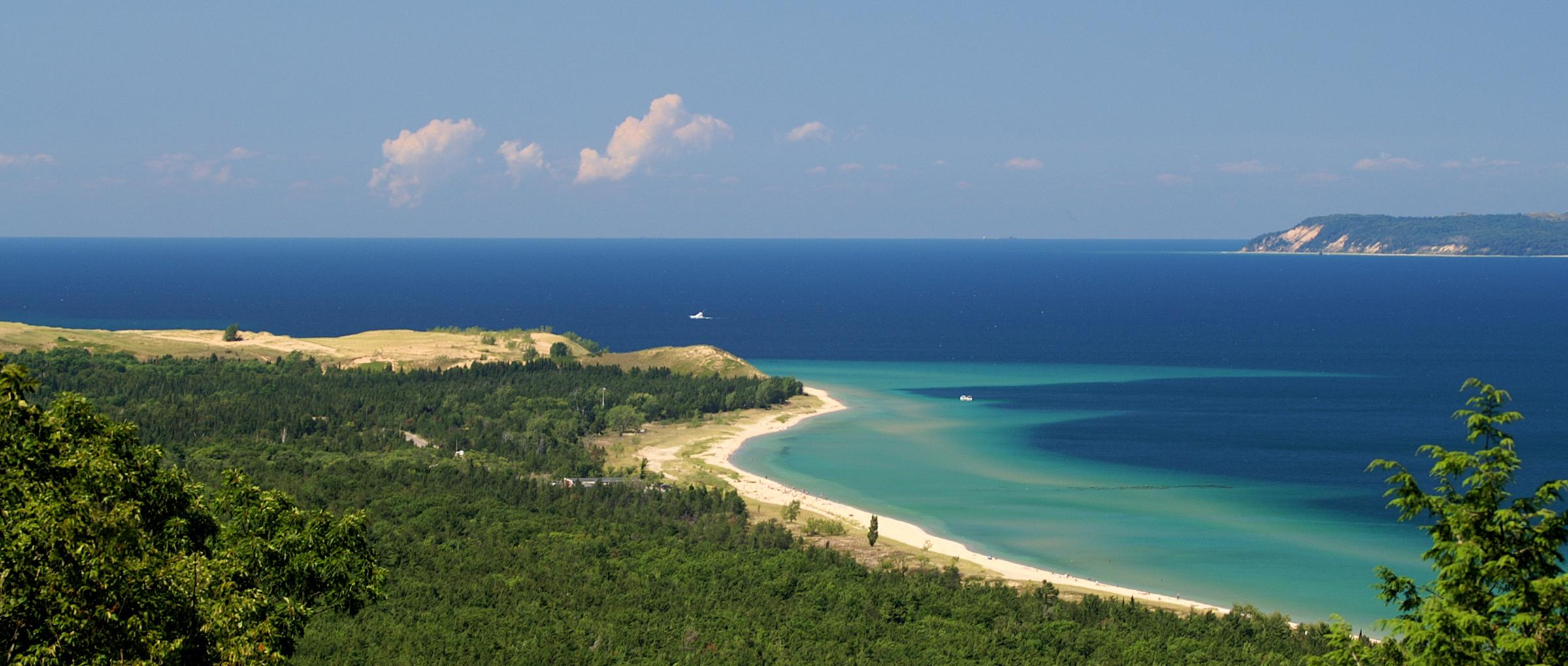
Sleeping Bear Point and South Manitou Island (background) from Alligator Hill

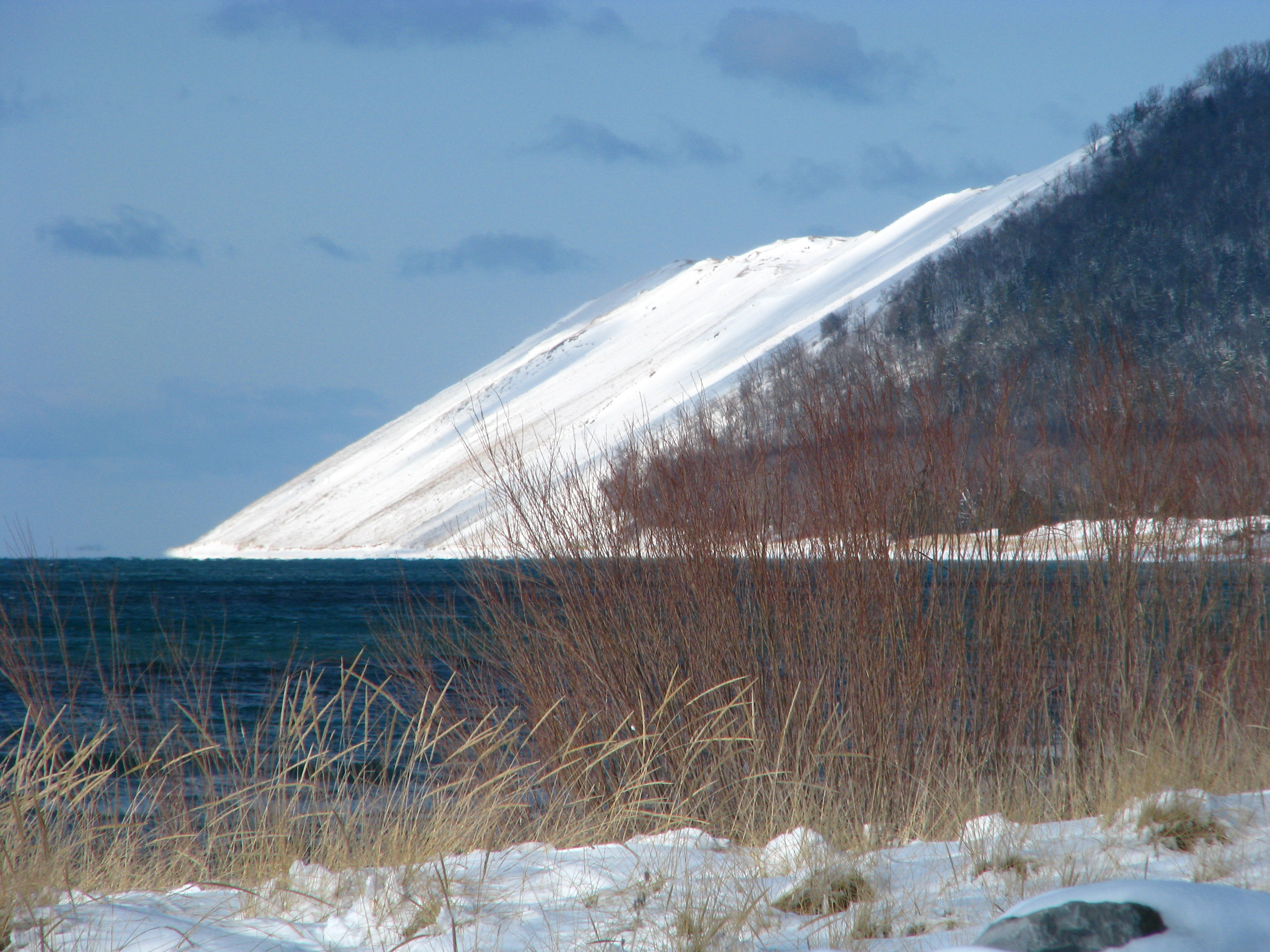
Sleeping Bear Bluff in Winter

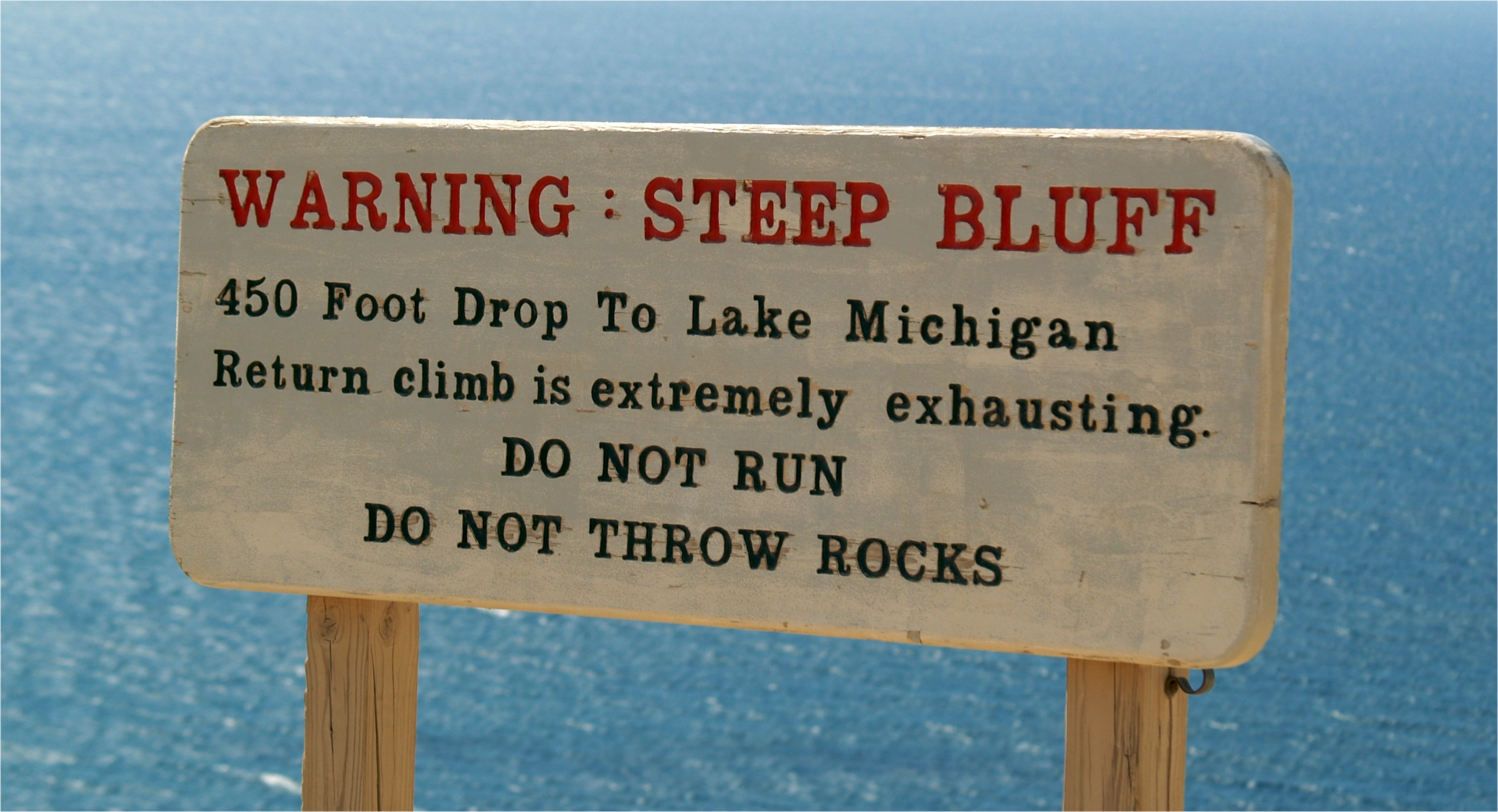
Warning sign atop a steep bluff

== See also ==
- Sand dune
- Pierce Stocking Scenic Drive
- List of areas in the National Park System of the United States
