= Crystal River (Michigan) =

River in Michigan, USA

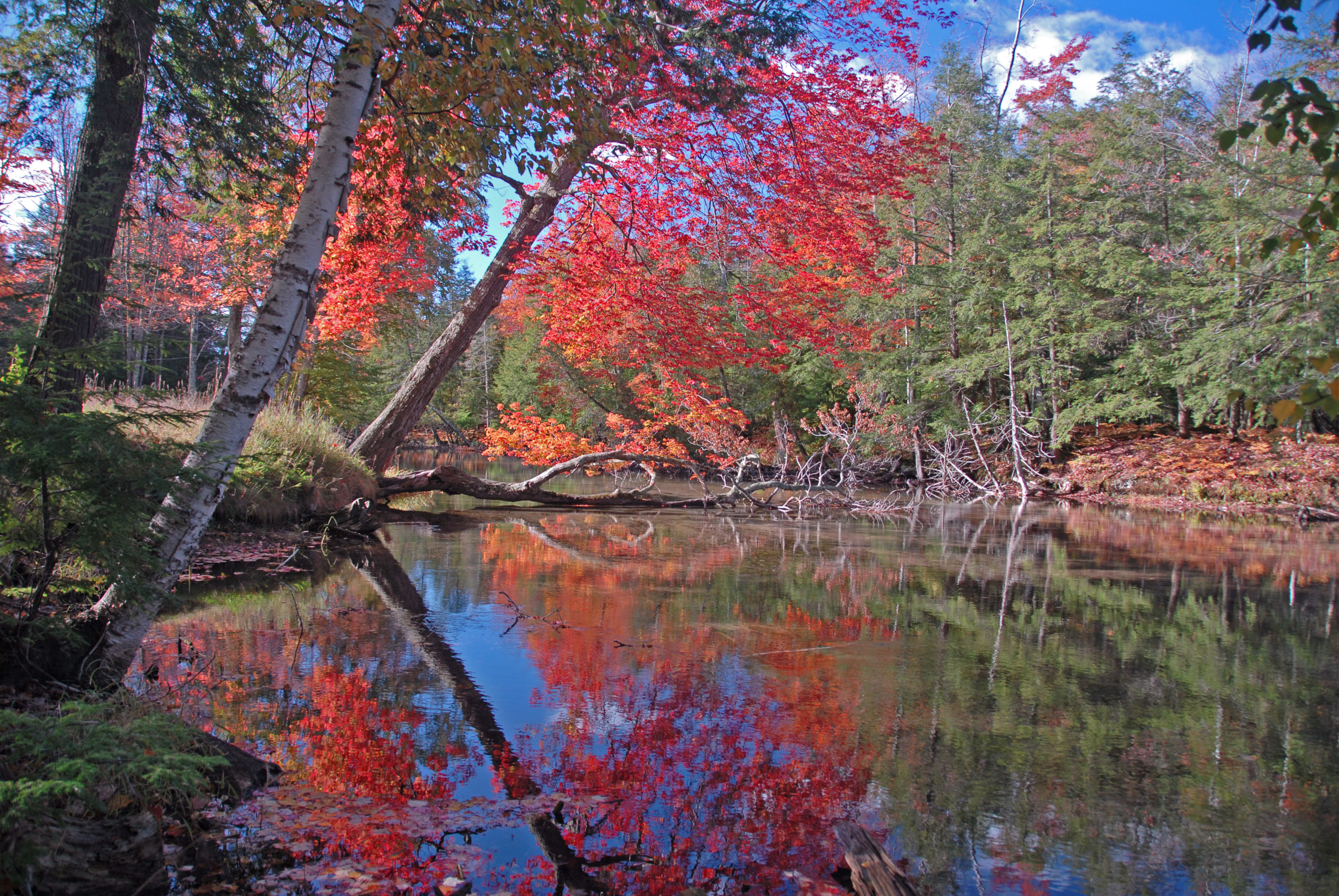
- The Crystal River near Glen Arbor

Physical characteristics
- Source
  - location: Glen Lake near Glen Arbor
  - coordinates: 44.89166°N 85.94472°W
- Mouth
  - location: Lake Michigan near Glen Arbor
  - coordinates: 44.9186°N 85.97092°W
- Length: 6.3 mi (10.1 km)

The Crystal River is a 6.3-mile-long (10.1 km) stream located in the southwest section of Leelanau County in northern Michigan's Lower Peninsula, flowing from Glen Lake through sections of the Sleeping Bear Dunes National Lakeshore into Lake Michigan just north of the small town of Glen Arbor. Although the straight-line distance between Glen Lake and Lake Michigan is only 1.2 miles (1.9 km), the river meanders through swamp lands for more than 5 times that distance.

The river is popular with kayakers, rafters and canoe enthusiasts, with two outfitters located in the village of Glen Arbor. For the most part, the depth of the river is no more than 1 foot (0.30 m), and the width averages 15 to 20 feet (4.6 to 6.1 m) with a sandy bottom, making it ideal for families, beginning canoeists and kayakers. There are a few portages where the river flows through drainage pipes under the County Road. There is one flood control dam on the river, just past its source on Glen Lake.

The Crystal is also popular with fly fishermen and has a large population of brook and rainbow trout. The river is also a run for lake trout and salmon species coming from Lake Michigan into Glen Lake.

Numerous cottages are located along the lower reaches of the river from Glen Arbor to its mouth emptying into Lake Michigan. Groves of cedar, tamarack and paper birch, as well as the swamp lands bordering the banks, make the river an ideal habitat for turtles, frogs, beavers, muskrats and otters. Bald eagles, heron, ducks, swans and many other species of birds may be sighted along the river. There is a concerted effort by state and local authorities to improve and restore the Crystal River Watershed to conditions that will sustain native plant and animal species.
