= Glen Arbor, Michigan =

- Census-designated place (CDP) & unincorporated community
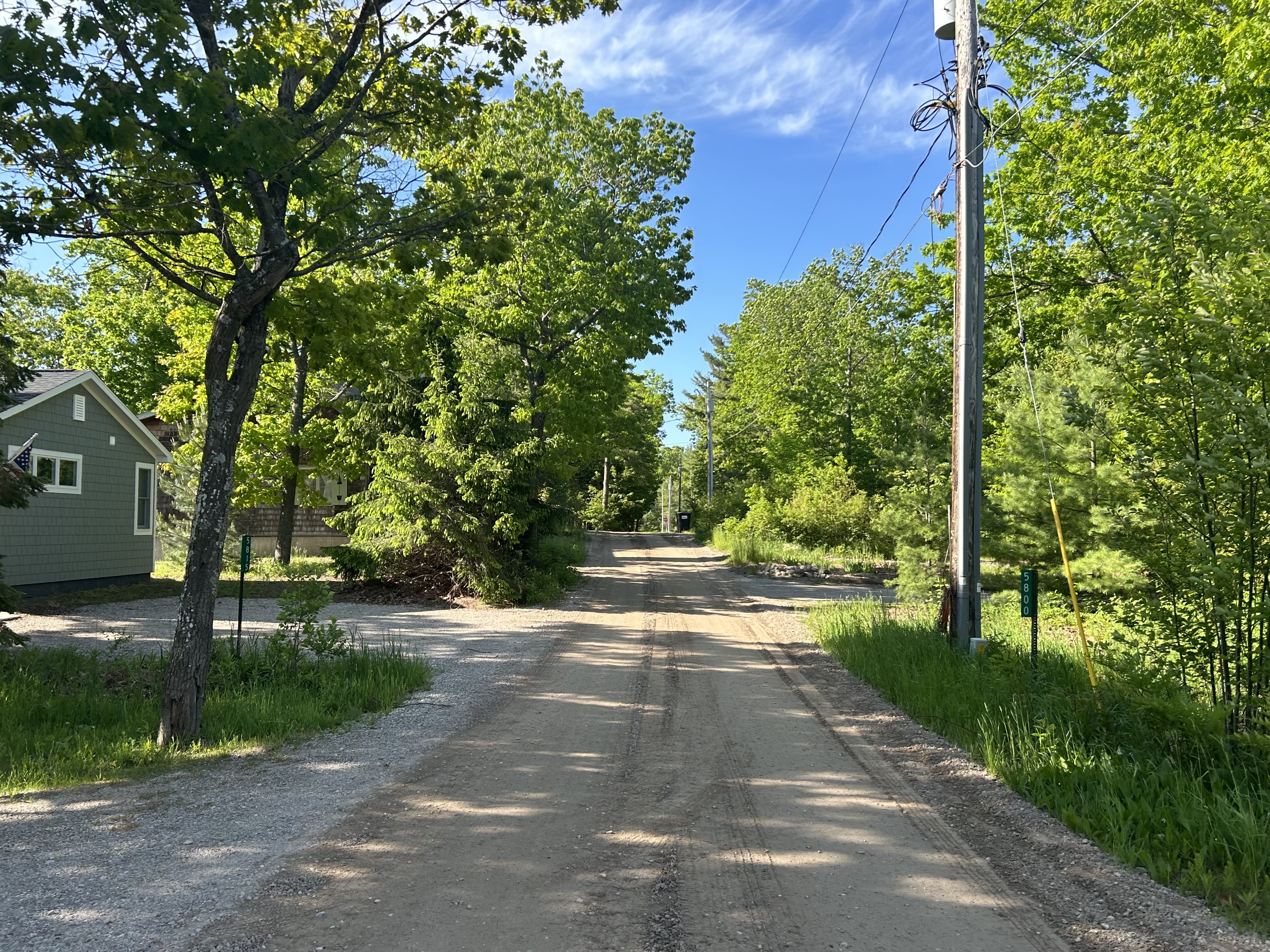
- South Lake Isle Boulevard, located off of Glen Arbor’s main road

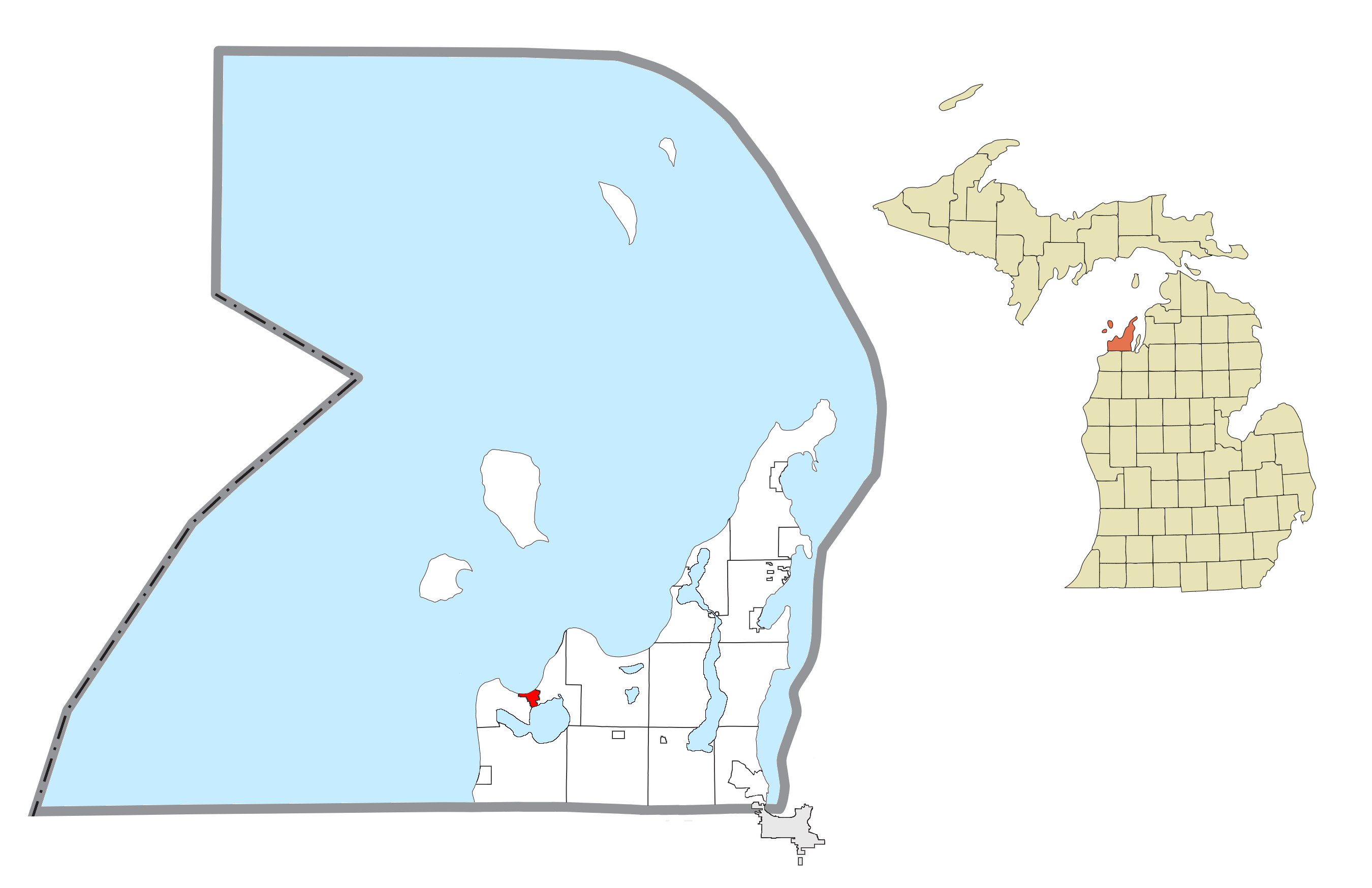
- Location within Leelanau County

- Location within the state of Michigan Location within the United States
- Coordinates: 44°53′51″N 85°59′07″W
- Country: United States
- State: Michigan
- County: Leelanau
- Township: Glen Arbor

Area
  - Total: 1.05 sq mi (2.71 km^{2})
  - Land: 1.03 sq mi (2.66 km^{2})
  - Water: 0.015 sq mi (0.04 km^{2})
- Elevation: 591 ft (180 m)

Population (2020)
  - Total: 261
  - Density: 253.7/sq mi (97.95/km^{2})
- Time zone: UTC-5 (Eastern (EST))
  - Summer (DST): UTC-4 (EDT)
- ZIP code(s): 49636
- Area code: 231
- GNIS feature ID: 626870

Glen Arbor is an unincorporated community and census-designated place in Glen Arbor Township, Leelanau County, Michigan, United States. A small tourist town, Glen Arbor lies on an isthmus between Lake Michigan and Glen Lake. It is adjacent to Sleeping Bear Dunes National Lakeshore.

Its population was 261 as of the 2020 census, up from 229 at the 2010 census. The community is located along M-22 and the Lake Michigan shore. Glen Arbor has a post office with ZIP code 49636.

== History ==
The land around Glen Arbor was first inhabited by Odawa, Ojibwe, and Potawatomi peoples, all members of the Council of Three Fires.

By 1886, lumberman D.H. Day bought vast swathes of land north of Glen Lake. He had built a sawmill on the nearby Crystal River, and developed the nearby town of Glen Haven, which led to the growth of Glen Arbor. By the 1900s, the area was recognized as a tourist mecca. In 1971, much of Day's former land was converted to Sleeping Bear Dunes National Lakeshore.

=== Etymology ===
Glen Arbor's name was coined by the wife of one of the area's early settlers. It is a combination of Glen Lake and grapevines that adorned trees in the area.

== Geography ==
According to the U.S. Census Bureau, the community has an area of 1.044 square miles (2.70 km^{2}), of which 1.028 square miles (2.66 km^{2}) is land and 0.016 square miles (0.041 km^{2}) is water.

Glen Arbor is bordered to the south by the shores of Glen Lake, to the west by the Sleeping Bear Dunes National Lakeshore, and to the north by Lake Michigan. Meandering to the east of the town, the Crystal River intersects many roads and hiking trails before terminating in Lake Michigan.

=== Major highways ===
- M-22, a famous highway which runs along the picturesque Lake Michigan coast, runs through the heart of Glen Arbor to the south and east.
- M-109, which connects M-22 with part of Sleeping Bear Dunes National Lakeshore, enters the town from the west, and ends at a junction with M-22 in downtown Glen Arbor.

== Demographics ==
Historical population
Census	Pop.	Note	%±
2010	229		—
2020	261		14.0%
U.S. Decennial Census

As of the census of 2010, there were 229 people living in the township. The population density was 27.6 inhabitants per square mile (10.7/km^{2}). There were 1,617 housing units at an average density of 56.6 units per square mile (21.9 units/km^{2}). The racial makeup of the township was 98.69% White, 0.44% African American, 0.44% Asian, and 0.44% from two or more races. Hispanic or Latino residents of any race were 1.31% of the population.

The gender gap of the town was almost split evenly, with females accounting for 53.71% and males for 46.29% of the population.

In the township, 11.79% of residents were under the age of 18, 45.85% were from 18 to 64, and 42.36% were 65 years of age or older. The median age was 53 years. For every 100 females, there were 96.0 males. For every 100 females age 18 and over, there were 97.0 males.

The median income for a household in the township was $46,719, and the median income for a family was $58,571. Males had a median income of $35,114 versus $30,179 for females. The per capita income for the township was $29,070. About 1.5% of families and 5.1% of the population were below the poverty line, including 6.0% of those under age 18 and 2.0% of those age 65 or over.

== Gallery ==
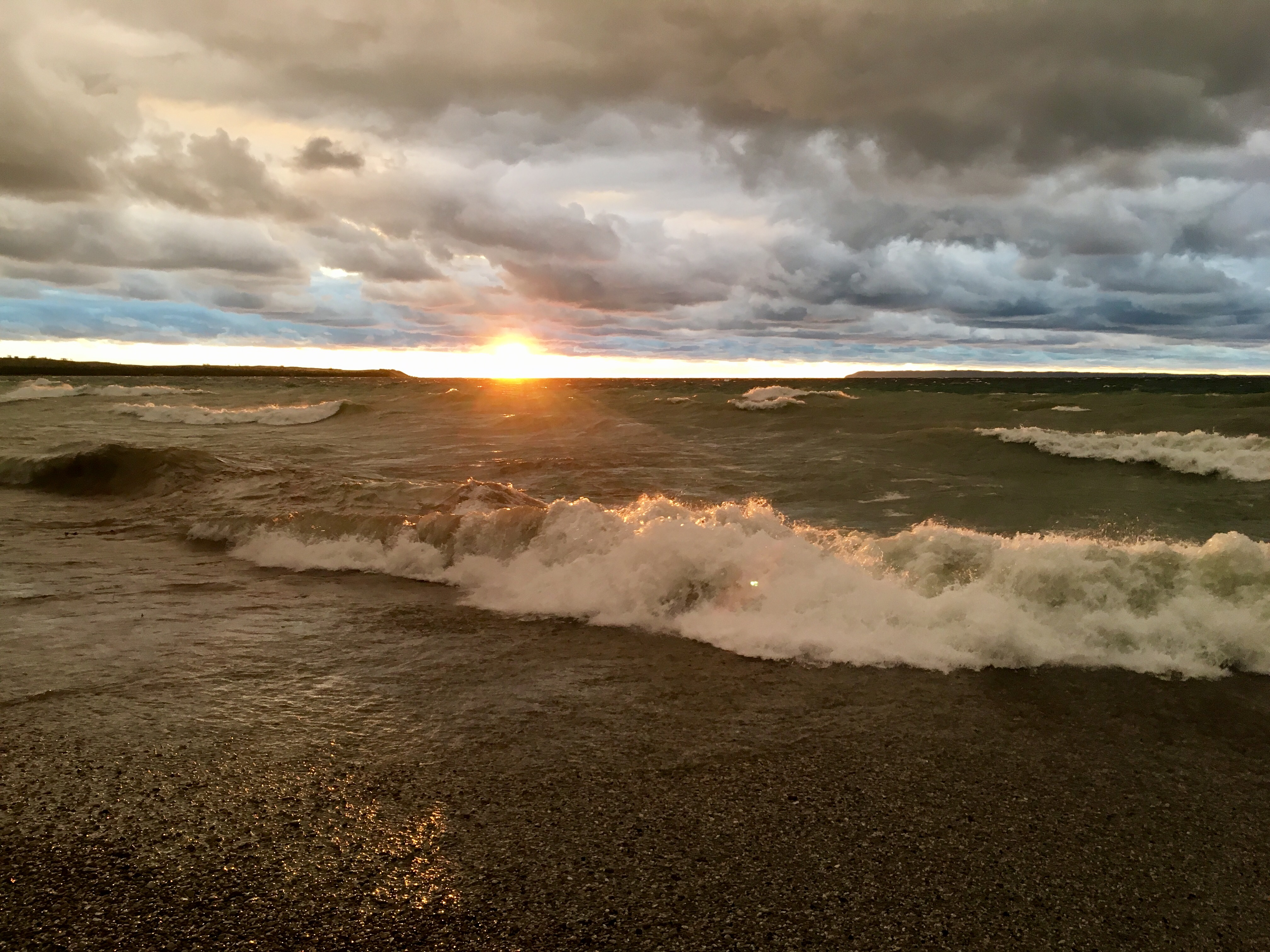
Sleeping Bear Bay

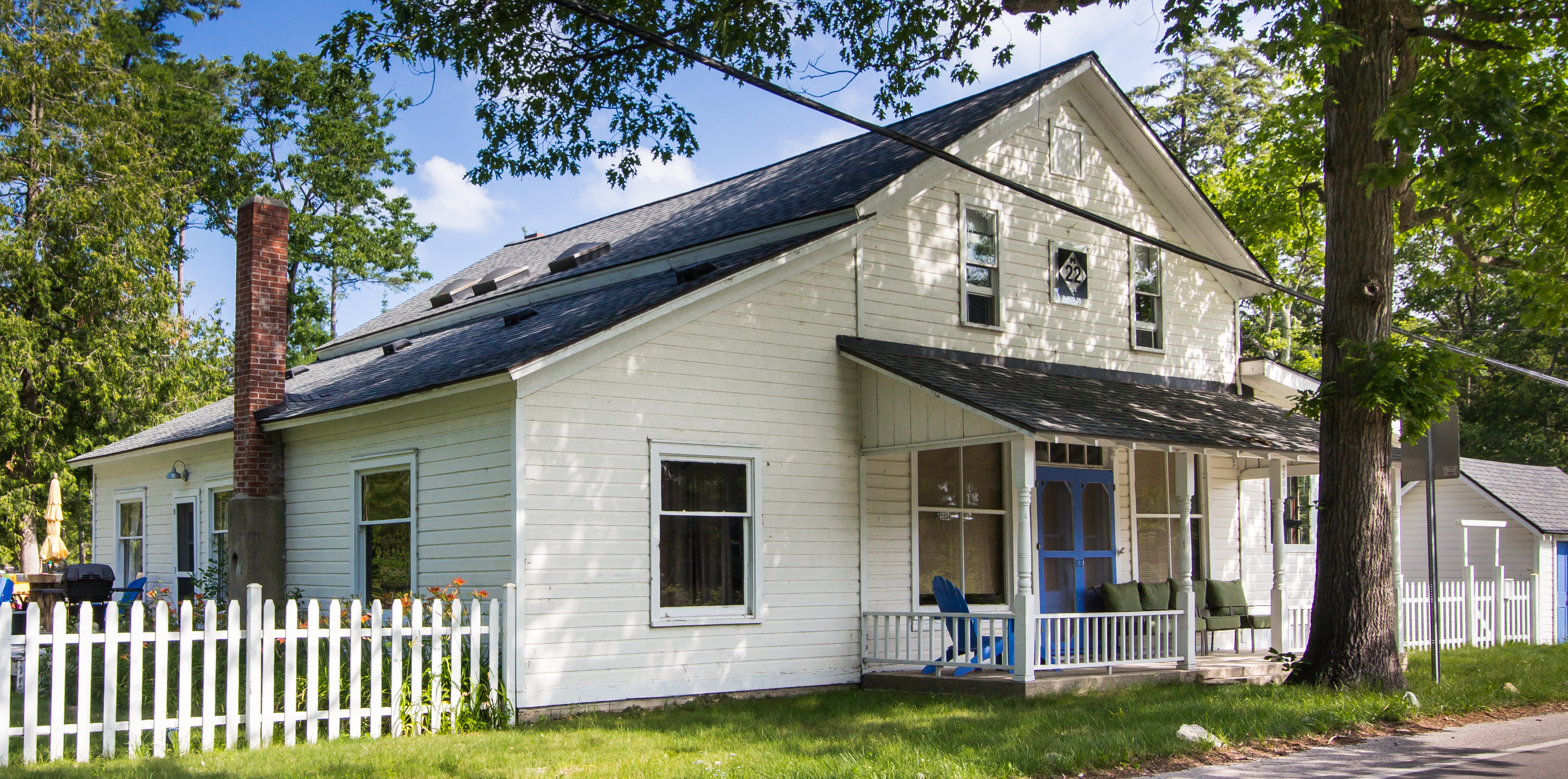
Frank E. Fisher store

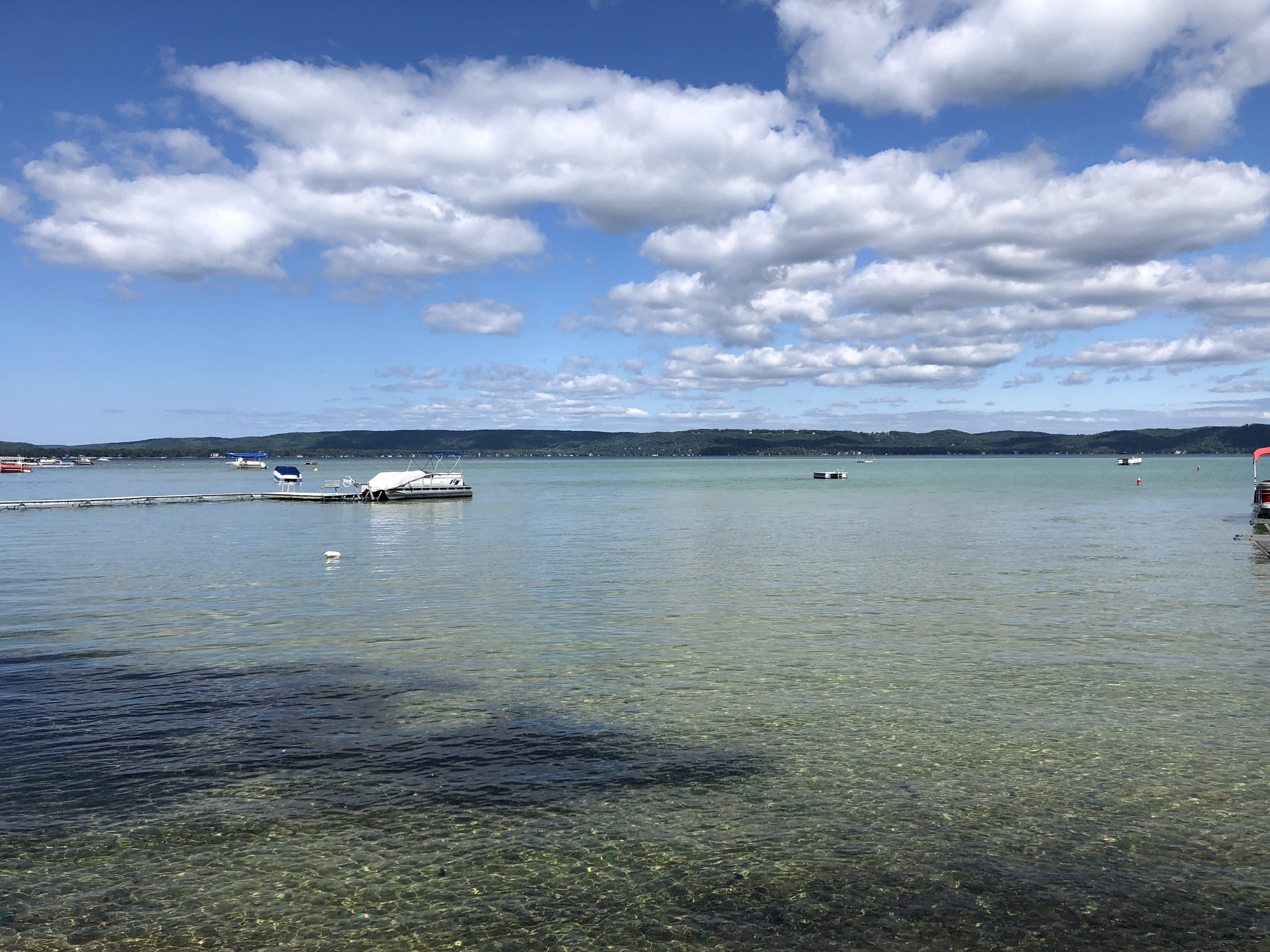
Big Glen Lake

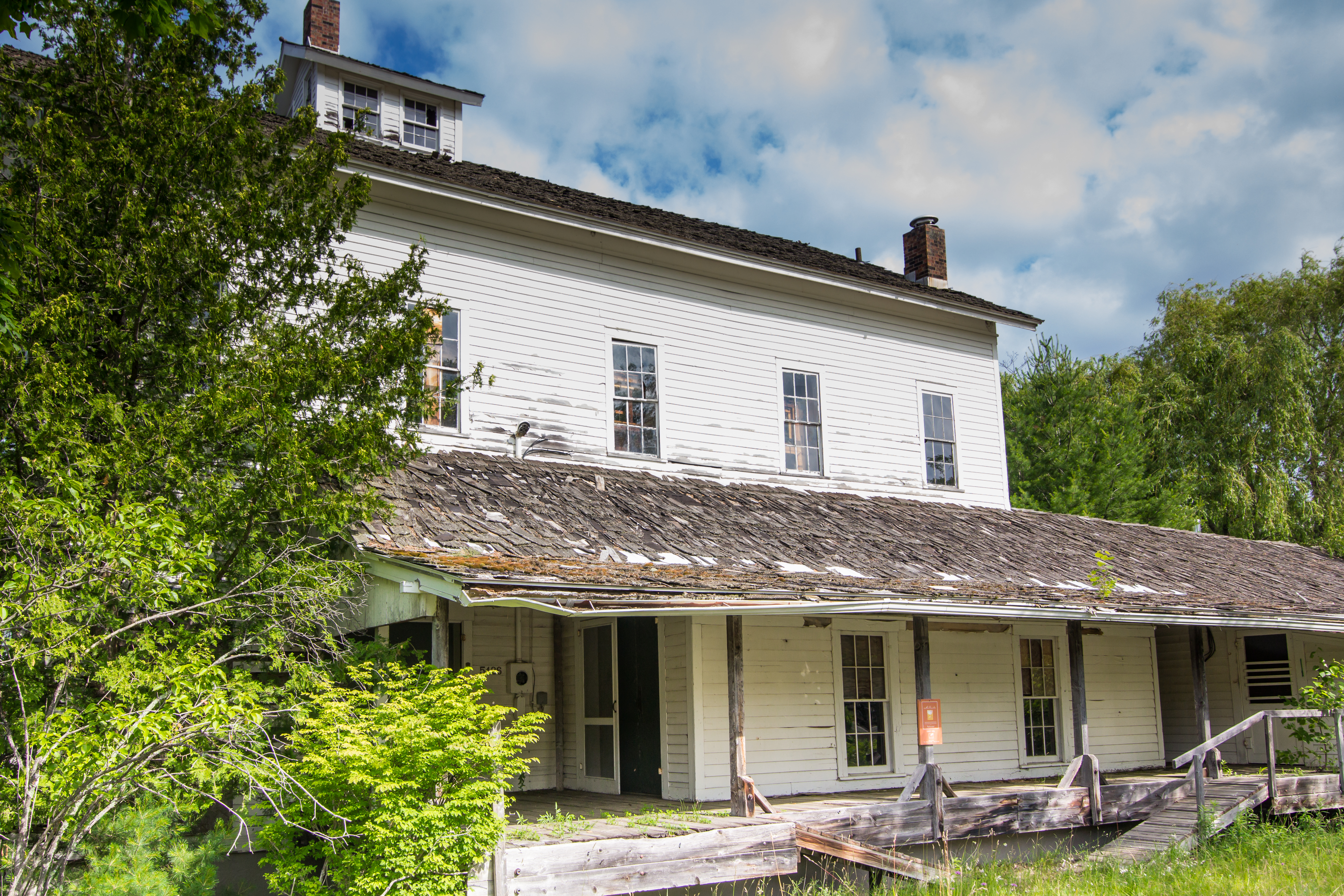
The Glen Arbor Roller Mills, once a recording studio

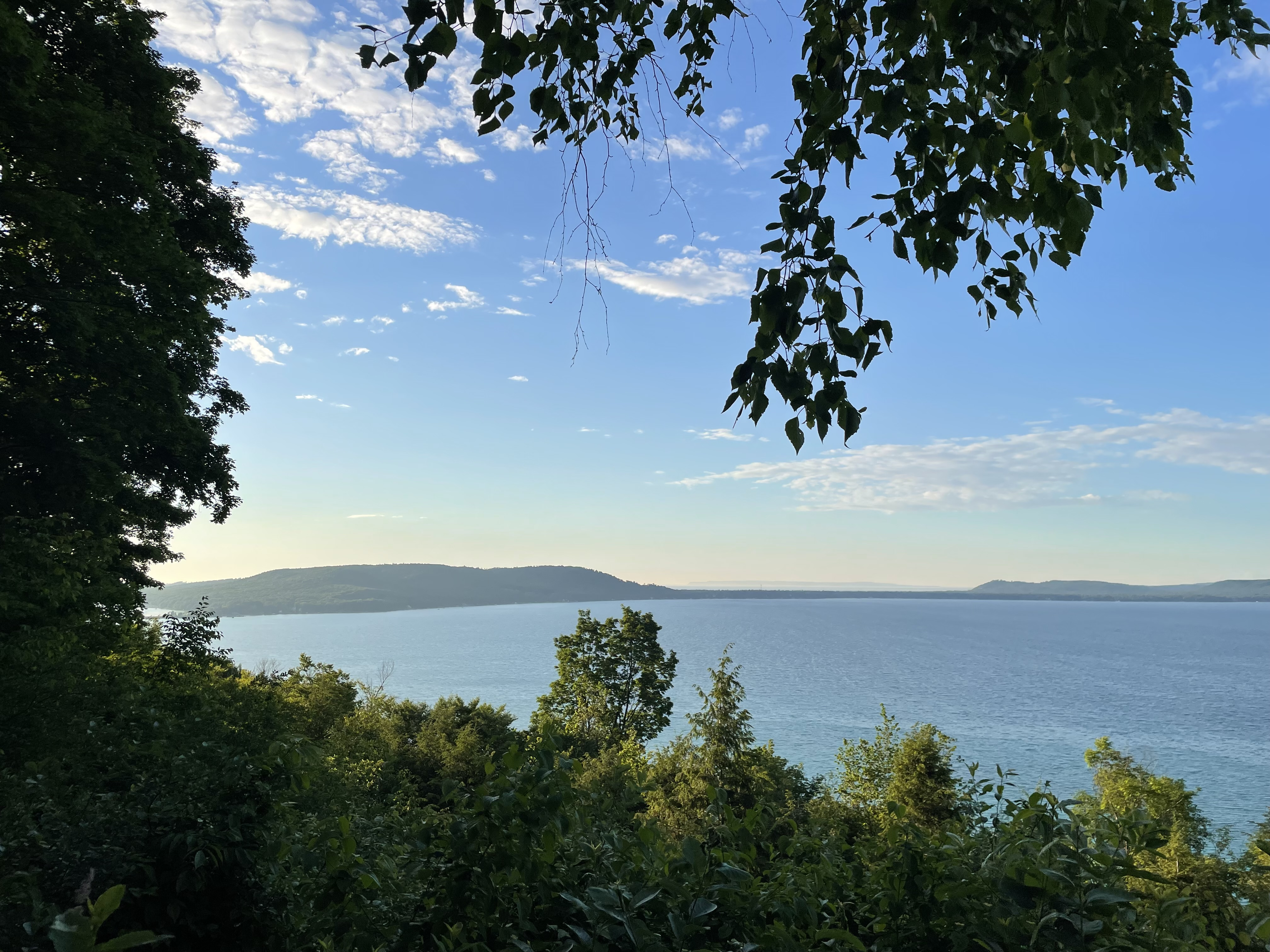
Big Glen Lake from the south, with Glen Arbor visible near the center-right
