= Glen Lake =

Lake in the state of Michigan, United States

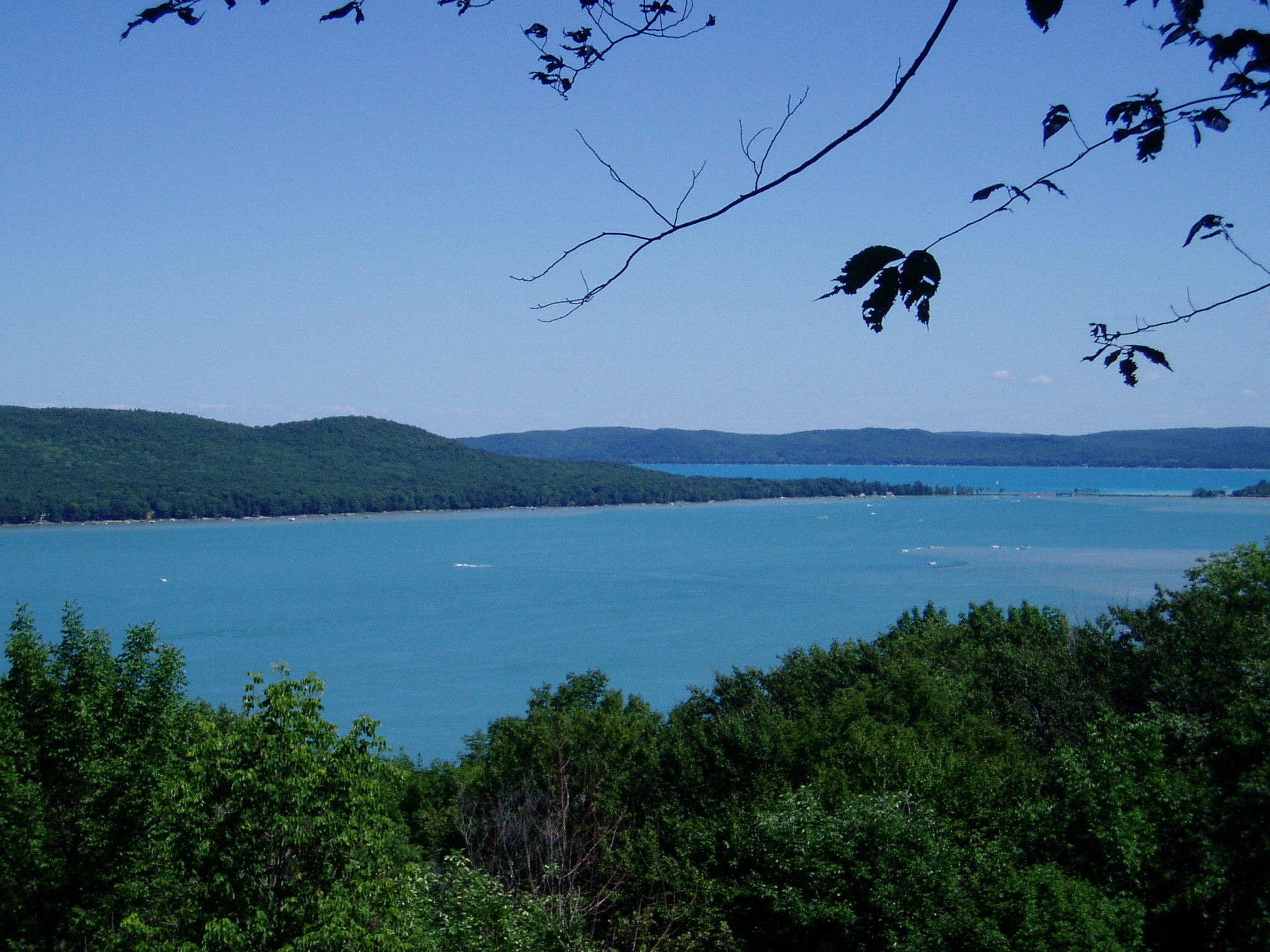
- Little Glen Lake (foreground) and Big Glen Lake (background); note the M-22 causeway at the center-right.

- Location within Michigan
- Location: Empire, Glen Arbor, and Kasson townships, Leelanau County, Michigan, U.S.
- Coordinates: 44°52′N 85°57′W
- Primary inflows: Brooks Lake Outlet, Hatlem Creek
- Primary outflows: Crystal River
- Basin countries: United States
- Surface area: 4,871 acres (19.71 km^{2}) Big; 1,415 acres (5.73 km^{2}) Little; 6,286 acres (25.44 km^{2}) Combined
- Max. depth: 130 ft (40 m) Big; 13 ft (4 m) Little
- Surface elevation: 594 feet (181 m)
- Settlements: Burdickville, Glen Arbor

Glen Lake is a lake located in Northern Michigan. Located in the southwestern Leelanau Peninsula, the lake is directly adjacent to Sleeping Bear Dunes National Lakeshore, and is, at its closest, about 0.94 miles (1.51 km) from Lake Michigan. The lake consists of two large bodies of water connected by a narrow channel, which is traversed by a causeway carrying the famous highway M-22. The body of water on the west of this causeway, which is far shallower and more elongated, is known as Little Glen Lake, and the body of water east of the causeway, which is nearly perfectly round and deeper, is known as Big Glen Lake.

The total area of Glen Lake is 6,286 acres (25 km^{2}), with a maximum depth 130 feet (40 m). The lake empties into Lake Michigan via the shallow Crystal River which winds through Glen Arbor.

== History ==
The area around Glen Lake was first settled by the Odawa, Ojibwe, and Potawatomi peoples, all members of the Council of Three Fires. Since the foundation of nearby Glen Arbor in 1847, Glen Lake and the surrounding area had become very popular with tourists. In 1971, Sleeping Bear Dunes National Lakeshore was created adjacent to the lake to protect the natural beauty of the area.

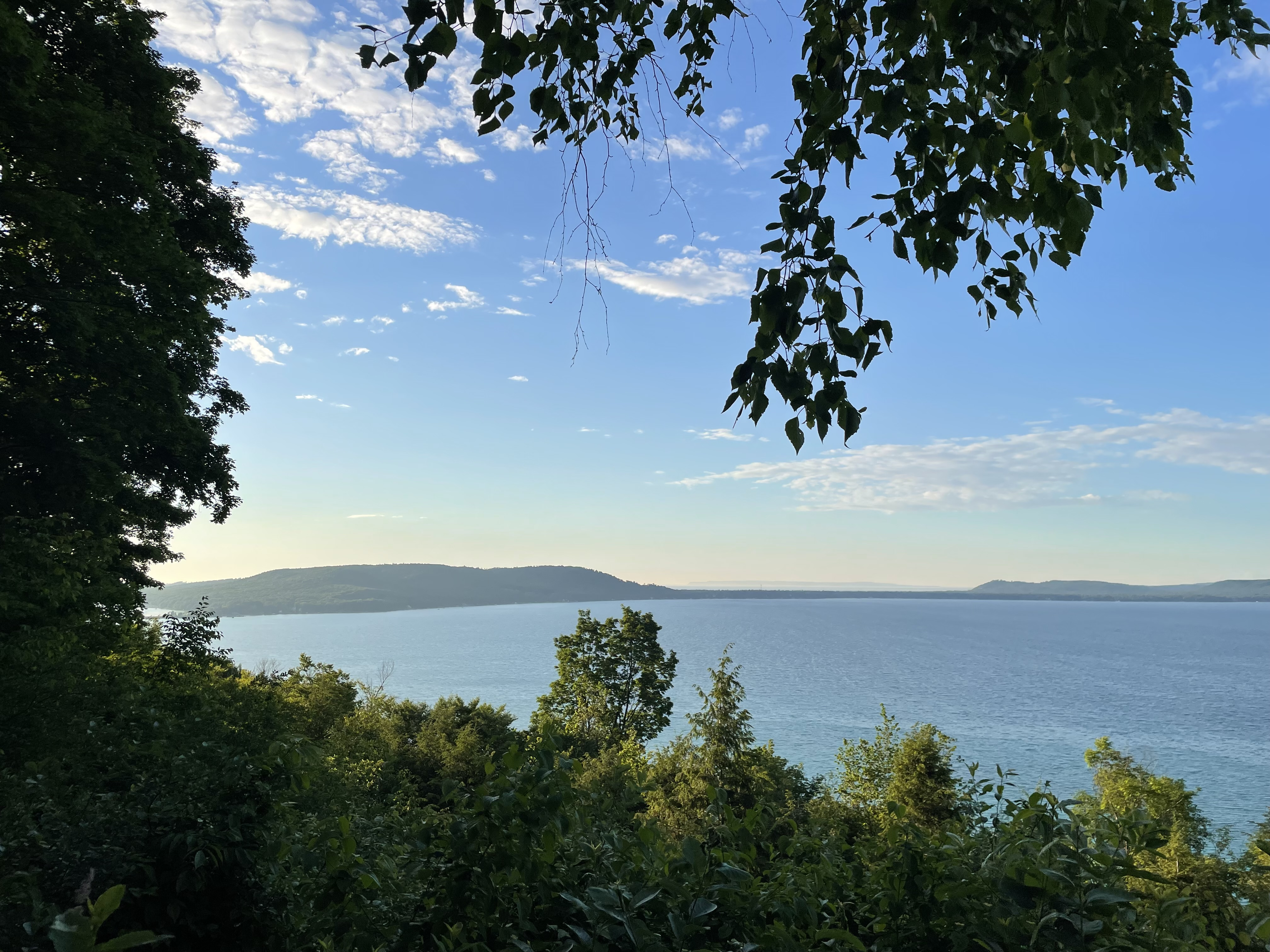
A view of Big Glen Lake from the south. Lake Michigan is visible in the background.

== Geography ==
The lake is situated within the rolling hills and glens of Leelanau County, terrain that is relatively rare for Northwestern Michigan. However, this terrain is natural to the wooded sand hills of the neighboring Sleeping Bear Dunes National Lakeshore. From this terrain is where the lake derives its name.

The lake is divided east–west by a north–south causeway carrying the highway M-22.

The waters of Glen Lake, filtered by the underlying and surrounding sands, are remarkably clear and pure, and glow with an iridescent indigo blue. Its purity and lack of large waves make it a popular lake for vacationers, with opportunities for boating, swimming, and fishing. Sportfish include yellow perch, smallmouth bass, northern pike, brown trout, and lake trout.

== See also ==
- Pierce Stocking Scenic Drive
- List of lakes in Michigan
