= Honeypot (tourism) =

Location that attracts many tourists

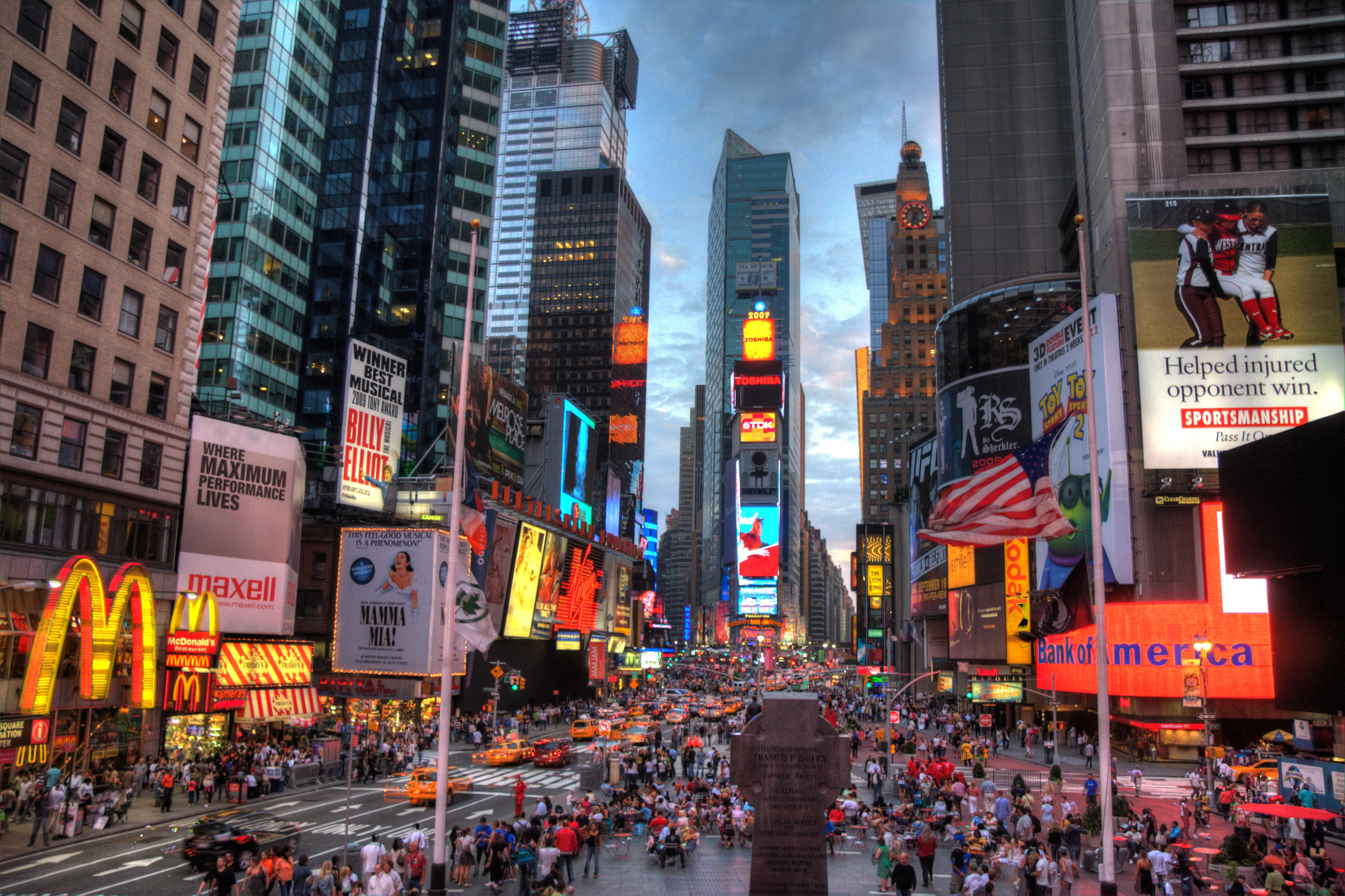
New York City's Times Square is a magnet for tourists, which has led many local businesses to cater to principally tourists

A honeypot site is a location attractive to tourists who, due to their numbers, place pressure on the environment and local people. Honeypots are often used by cities or countries to manage their tourism industry.

The use of honeypots can protect fragile land away from major cities while satisfying tourists. One such example is the establishment of local parks to prevent tourists from damaging more valuable ecosystems further from their main destination. Honeypots have the added benefit of concentrating many income-generating visitors in one place, therefore developing that area, and in turn making it more appealing to tourists. However, honeypots can suffer from problems of overcrowding, including litter, vandalism, and strain on facilities and transport networks.

Honeypots attract tourists due to parking spaces, shopping centres, public parks, and public toilets. The tourist shops are normally placed all over the shopping centre, which creates pressure on the whole centre to keep the area looking tidy. For example, Stratford-upon-Avon has shops that are aimed mostly at tourists. On a particular street, five shops were aimed towards the locals, and ten shops catered to tourists, reflecting the business opportunity that tourism presents for shopkeepers and other businesspeople in the local economy.

The once sleepy medieval village has attracted an increasing number of visitors over recent years and is a classic example of a tourist 'honeypot' ... Ste. Enimie is one of these 'designated' places that are designed to attract people to it and therefore reduce the impact on the surrounding area.

== See also ==
- Tourist city
