= Glen Lake Community School =

Location
- 3375 W. Burdickville Road; Maple City, Michigan 49664; United States
- 44°51′00.6″N 85°55′18.9″W

Information
- Type: Public, coeducational high school
- Established: 1958; 68 years ago
- School district: Glen Lake Community Schools
- Superintendent: Jason Misner
- Principal: Dina Rocheleau (secondary) Ryan Schrock (elementary)
- Teaching staff: 55.77 (on an FTE basis)
- Grades: PreK–12
- Enrollment: 735 (2024–25)
- Student to teacher ratio: 13.18
- Campus type: Rural
- Colors: Black; Gold
- Athletics: MHSAA Division 6; Class C
- Athletics conference: Northwest Conference; Northern Michigan Football League
- Team name: Lakers
- Rival: Frankfort High School; Kingsley High School
- Yearbook: Reflection
- Website: www.glenlakeschools.org

Glen Lake Community School (GLCS) is a public, coeducational K–12 school in Kasson Township, Leelanau County, in the U.S. state of Michigan. Located between Burdickville and Maple City, Glen Lake Community School serves most of southwest and central Leelanau County, and lies near the eponymous Glen Lake.

Most of the school district is in Leelanau County. Places in the district include Cedar, Empire, Glen Arbor, and Maple City. Townships in the district include Empire, Glen Arbor, Kasson, and parts of Centerville, Cleveland, and Solon. The district also includes a portion of Platte Township, Benzie County.

== History ==
The Glen Lake Community Schools District was established in 1958, consolidating the declining local school districts of Cedar, Empire, Glen Arbor, and Maple City.

== Demographics ==
The demographic breakdown of the 735 students enrolled in 2024–25 was:

- Male – 56.6%
- Female – 43.4%
- Native American/Alaskan – 0.4%
- Asian – 0.1%
- Black – 0.5%
- Hispanic – 3.0%
- Native Hawaiian/Pacific Islander – 0%
- White – 94.4%
- Multiracial – 1.5%

Additionally, 234 students (31.8%) were eligible for reduced-price or free lunch.

== Notable alumni ==
- Finn Hogan, college football wide receiver for the Bowling Green Falcons
