= Solon Township, Leelanau County, Michigan =

Solon Township, Michigan
- Civil township
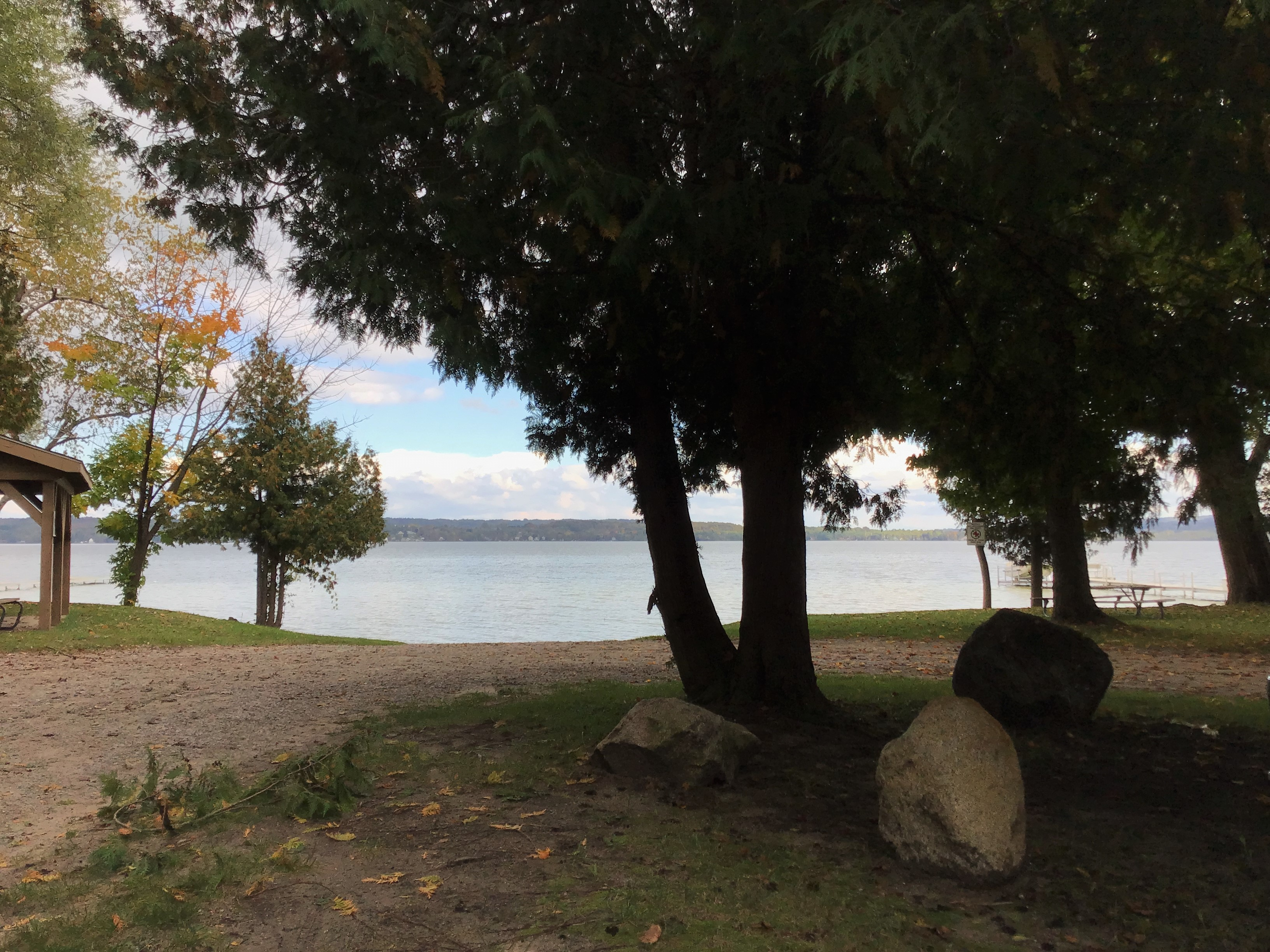
- Lake Leelanau from Solon Township Park
- Motto: The Community that Cares
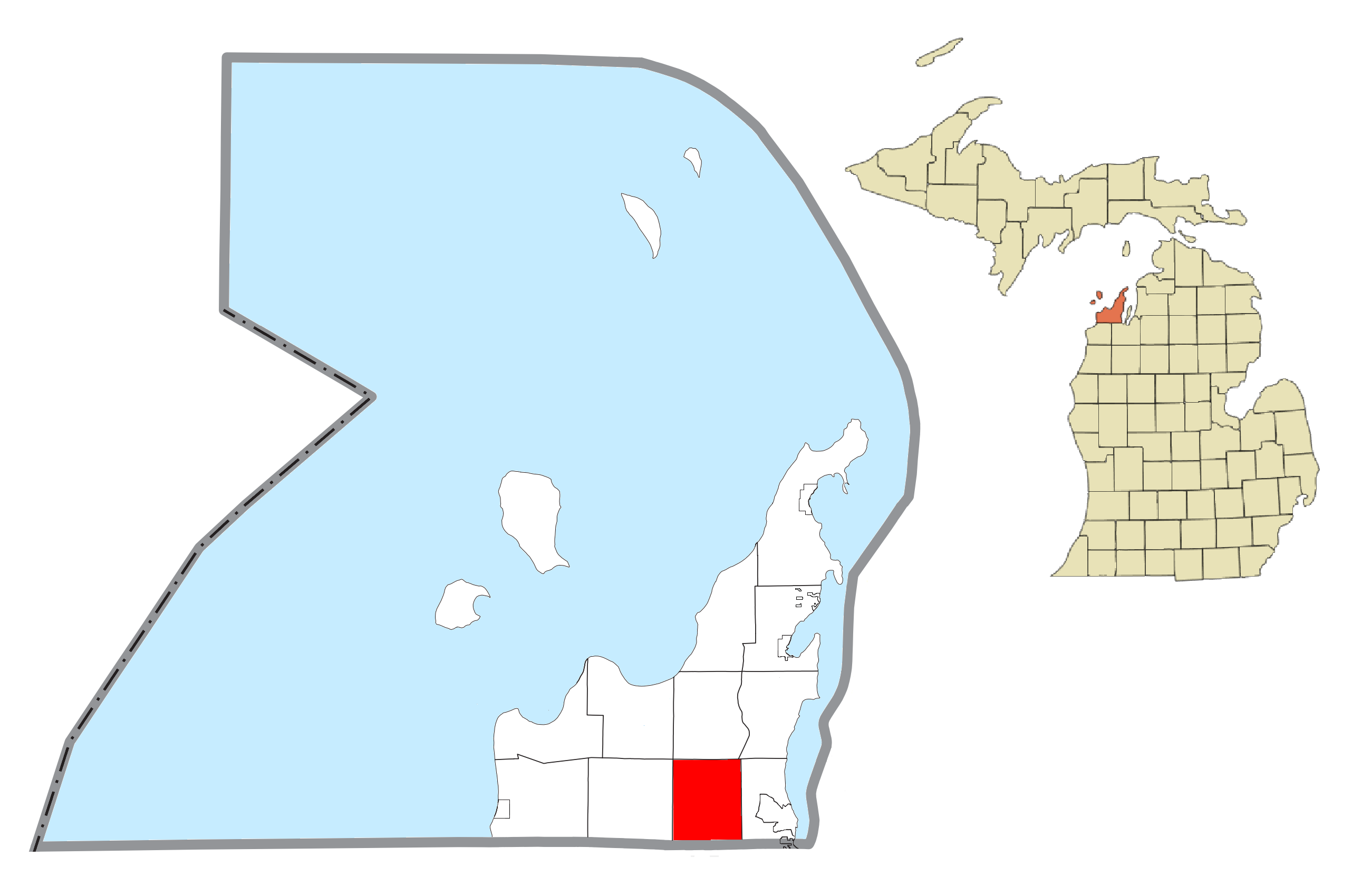
- Location within Leelanau County

- Location within the state of Michigan Solon Township (the United States)
- Coordinates: 44°48′43″N 85°45′54″W
- Country: United States
- State: Michigan
- County: Leelanau
- Organized: October 1871

Area
  - Total: 29.7 sq mi (76.9 km^{2})
  - Land: 26.6 sq mi (68.9 km^{2})
  - Water: 3.1 sq mi (8.0 km^{2})
- Elevation: 610 ft (186 m)

Population (2020)
  - Total: 1,562
  - Density: 58/sq mi (22.4/km^{2})
- Time zone: UTC-5 (Eastern (EST))
  - Summer (DST): UTC-4 (EDT)
- ZIP Code(s): 49621 (Cedar); 49684 (Traverse City)
- Area code: 231
- FIPS code: 26-74500
- GNIS feature ID: 1627089

Solon Township (/ˈsoʊlən/ SOH-lən) is a civil township of Leelanau County in the U.S. state of Michigan. The population was 1,562 at the 2020 census. Solon Township is home to the community of Cedar.

== History ==
Solon Township was organized in October 1871.

== Communities ==
- Cedar is a small unincorporated community at 44°50′52″N 85°47′45″W at the corners of sections five, six, seven and eight. It was founded in approximately 1885 by lumberman Benjamin Boughey. He named it Cedar City because it was in a cedar forest. The depot on the Manistee and North-Eastern Railroad continued to be known as Cedar City, long after the post office named simply Cedar was established on August 15, 1893. The Cedar post office, with ZIP code 49621, serves most of Solon Township as well as a large part of Centerville Township to the north, and smaller portions of Cleveland Township to the northwest, Kasson Township to the west, and Elmwood Township to the east. In 1905, the Cedar State Bank was begun, which survived the Great Depression in 1933, but was closed later in the decade. The bank building was later used for the offices of the Leelanau Telephone Company. Each year in July, Cedar is host to the annual Cedar Polka Festival, which began in 1975.
- Fouch is a small unincorporated community on the south end of Lake Leelanau at 44°50′02″N 85°43′16″W. It is named after John R. Fouch, who settled there in 1866. In 1893, he built a hotel for fishermen, and when the Manistee and North-Eastern Railroad was built, the station on his land was named for him. He became the first postmaster on March 3, 1893. The office closed on November 13, 1895, and was restored as a summer post office on May 20, 1905, and operated until 1908. After Fouch's death, Daniel Perrin acquired the land in 1927 and developed a summer colony known as Perrin's Landing. Fouch Hill, now the site of Timberlee Hills, is just south of Fouch.
- Solon is a small unincorporated community at 44°48′34″N 85°45′40″W on the Cedar Run Creek between sections 21 and 22 in the central part of the township. It was first settled in the 1860s and named for Solon, Ohio, from where many of the settlers had migrated. A post office operated from February 3, 1870, until June 15, 1909.
- The city of Traverse City is to the east and the Traverse City post office with ZIP code 49684 also serves portions of southern and eastern Solon Township.

== Geography ==
According to the United States Census Bureau, the township has a total area of 29.7 square miles (76.9 km^{2}), of which 26.6 square miles (68.9 km^{2}) is land and 3.1 square miles (8.0 km^{2}) (10.40%) is water.

The southern end of Lake Leelanau is located within Solon Township.

=== Climate ===
This climatic region has large seasonal temperature differences, with warm to hot (and often humid) summers and cold (sometimes severely cold) winters. According to the Köppen Climate Classification system, Solon Township has a humid continental climate, abbreviated "Dfb" on climate maps.

Climate data for Solon Township, Leelanau County, Michigan
Month	Jan	Feb	Mar	Apr	May	Jun	Jul	Aug	Sep	Oct	Nov	Dec	Year
Mean daily maximum °F (°C)	28 (−2)	31 (−1)	40 (4)	55 (13)	67 (19)	77 (25)	81 (27)	79 (26)	71 (22)	59 (15)	45 (7)	33 (1)	56 (13)
Mean daily minimum °F (°C)	16 (−9)	15 (−9)	21 (−6)	32 (0)	42 (6)	51 (11)	57 (14)	57 (14)	50 (10)	40 (4)	31 (−1)	21 (−6)	36 (2)
Average precipitation inches (mm)	2.8 (71)	2 (51)	2 (51)	2.7 (69)	2.8 (71)	3 (76)	2.6 (66)	3.2 (81)	4.2 (110)	3.4 (86)	3.2 (81)	2.9 (74)	34.7 (880)
Source: Weatherbase

== Demographics ==
As of the census of 2000, there were 1,542 people, 595 households, and 464 families residing in the township. The population density was 57.9 inhabitants per square mile (22.4/km^{2}). There were 738 housing units at an average density of 27.7 per square mile (10.7/km^{2}). The racial makeup of the township was 97.21% White, 0.13% African American, 0.84% Native American, 0.71% Asian, 0.32% from other races, and 0.78% from two or more races. Hispanic or Latino of any race were 0.45% of the population.

There were 595 households, out of which 35.1% had children under the age of 18 living with them, 66.7% were married couples living together, 7.7% had a female householder with no husband present, and 22.0% were non-families. 18.2% of all households were made up of individuals, and 6.2% had someone living alone who was 65 years of age or older. The average household size was 2.59 and the average family size was 2.95.

In the township the population was spread out, with 26.5% under the age of 18, 5.4% from 18 to 24, 28.9% from 25 to 44, 26.7% from 45 to 64, and 12.5% who were 65 years of age or older. The median age was 39 years. For every 100 females, there were 95.4 males. For every 100 females age 18 and over, there were 93.3 males.

The median income for a household in the township was $47,448, and the median income for a family was $53,571. Males had a median income of $37,045 versus $25,481 for females. The per capita income for the township was $22,987. About 2.2% of families and 3.6% of the population were below the poverty line, including 3.4% of those under age 18 and 4.5% of those age 65 or over.
