= Elmwood Township, Michigan =

Elmwood Township is the name of some townships in the U.S. state of Michigan:

- Elmwood Township, Leelanau County, Michigan
- Elmwood Township, Tuscola County, Michigan

== See also ==
- Elmwood, Michigan (disambiguation)
