= Elmwood Township, Leelanau County, Michigan =

Elmwood Township, Michigan
- Charter township
- Charter Township of Elmwood
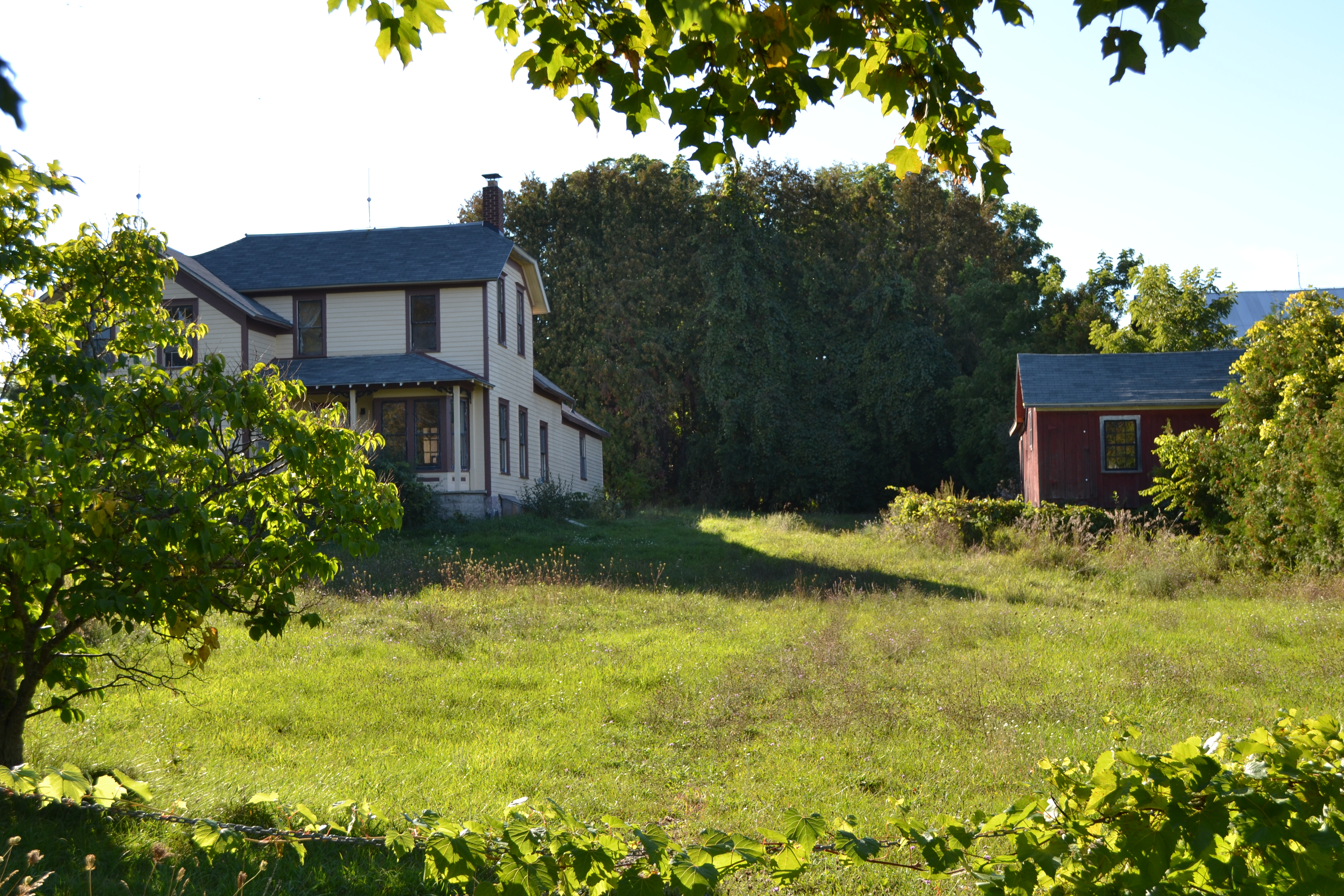
- Campbell-De Young Farm
- Nickname: "Gateway to Leelanau County"
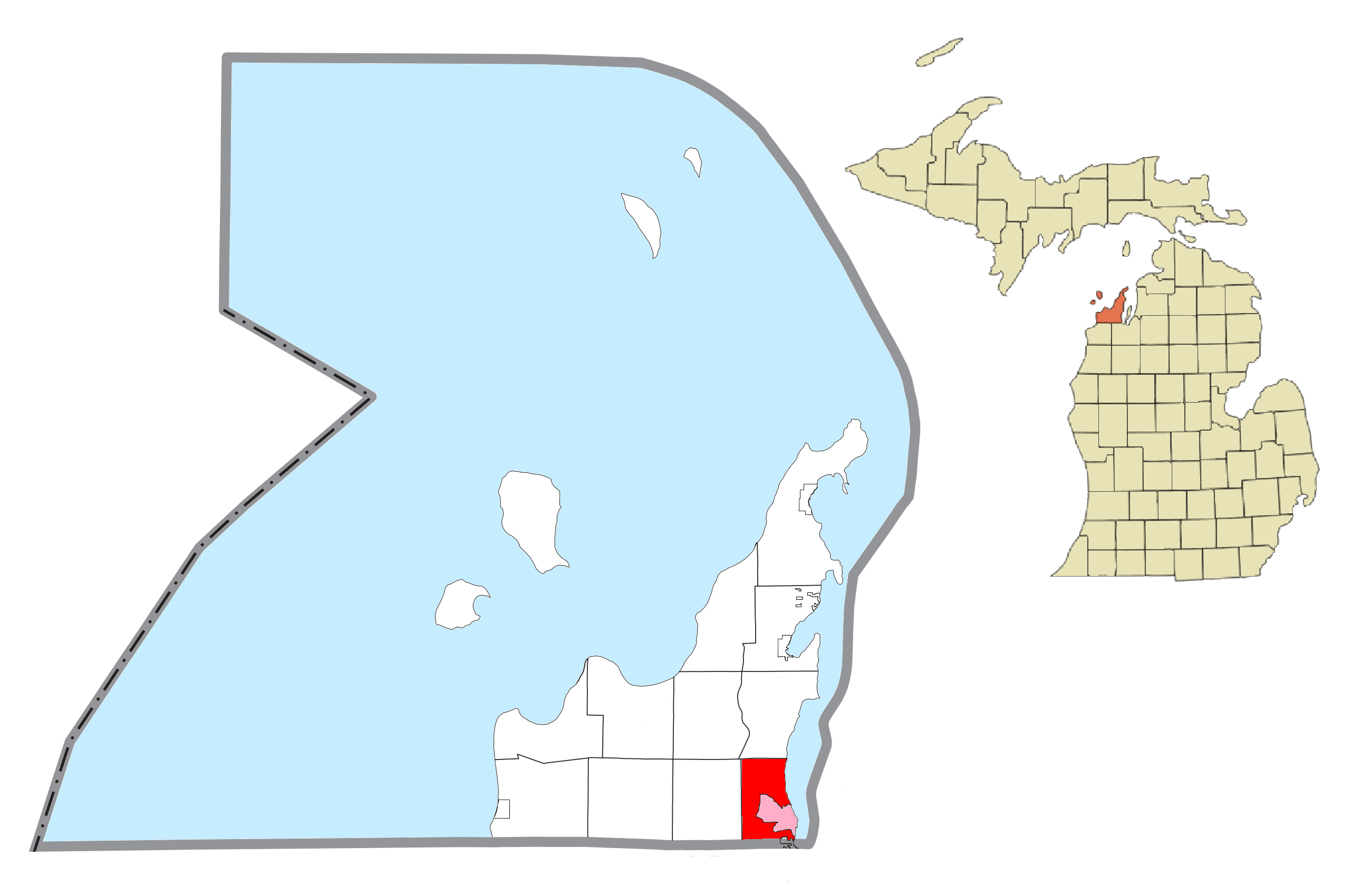
- Location within Leelanau County (red) and the administered community of Greilickville (pink)

- Location within the state of Michigan
- Coordinates: 44°48′23″N 85°40′13″W
- Country: United States
- State: Michigan
- County: Leelanau
- Organized: 1863
- Charter: 1987

Government
  - Supervisor: Jeff Shaw
  - Clerk: Connie M. Preston

Area
  - Total: 30.9 sq mi (80.0 km^{2})
  - Land: 20.0 sq mi (51.9 km^{2})
  - Water: 10.8 sq mi (28.1 km^{2})
- Elevation: 620 ft (189 m)

Population (2020)
  - Total: 4,892
  - Estimate (2025): 5,039
  - Density: 213/sq mi (82.1/km^{2})
- Time zone: UTC-5 (Eastern (EST))
  - Summer (DST): UTC-4 (EDT)
- ZIP code(s): 49621 (Cedar); 49684 (Traverse City)
- Area code: 231
- FIPS code: 26-25700
- GNIS feature ID: 1626235

Elmwood Township is a charter township of Leelanau County in the U.S. state of Michigan. The population was 4,892 at the 2020 census, making it the largest township in Leelanau County by population. The southeasternmost township of Leelanau County, Elmwood Township is suburbanized, as it is immediately adjacent Traverse City, the largest city in Northern Michigan.

== History ==
Elmwood Township was organized on December 21, 1863.

In 1987, Elmwood Township was granted a charter, and converted from a civil township to a charter township, due largely to growth in and around Traverse City. In 1989, the city of Traverse City annexed the southeasternmost corner of the township.

== Geography ==
According to the United States Census Bureau, the township has a total area of 30.9 square miles (80 km^{2}), of which 20.1 square miles (52 km^{2}) is land and 10.8 square miles (28 km^{2}) (35.08%) is water.

Elmwood Township lies upon the West Arm of Grand Traverse Bay. Part of Lake Leelanau is located within the far northwest of Elmwood Township.

=== Adjacent municipalities ===
By land

- Traverse City (southeast)
- Garfield Township, Grand Traverse County (south)
- Long Lake Township, Grand Traverse County (southwest)
- Solon Township (west)
- Bingham Township (north)

By water

- Centerville Township (northwest, through Lake Leelanau)
- Peninsula Township, Grand Traverse County (east, through Grand Traverse Bay)

=== Major highways ===
- M-22 runs in the east of the township along Grand Traverse Bay. The highway loops around the Leelanau Peninsula and follows Lake Michigan south to Manistee.
- M-72 runs along the southern border of the township with Grand Traverse County. To the west, the highway ends in nearby Empire. To the east, the highway runs through Traverse City towards Kalkaska and Lake Huron.

== Communities ==
- Crystal Spring is a small settlement in the northeast of the township on M-22. It is located at 44°49′28″N 85°38′55.28″W. Today, Crystal Spring is part of the Greilickville CDP.
- Greilickville is a census-designated place (CDP) located within the southeast of the township. The community largely serves as the population center of the township, and serves as a suburb of neighboring Traverse City.
- Hatchs (also known as Hatch's Crossing) is a former railroad station in the center of the township. The settlement was built on the Manistee and North-Eastern Railroad, which is now the Leelanau Trail. Hatchs is located at 44°49′37″N 85°40′52.29″W.
- Heimforth is a former settlement on Lake Leelanau, in the northwest of the township, at 44°51′27″N 85°42′32.29″W.
- Traverse City shares a border with Elmwood Township.

== Demographics ==
As of the census of 2000, there were 4,264 people, 1,697 households, and 1,259 families residing in the township. The population density was 212.6 inhabitants per square mile (82.1/km^{2}). There were 1,914 housing units at an average density of 95.4 per square mile (36.8/km^{2}). The racial makeup of the township was 97.26% White, 0.28% African American, 0.89% Native American, 0.21% Asian, 0.52% from other races, and 0.84% from two or more races. Hispanic or Latino of any race were 2.39% of the population.

There were 1,697 households, out of which 31.3% had children under the age of 18 living with them, 64.8% were married couples living together, 6.9% had a female householder with no husband present, and 25.8% were non-families. 20.3% of all households were made up of individuals, and 7.8% had someone living alone who was 65 years of age or older. The average household size was 2.51 and the average family size was 2.89.

In the township the population was spread out, with 23.9% under the age of 18, 5.9% from 18 to 24, 27.1% from 25 to 44, 28.1% from 45 to 64, and 15.1% who were 65 years of age or older. The median age was 41 years. For every 100 females, there were 99.3 males. For every 100 females age 18 and over, there were 95.7 males.

The median income for a household in the township was $51,063, and the median income for a family was $55,597. Males had a median income of $41,458 versus $27,500 for females. The per capita income for the township was $27,574. About 1.3% of families and 3.3% of the population were below the poverty line, including 3.6% of those under age 18 and 2.5% of those age 65 or over.

== Education ==
Most of Elmwood Township is served by the Traverse City Area Public Schools district, with coeducational public schools to the south in Grand Traverse County. However, a few square miles of northeastern Elmwood Township are served by Suttons Bay Public Schools, with coeducational public schools to the north in Suttons Bay.
