= Solon Township, Michigan =

Solon Township is the name of some places in the U.S. state of Michigan:

- Solon Township, Kent County, Michigan
- Solon Township, Leelanau County, Michigan
