= Good Harbor, Michigan =

Coordinates: 44°56′45″N 85°48′12″W

Good Harbor, Michigan is a former community in Centerville Township, Leelanau County, Michigan. Located along Lake Michigan, the village was established in the mid-1870s when a sawmill was built there. The village grew to include a hotel, stores, a saloon, a school, a post office, and a 500-foot-long dock. In 1905, the sawmill burned down. The town was abandoned, with the post office closing in 1907. The remaining buildings were torn down in 1924. Today, the site of the former town is part of the Sleeping Bear Dunes National Lakeshore.

== Sources ==
- Romig, Walter (1986). Michigan Place Names. Detroit: Wayne State University Press. p. 228. ISBN 978-0-8143-1838-6 – via Google Books.
