= Elmwood, Michigan =

Elmwood may refer to the following places in the U.S. state of Michigan:

- Elmwood, Tuscola County, Michigan, an unincorporated community in Elmwood Township
- Elmwood, Iron County, Michigan, an unincorporated community in Stambaugh Township

== See also ==
- Elmwood Cemetery (Detroit)
- Elmwood Township, Michigan (disambiguation)
