= Kasson Township, Michigan =

- Civil township
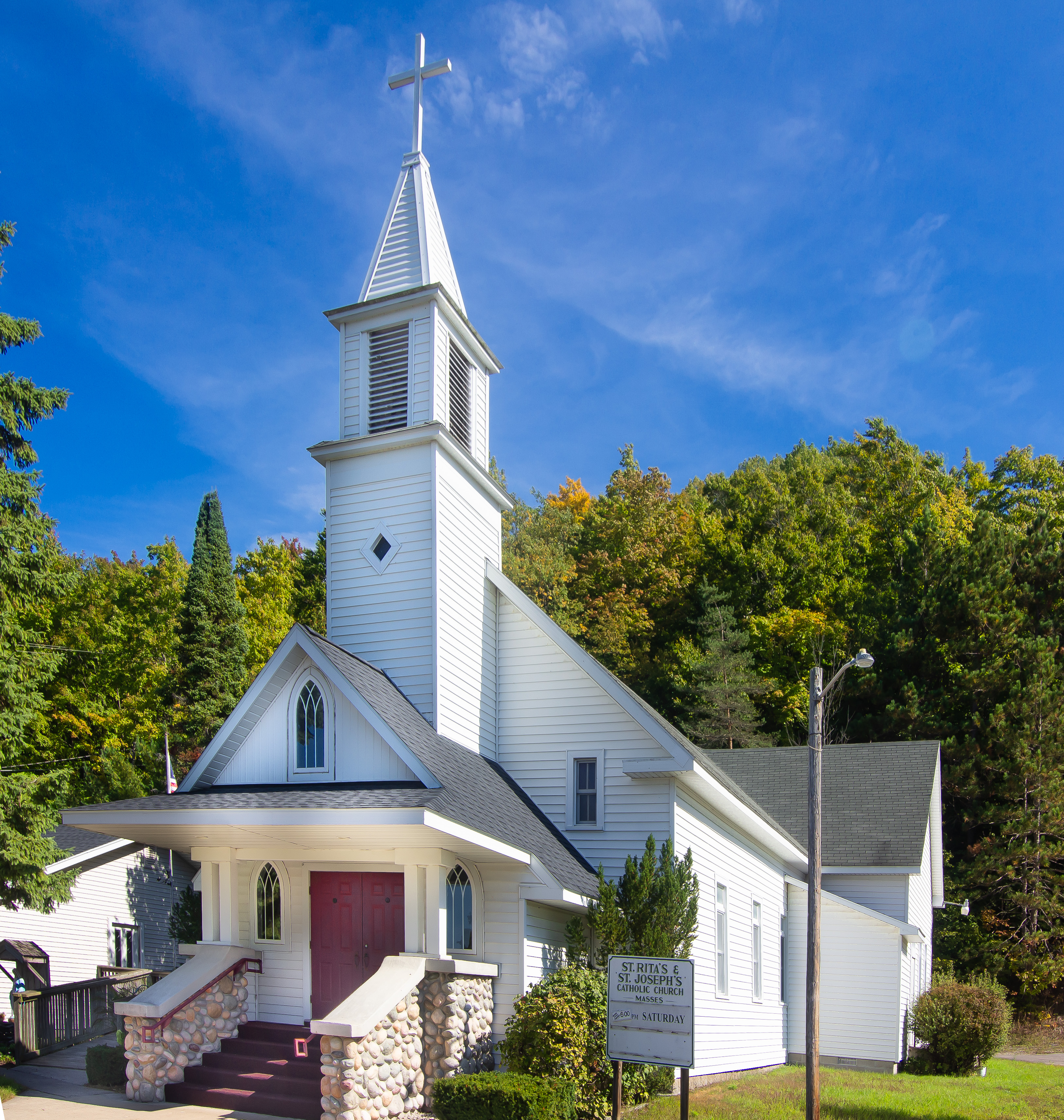
- St. Rita's & St. Joseph's Catholic Church in Maple City

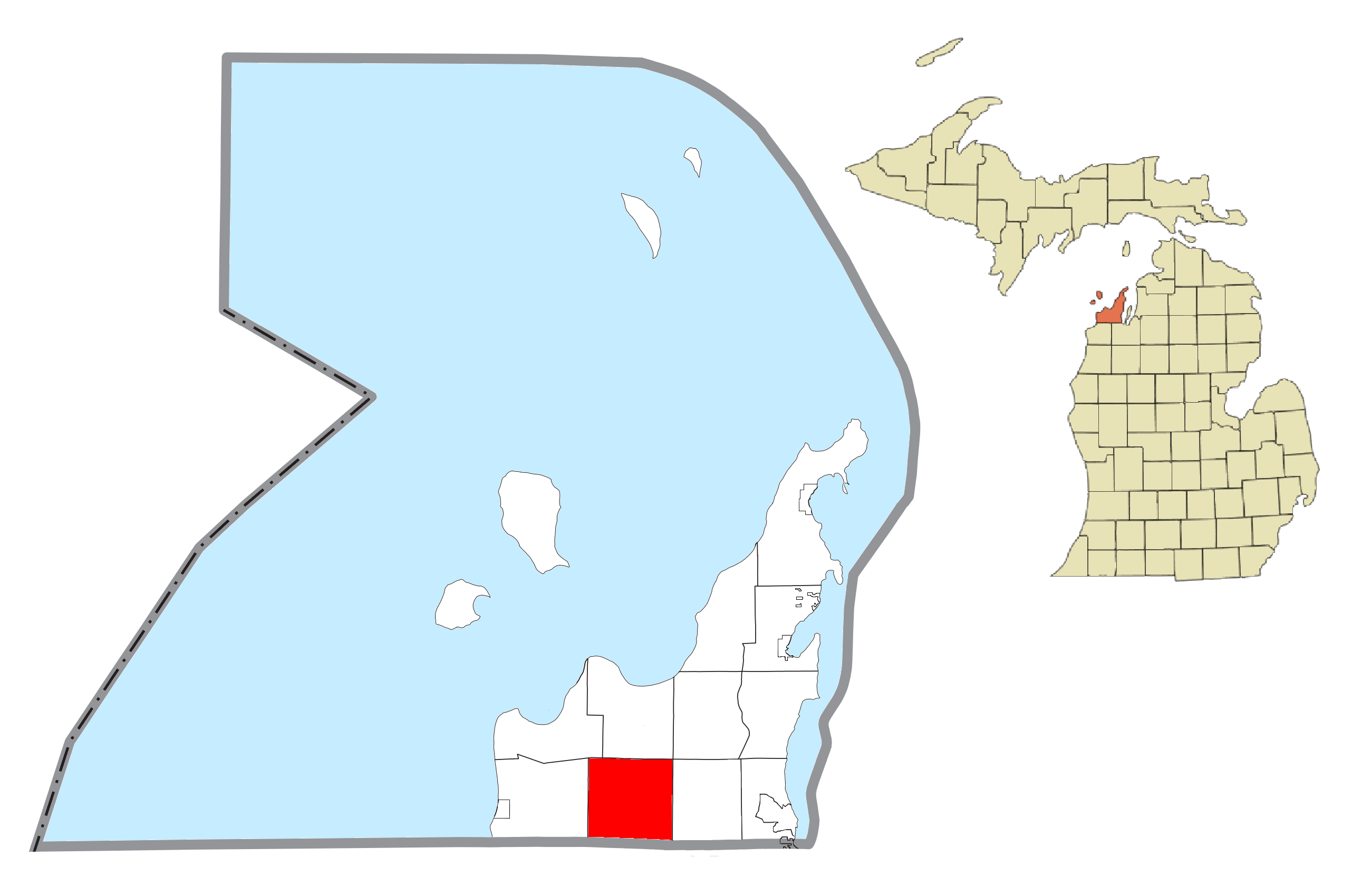
- Location within Leelanau County

- Location within the state of Michigan Kasson Township (the United States)
- Coordinates: 44°49′44″N 85°52′39″W
- Country: United States
- State: Michigan
- County: Leelanau
- Organized: 1865
- Named for: Kasson Freeman

Area
  - Total: 36.2 sq mi (93.8 km^{2})
  - Land: 35.9 sq mi (93.0 km^{2})
  - Water: 0.31 sq mi (0.8 km^{2})
- Elevation: 912 ft (278 m)

Population (2020)
  - Total: 1,647
  - Density: 44/sq mi (16.9/km^{2})
- Time zone: UTC-5 (Eastern (EST))
  - Summer (DST): UTC-4 (EDT)
- ZIP code(s): 49621 (Cedar); 49630 (Empire); 49664 (Maple City); 49684 (Traverse City)
- Area code: 231
- FIPS code: 26-42320
- GNIS feature ID: 1626551

Kasson Township (/kæsən/ KASS-ən) is a civil township of Leelanau County in the U.S. state of Michigan. The population was 1,647 as of the 2020 census. A small portion of the township is included in the Sleeping Bear Dunes National Lakeshore.

== History ==
Kasson Township was organized in 1865. It was named for Kasson Freeman, the first county surveyor of Leelanau County, from 1863 to 1865.

== Geography ==
According to the United States Census Bureau, the township has a total area of 36.2 square miles (94 km^{2}), of which 35.9 square miles (93 km^{2}) is land and 0.3 square miles (0.78 km^{2}) (0.83%) is water.

Kasson Township includes a small shoreline on Glen Lake. Glen Lake Community School is located in the northwest of the township.

=== Major highway ===
- M-72 is an east–west highway running through the south of the township. The highway can be used to access Empire (to the west) and Traverse City (to the east).

== Communities ==
- Maple City is a census-designated place in the north of Kasson Township.

== Demographics ==
As of the census of 2000, there were 1,577 people, 557 households, and 443 families residing in the township. The population density was 43.9 inhabitants per square mile (16.9/km^{2}). There were 665 housing units at an average density of 18.5 per square mile (7.1/km^{2}). The racial makeup of the township was 97.27% White, 0.06% African American, 0.82% Native American, 0.44% Asian, 0.19% from other races, and 1.20% from two or more races. Hispanic or Latino of any race were 1.40% of the population.

There were 557 households, out of which 42.9% had children under the age of 18 living with them, 66.6% were married couples living together, 9.9% had a female householder with no husband present, and 20.3% were non-families. 16.5% of all households were made up of individuals, and 3.1% had someone living alone who was 65 years of age or older. The average household size was 2.78 and the average family size was 3.15.

In the township the population was spread out, with 30.9% under the age of 18, 5.6% from 18 to 24, 29.5% from 25 to 44, 23.8% from 45 to 64, and 10.1% who were 65 years of age or older. The median age was 37 years. For every 100 females, there were 98.1 males. For every 100 females age 18 and over, there were 95.5 males.

The median income for a household in the township was $41,726, and the median income for a family was $45,662. Males had a median income of $32,788 versus $24,038 for females. The per capita income for the township was $19,319. About 3.5% of families and 5.1% of the population were below the poverty line, including 4.2% of those under age 18 and 8.3% of those age 65 or over.
