= Greilickville, Michigan =

- Census-designated place (CDP) & unincorporated community
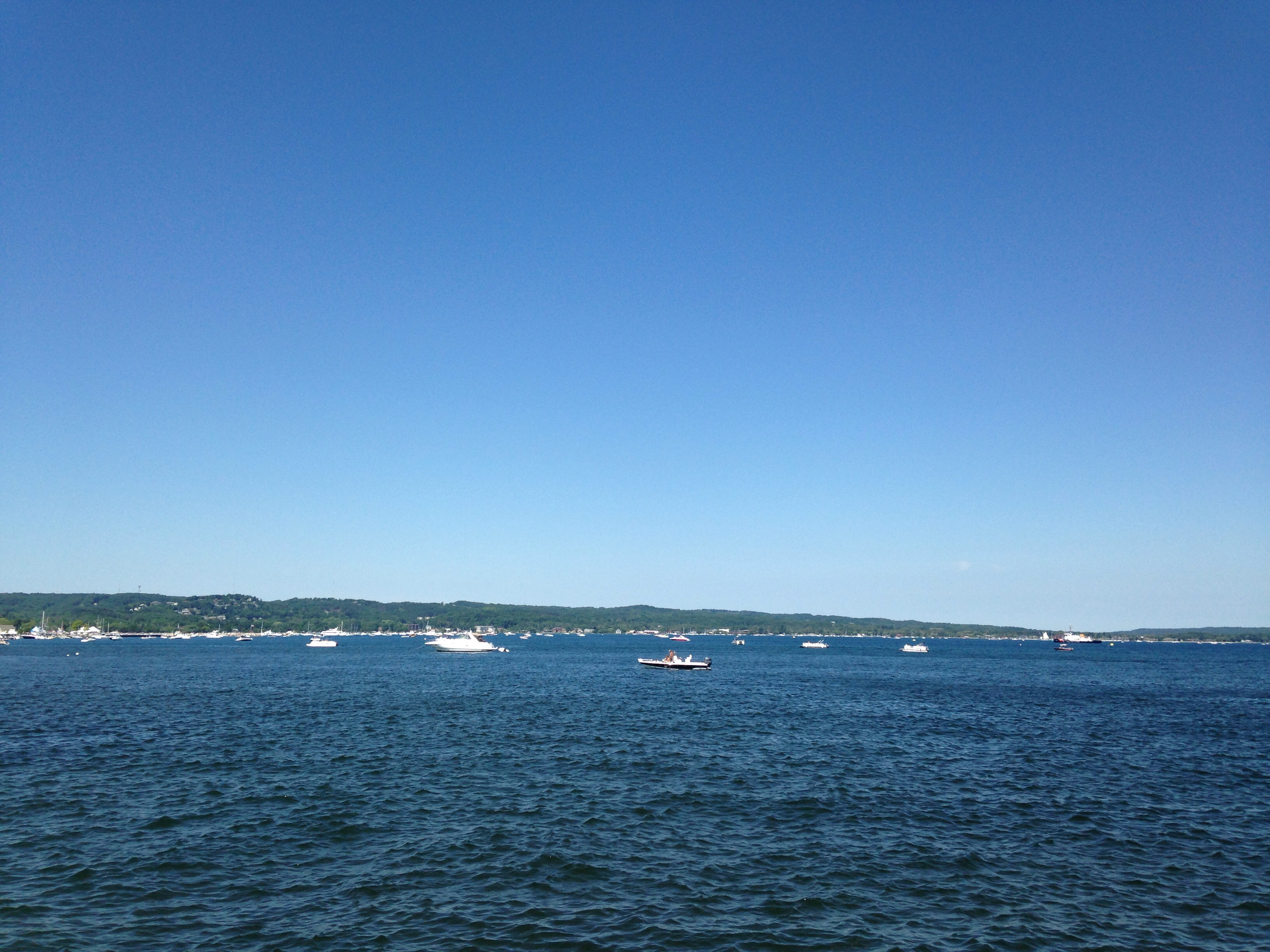
- Greilickville on the shore of Grand Traverse Bay, from Traverse City

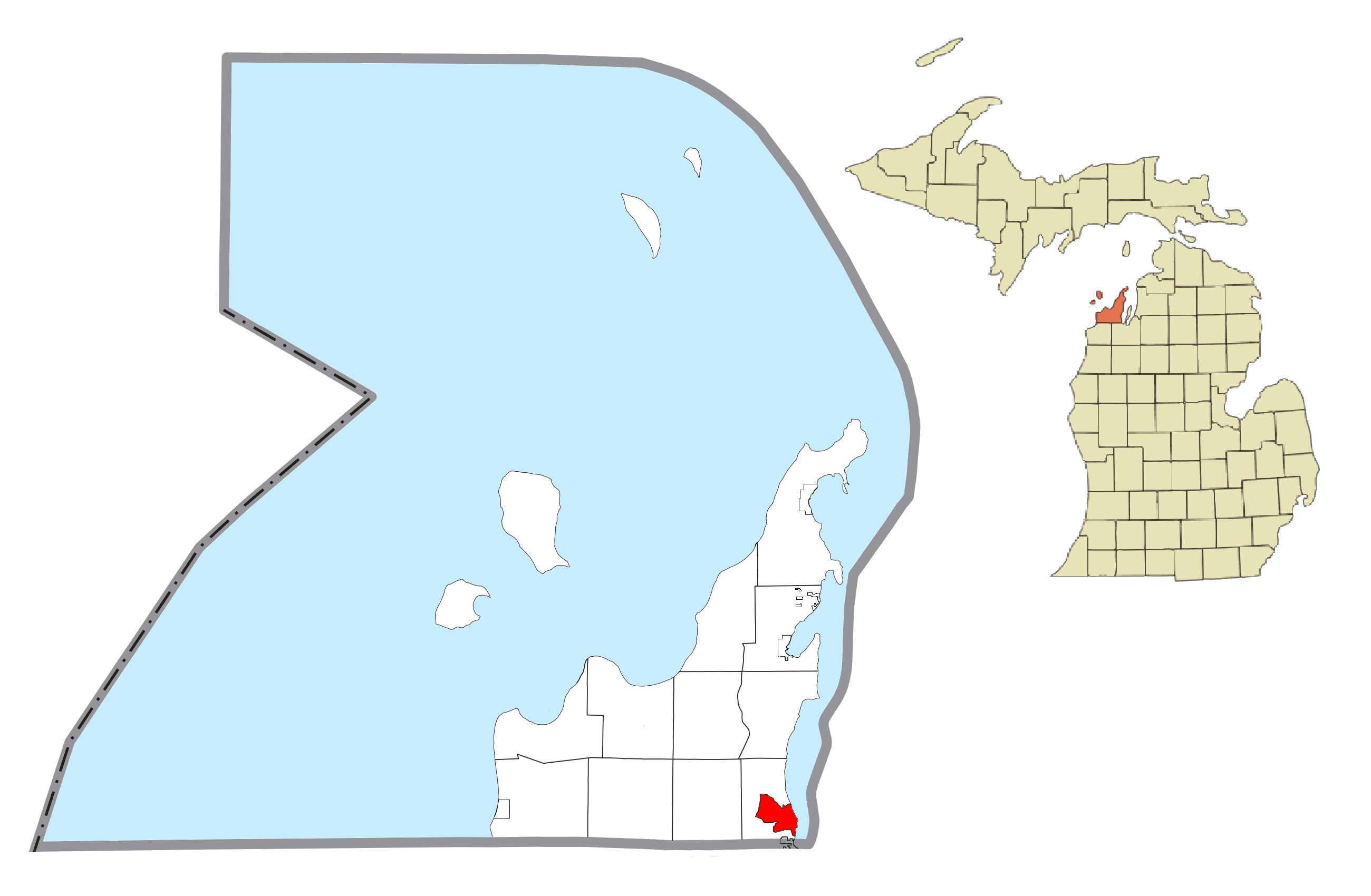
- Location within Leelanau County

- Location in Michigan Location in the United States
- Coordinates: 44°46′59″N 85°38′19″W
- Country: United States
- State: Michigan
- County: Leelanau
- Township: Elmwood

Area
  - Total: 7.19 sq mi (18.61 km^{2})
  - Land: 4.59 sq mi (11.90 km^{2})
  - Water: 2.59 sq mi (6.72 km^{2})
- Elevation: 584 ft (178 m)

Population (2020)
  - Total: 1,634
  - Density: 355.7/sq mi (137.35/km^{2})
- Time zone: UTC-5 (Eastern (EST))
  - Summer (DST): UTC-4 (EDT)
- ZIP Code: 49684 (Traverse City)
- Area code: 231
- FIPS code: 26-35300
- GNIS feature ID: 627411

Greilickville (/ˈɡraɪlɪkvɪl, ɡreɪ-/ GRY-lik-vil, GRAY-) is an unincorporated community and census-designated place (CDP) in Leelanau County in the U.S. state of Michigan. At the 2020 census, the population was 1,634, up from 1,530 at the 2010 census. The community is located within Elmwood Charter Township, and is located in the extreme southeast of the Leelanau Peninsula.

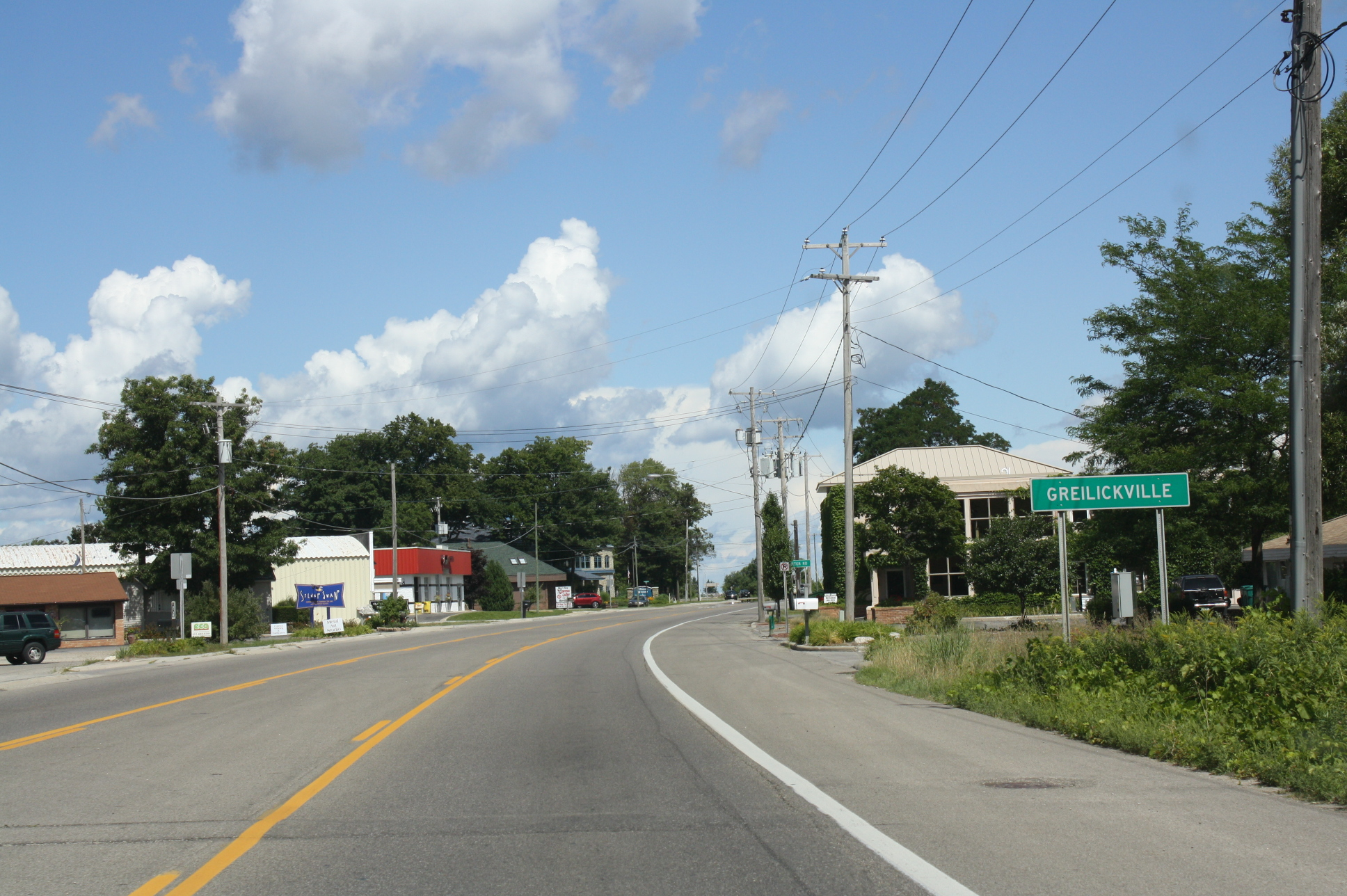
Sign for Greilickville along M-22.

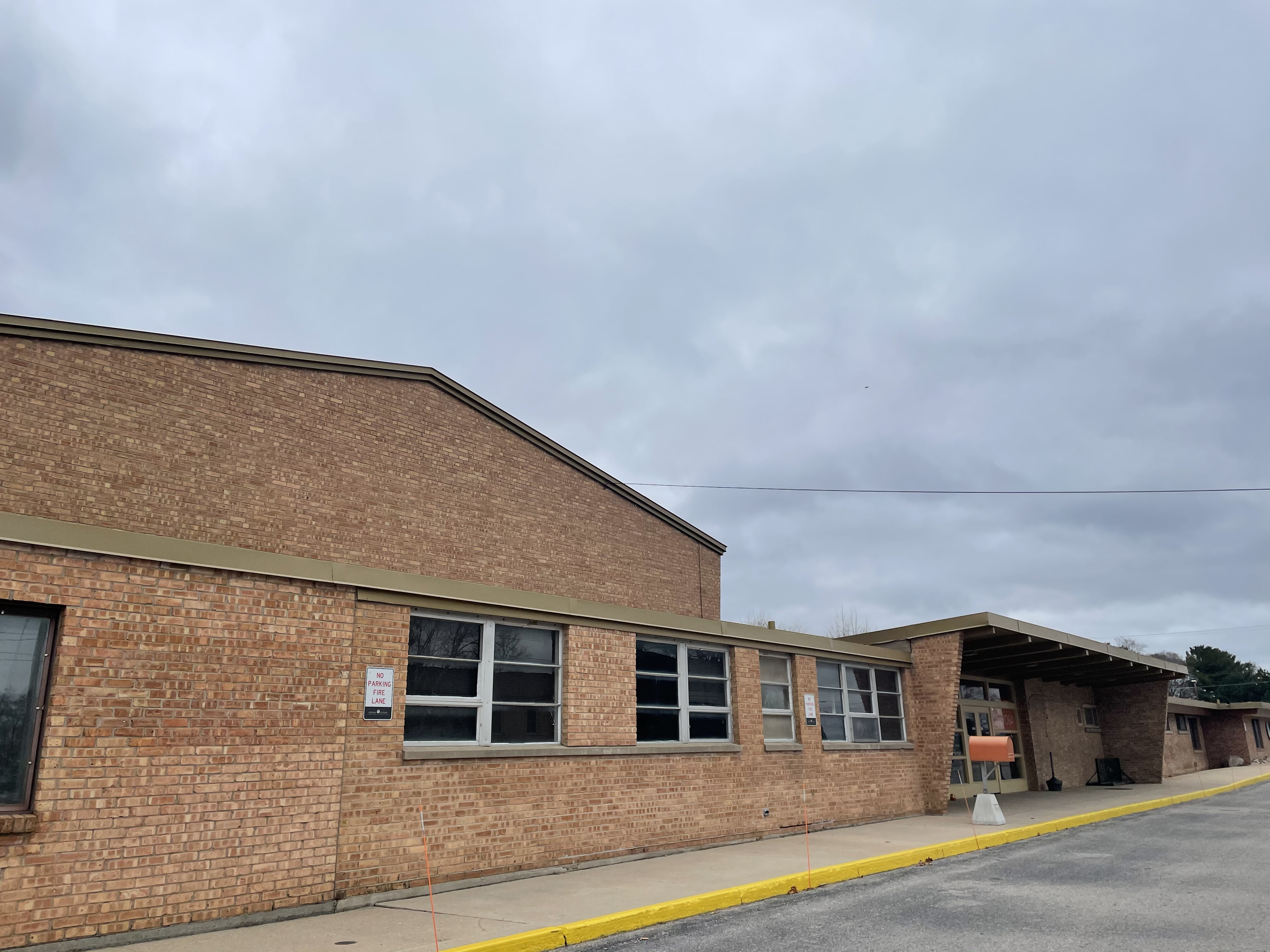
The former Norris Elementary School in 2020.

The community is located on the western shore of the West Arm of Grand Traverse Bay, a bay of Lake Michigan. Greilickville is immediately northwest of Traverse City, and is part of that city's urban area. Greilickville is the largest community in Leelanau County by population.

== History ==
The Greilickville area was settled by Godfrey Greilick and his family in 1856, recently emigrating from Bohemia. Greilick operated a number of sawmills in southeast Leelanau County. In 1875, brothers Albert and Seth H. Norris established a settlement on the shore of Grand Traverse Bay consisting of a grist mill, tannery, brickyard, and pottery factory, as well as a post office with the name Norrisville. The post office lasted from September 1881 to June 1882, and again from May 1884 to July 1902. In 1874, James W. Markham purchased the Norris' brickyard, expanding it and establishing commercial service. Markham Bricks, renowned for their pale yellow color derived from sediments in Cedar Lake, was supplied to build much of nearby Traverse City and the Traverse City State Hospital.

In 1893, an extension of the Manistee and North-Eastern Railroad was opened through the community, with a station named Greilickville, in honor of Godfrey Greilick. The community later took on the name. In the early 20th century, Greilickville transitioned to a tourism-based economy, and established itself as a convenient location for tall ships to drop off tourists to the region.

In 1961, when Greilickville's population was about 900, a special election was held in sections 28 and 33 of Elmwood Township, including Greilickville, to decide a proposal regarding making those areas a home-rule village called Elmwood. The proposal was defeated by a vote of 238 to 88.

In 1995, the Leelanau Trail, a public rail trail, opened on the right-of-way of the former Manistee and North-Eastern Railroad.

== Geography ==
Greilickville is in the southeastern corner of Leelanau County and of Elmwood Charter Township. It is bordered to the south by Traverse City in Grand Traverse County and to the east by the West Arm of Grand Traverse Bay, part of Lake Michigan. The CDP extends north to the north end of Cedar Lake and west to Bugai Road. Michigan highway M-22 runs through the east side of Greilickville along the shore of Grand Traverse Bay, leading south into Traverse City and north 14 miles (23 km) to Suttons Bay.

According to the United States Census Bureau, the Greilickville CDP has a total area of 7.1 square miles (18.4 km^{2}), of which 4.5 square miles (11.7 km^{2}) are land and 2.6 square miles (6.7 km^{2}), or 36.47%, are water.

=== Major highway ===
- M-22 is a north–south route that parallels the shore of Grand Traverse Bay. The route is popular among tourists, and can be used to access Traverse City, to the south, and Suttons Bay and Northport to the north. South of Greilickville, M-22 reaches junctions with US 31, M-37, and M-72.

== Demographics ==
Historical population
Census	Pop.	Note	%±
2000	1,415		—
2010	1,530		8.1%
2020	1,634		6.8%
U.S. Decennial Census

=== 2020 census ===
As of the 2020 census, Greilickville had a population of 1,634. The median age was 57.5 years. 15.2% of residents were under the age of 18 and 39.8% of residents were 65 years of age or older. For every 100 females there were 91.1 males, and for every 100 females age 18 and over there were 90.1 males age 18 and over.

93.2% of residents lived in urban areas, while 6.8% lived in rural areas.

There were 766 households in Greilickville, of which 22.8% had children under the age of 18 living in them. Of all households, 57.3% were married-couple households, 10.8% were households with a male householder and no spouse or partner present, and 24.9% were households with a female householder and no spouse or partner present. About 28.2% of all households were made up of individuals and 20.1% had someone living alone who was 65 years of age or older.

There were 867 housing units, of which 11.6% were vacant. The homeowner vacancy rate was 1.5% and the rental vacancy rate was 4.9%.

Racial composition as of the 2020 census
Race	Number	Percent
White	1,529	93.6%
Black or African American	4	0.2%
American Indian and Alaska Native	14	0.9%
Asian	4	0.2%
Native Hawaiian and Other Pacific Islander	0	0.0%
Some other race	10	0.6%
Two or more races	73	4.5%
Hispanic or Latino (of any race)	44	2.7%

=== 2000 census ===
At the time of the 2000 census, there were 1,415 people, 624 households and 431 families residing in the CDP. The population density was 314.4 inhabitants per square mile (121.4/km^{2}). There were 677 housing units at an average density of 150.4 per square mile (58.1/km^{2}). The racial makeup of the CDP was 97.95% White, 0.64% African American, 0.35% Native American, 0.07% Asian, 0.21% from other races, and 0.78% from two or more races. Hispanic or Latino of any race were 0.57% of the population.

There were 624 households, of which 21.5% had children under the age of 18 living with them, 59.5% were married couples living together, 7.2% had a female householder with no husband present, and 30.8% were non-families. 25.3% of all households were made up of individuals, and 12.8% had someone living alone who was 65 years of age or older. The average household size was 2.27 and the average family size was 2.67.

18.2% of the population were under the age of 18, 4.8% from 18 to 24, 21.3% from 25 to 44, 31.0% from 45 to 64, and 24.7% who were 65 years of age or older. The median age was 48 years. For every 100 females, there were 90.2 males. For every 100 females age 18 and over, there were 87.8 males.

The median household income was $48,269 and the median family income was $51,250. Males had a median income of $45,938 compared with $27,938 for females. The per capita income for the CDP was $30,822. None of the families and 1.2% of the population were living below the poverty line, including no under eighteens and 1.8% of those over 64.

== Climate ==
This climatic region has large seasonal temperature differences, with warm to hot (and often humid) summers and cold (sometimes severely cold) winters. According to the Köppen Climate Classification system, Greilickville has a humid continental climate, abbreviated "Dfb" on climate maps.

Climate data for Greilickville, Michigan
Month	Jan	Feb	Mar	Apr	May	Jun	Jul	Aug	Sep	Oct	Nov	Dec	Year
Mean daily maximum °C (°F)	−2.4 (27.7)	−1.3 (29.7)	3.7 (38.7)	11.3 (52.4)	18.3 (64.9)	23.6 (74.5)	25.9 (78.6)	25 (77)	20.9 (69.6)	13.4 (56.2)	6.6 (43.9)	0.4 (32.7)	12.2 (53.9)
Mean daily minimum °C (°F)	−7.8 (17.9)	−7.6 (18.4)	−4.3 (24.3)	1.4 (34.5)	7 (45)	13.0 (55.4)	16.0 (60.8)	15.5 (59.9)	11.6 (52.9)	5.7 (42.2)	1.0 (33.8)	−4.6 (23.7)	4.0 (39.2)
Average precipitation mm (inches)	43 (1.7)	30 (1.2)	38 (1.5)	64 (2.5)	71 (2.8)	64 (2.5)	79 (3.1)	86 (3.4)	94 (3.7)	91 (3.6)	66 (2.6)	51 (2)	780 (30.7)
Source: Weatherbase

== Education ==
Greilickville is served by Traverse City Area Public Schools (TCAPS).

The community is zoned to Traverse City West Senior High School, in nearby Garfield Township. Until 2008, Norris Elementary School, operated by TCAPS, served elementary students in southeast Leelanau County. Today, elementary students in Greilickville are zoned to Willow Hill Elementary School, in Traverse City. The Pathfinder School, a private PreK–8 school, is located within Greilickville.
