= Cleveland Township, Michigan =

- Civil township
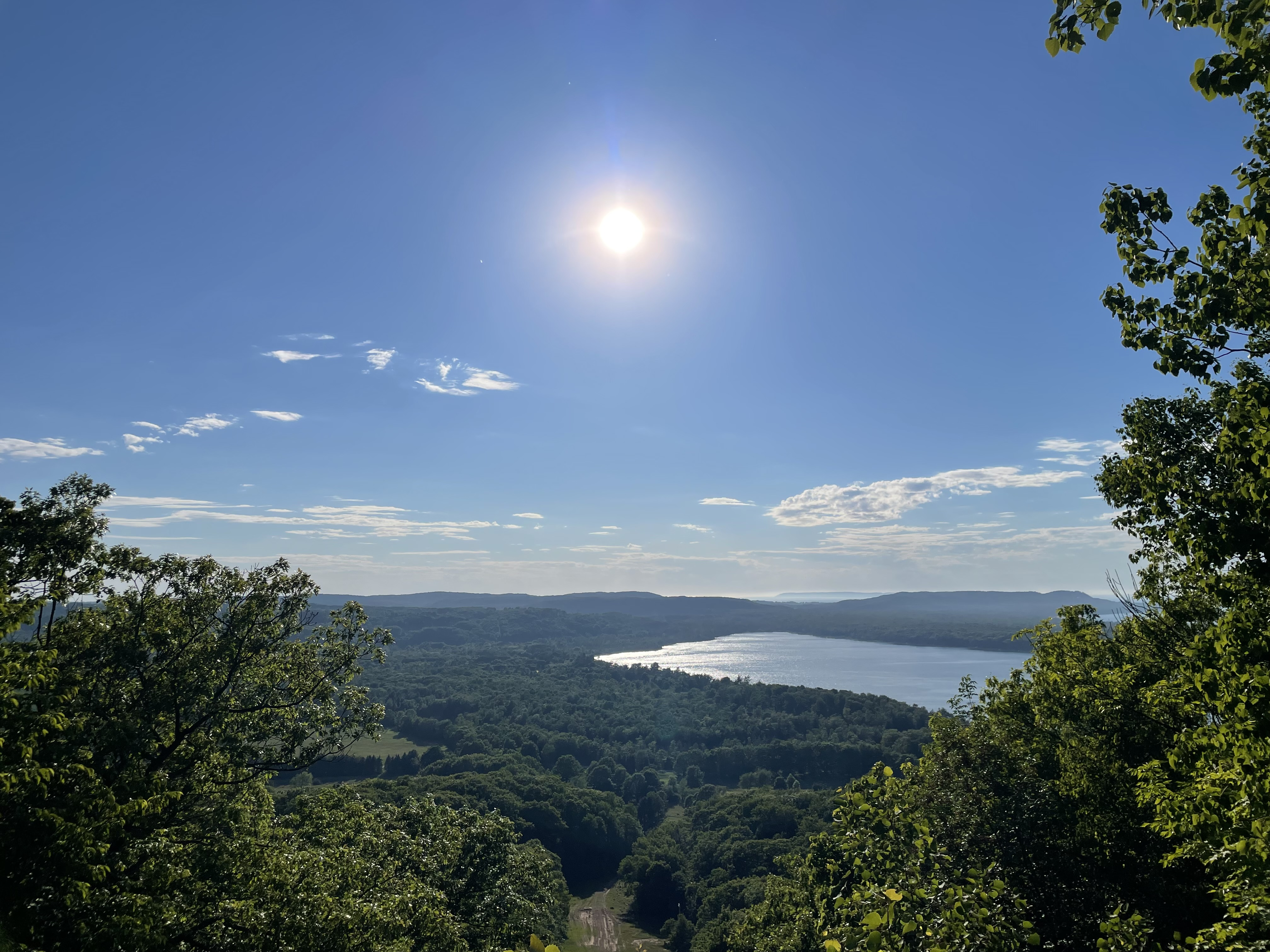
- Little Traverse Lake

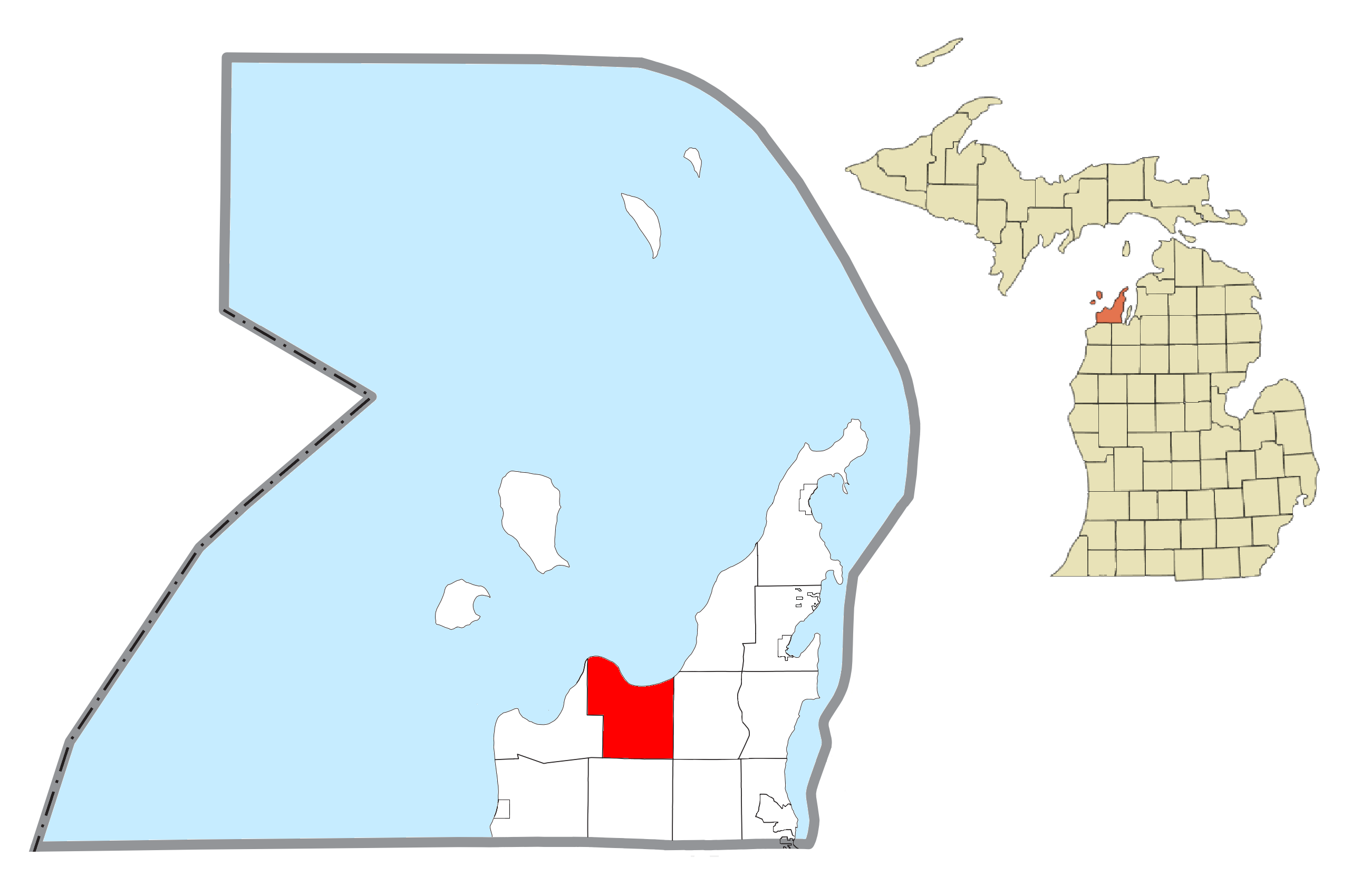
- Location within Leelanau County

- Location within the state of Michigan Cleveland Township (the United States)
- Coordinates: 44°54′08″N 85°51′45″W
- Country: United States
- State: Michigan
- County: Leelanau
- Established: 1871

Government
  - Supervisor: Tim Stein
  - Clerk: Tanelle Budd

Area
  - Total: 70.7 sq mi (183.0 km^{2})
  - Land: 31.0 sq mi (80.2 km^{2})
  - Water: 39.7 sq mi (102.8 km^{2})
- Elevation: 584 ft (178 m)

Population (2020)
  - Total: 1,103
  - Density: 34/sq mi (13/km^{2})
- Time zone: UTC-5 (Eastern (EST))
  - Summer (DST): UTC-4 (EDT)
- ZIP code(s): 49621 (Cedar); 49664 (Maple City)
- Area code: 231
- FIPS code: 26-16400
- GNIS feature ID: 1626097

Cleveland Township is a civil township of Leelanau County in the U.S. state of Michigan. The population of Cleveland Township was 1,103 at the 2020 census. Part of the township is located within Sleeping Bear Dunes National Lakeshore.

== History ==
Cleveland Township was established in 1871.

In 1964, the Sugar Loaf ski resort opened in the east of the township. The resort closed in 2000, and was demolished in 2021. The site of the former resort can be found at 44°54′43.8″N 85°48′58.7″W.

== Geography ==
According to the United States Census Bureau, the township has a total area of 70.7 square miles (183 km^{2}), of which 31.0 square miles (80 km^{2}) is land and 39.7 square miles (103 km^{2}) (56.21%) is water.

Cleveland Township has a shoreline along Good Harbor Bay, a small bay of Lake Michigan.

The township contains Lime Lake and Little Traverse Lake, two medium-sized lakes popular for their recreation.

=== Major highway ===
- M-22 runs west–east through the north of the township, following a winding path that parallels the shore of Lake Michigan.

== Communities ==
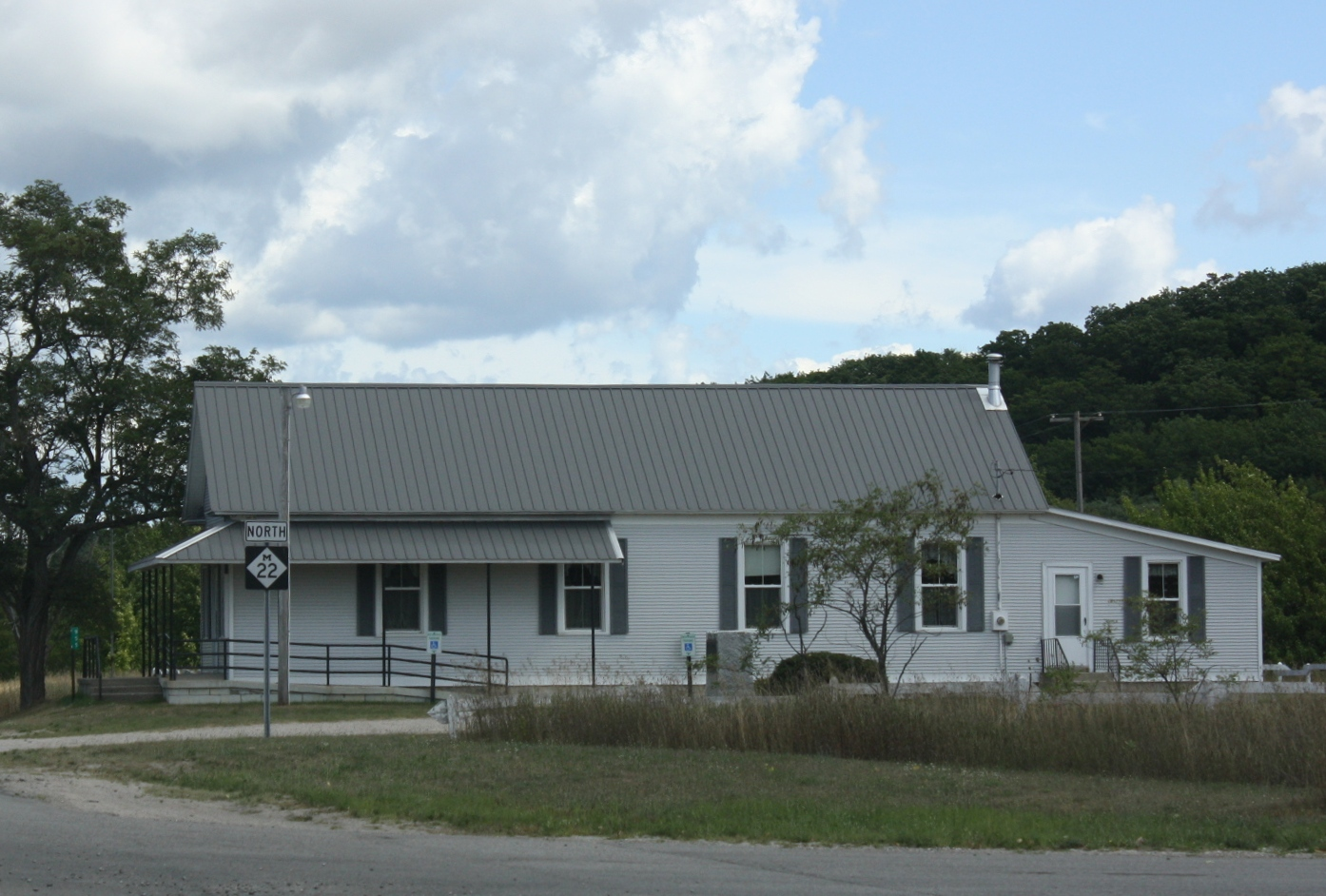
Town hall

- North Unity is a ghost town located at 44°56′49″N 85°53′04″W. North Unity was founded in 1855 by Bohemian immigrants by way of Chicago, on the shore of Lake Michigan. The town burned in 1871, and has been abandoned since.

== Demographics ==
As of the census of 2000, there were 1,040 people, 436 households, and 312 families residing in the township. The population density was 33.6 inhabitants per square mile (13.0/km^{2}). There were 778 housing units at an average density of 25.1 per square mile (9.7/km^{2}). The racial makeup of the township was 97.98% White, 0.19% African American, 0.48% Native American, 0.10% Asian, 0.29% from other races, and 0.96% from two or more races. Hispanic or Latino of any race were 0.48% of the population.

There were 436 households, out of which 26.8% had children under the age of 18 living with them, 63.5% were married couples living together, 4.8% had a female householder with no husband present, and 28.4% were non-families. 24.1% of all households were made up of individuals, and 10.1% had someone living alone who was 65 years of age or older. The average household size was 2.39 and the average family size was 2.82.

In the township the population was spread out, with 23.0% under the age of 18, 4.4% from 18 to 24, 23.8% from 25 to 44, 31.3% from 45 to 64, and 17.5% who were 65 years of age or older. The median age was 44 years. For every 100 females, there were 107.2 males. For every 100 females age 18 and over, there were 103.3 males.

The median income for a household in the township was $45,625, and the median income for a family was $55,000. Males had a median income of $36,518 versus $26,417 for females. The per capita income for the township was $25,796. About 4.4% of families and 6.2% of the population were below the poverty line, including 7.2% of those under age 18 and 7.6% of those age 65 or over.
