= Leelanau County, Michigan =

County in Michigan, United States

- County
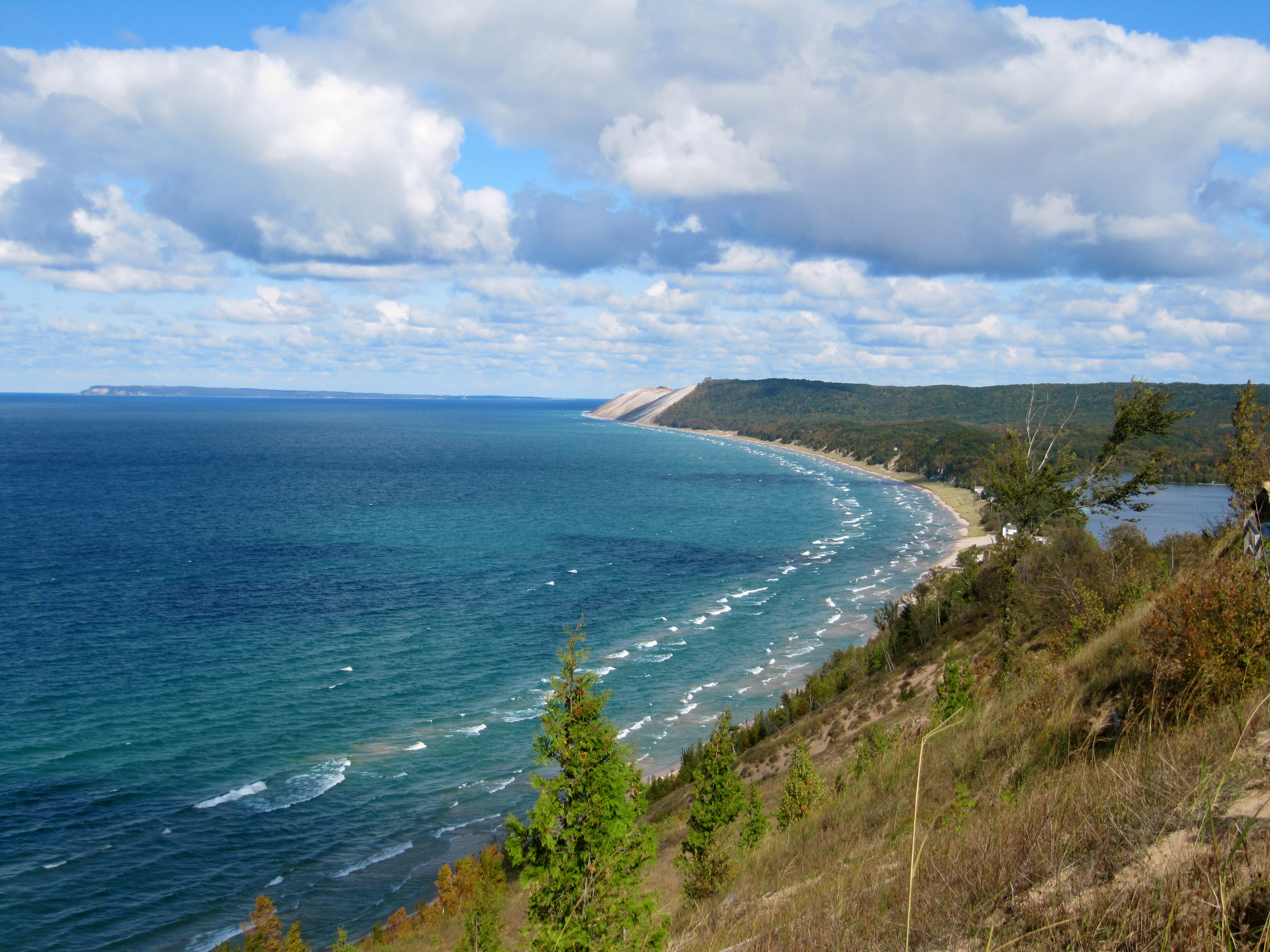
- Sleeping Bear Dunes and South Manitou Island (background) from the Empire Bluffs Trail, near Empire

- Flag Seal
- Nickname: "Michigan's Little Finger"
- Location within the U.S. state of Michigan
- Coordinates: 45°08′N 86°02′W
- Country: United States
- State: Michigan
- Created: 1840
- Organized: 1863
- Named for: Leelanau Peninsula
- Seat: Suttons Bay Township
- Largest settlement: Greilickville; Suttons Bay (incorporated)

Area
  - Total: 2,532 sq mi (6,560 km^{2})
  - Land: 347 sq mi (900 km^{2})
  - Water: 2,185 sq mi (5,660 km^{2}) 86%

Population (2020)
  - Total: 22,301
  - Estimate (2025): 22,982 ▲
  - Density: 63/sq mi (24/km^{2})
- Time zone: UTC−5 (Eastern)
  - Summer (DST): UTC−4 (EDT)
- Congressional district: 1st
- Website: www.leelanau.gov

Leelanau County (/ˈliːlənɔː/ LEE-lə-naw) is a county located in the U.S. state of Michigan. As of the 2020 census, the population was 22,301. Since 2008, the county seat has been located within Suttons Bay Township, one mile east of the unincorporated village of Lake Leelanau. Before 2008, Leelanau County's seat was Leland. Leelanau County is included in the Traverse City metropolitan area of Northern Michigan. The largest settlement in Leelanau County by population is Greilickville, itself a suburb of Traverse City.

Leelanau County is coterminous with the Leelanau Peninsula, a roughly triangular-shaped peninsula that extends about 30 miles (50 km) off Michigan's Lower Peninsula into Lake Michigan. East of Leelanau County is Grand Traverse Bay, a bay of Lake Michigan.

In 2011, the Sleeping Bear Dunes National Lakeshore, located in the county, won the title of "Most Beautiful Place in America" in a poll by morning news show Good Morning America.

== Etymology ==
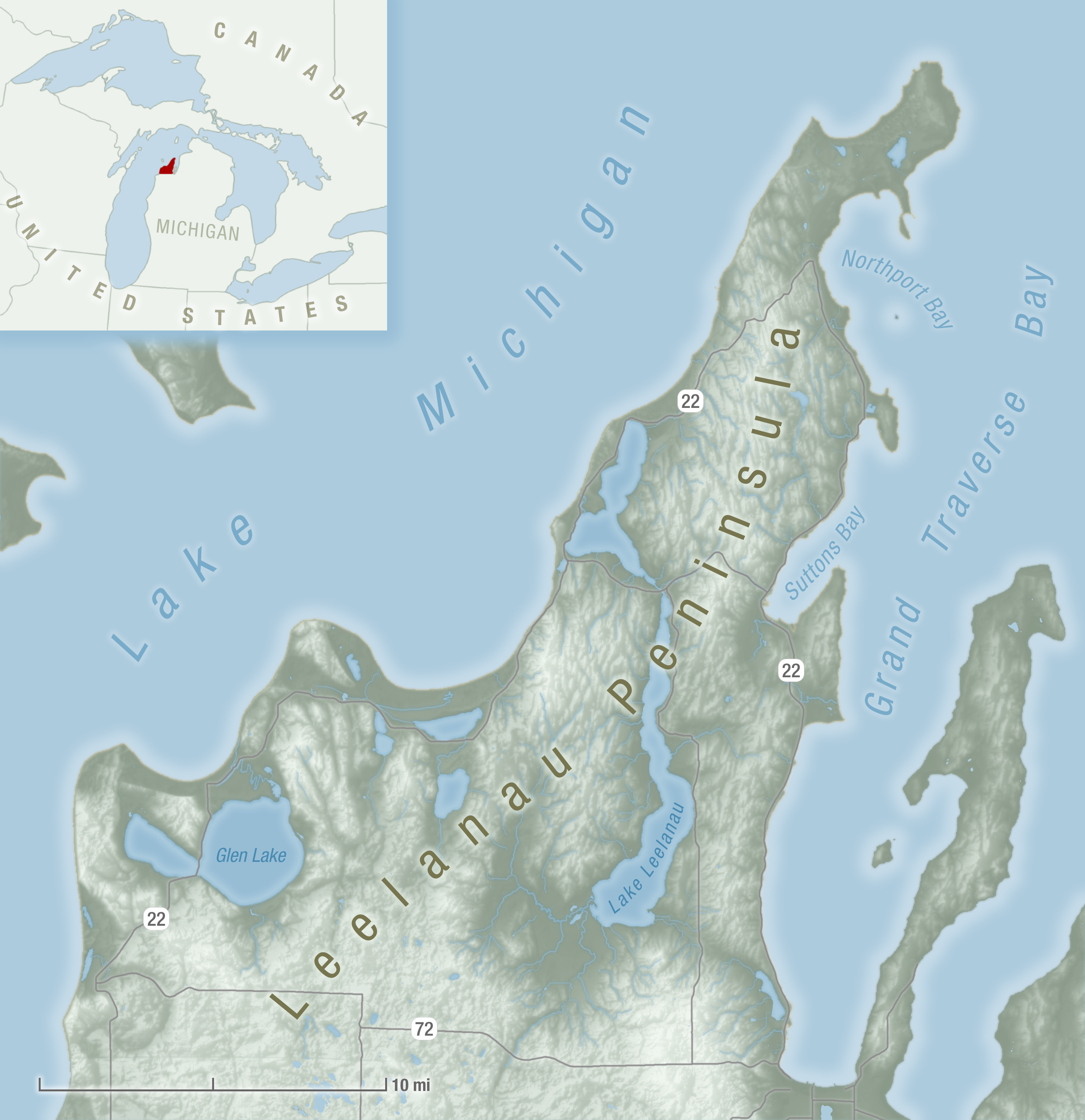
Map of the Leelanau Peninsula

Traditionally, the county's name was said to be a Native American word meaning "delight of life", but it is a neologism from Indian agent and ethnographer Henry Schoolcraft, who sometimes gave the name "Leelinau" to Native American women in his tales. He created many faux Indian place names in Michigan, using syllables of Ojibwe, Latin and Arabic, neglecting the fact that the Ojibwa language lacks any of the phonemes associated with the letter 'L' in English.

More recently, however, scholars have established that Leelinau was first used as a pen name by Henry's wife, Jane Johnston Schoolcraft, in writings for The Literary Voyager, a family magazine which they co-wrote in the 1820s. Jane Johnston was of Ojibwa and Scots-Irish descent, and wrote in Ojibwe and English. While her writing was not published formally in her lifetime (except as Schoolcraft appropriated it under his own name), Jane Johnston Schoolcraft has been recognized as "the first Native American literary writer, the first known Indian woman writer, the first known Indian poet, the first known poet to write poems in a Native American language, and the first known American Indian to write out traditional Indian stories. In 2008 Jane Johnston Schoolcraft was inducted into the Michigan Women's Hall of Fame.

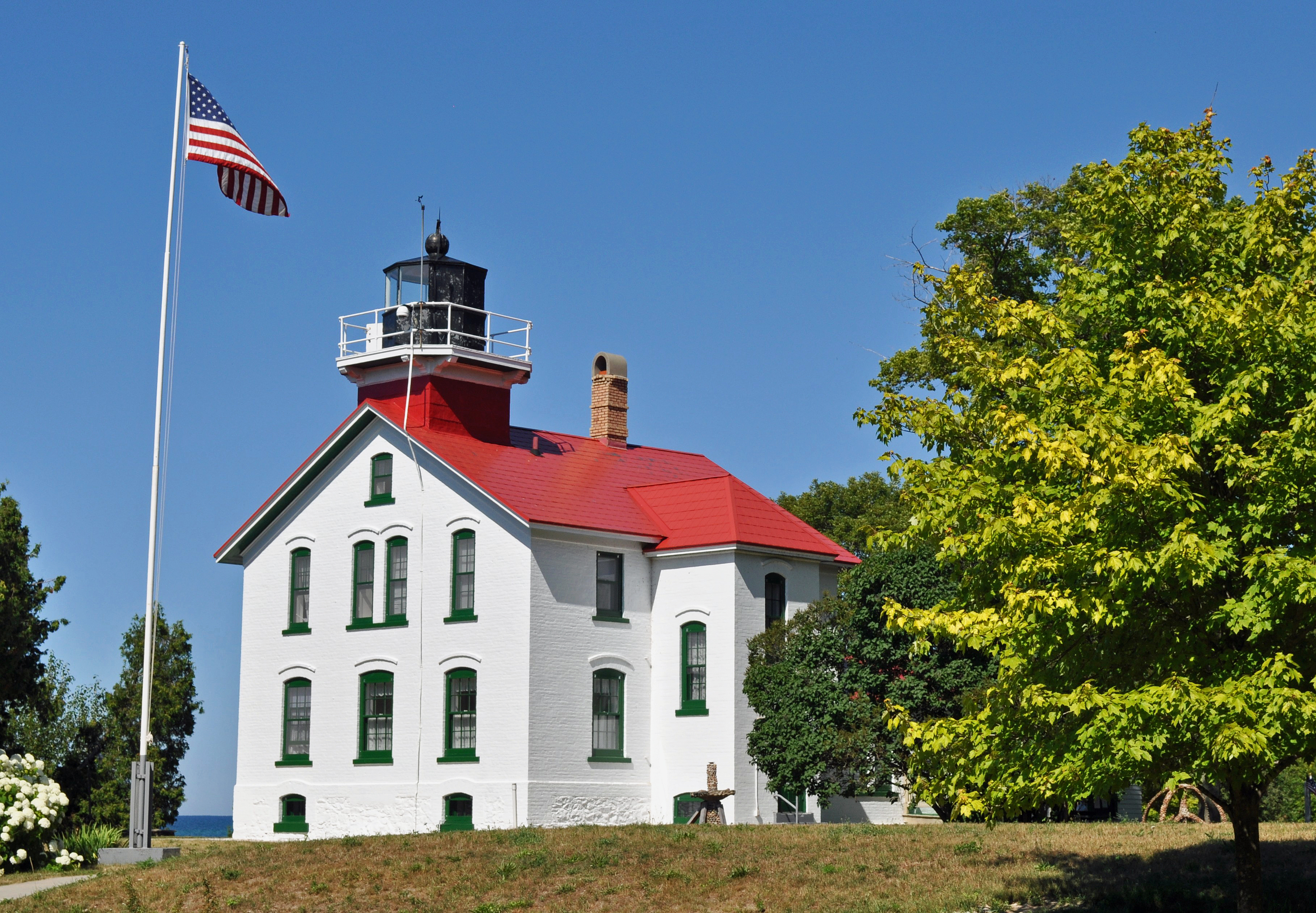
Grand Traverse Light, at the northernmost point of Leelanau County

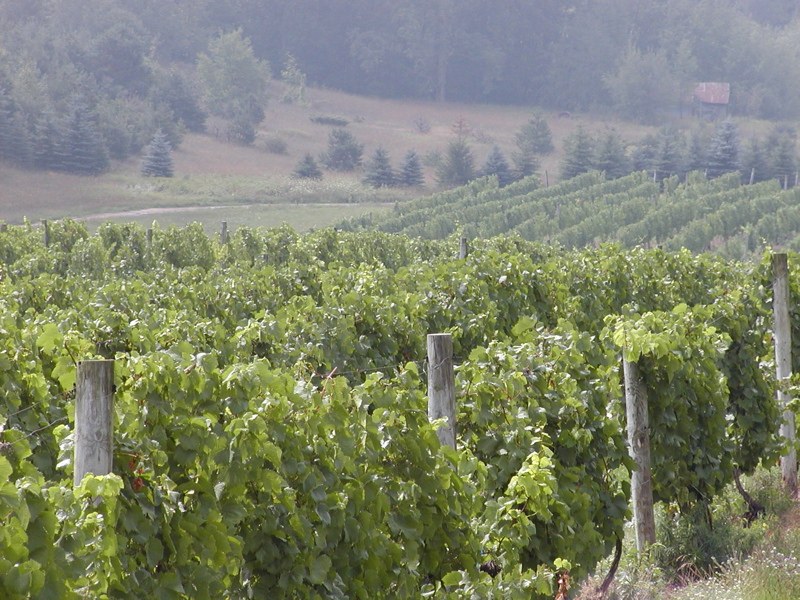
A vineyard in Leelanau County. The county comprises the Leelanau Peninsula American Viticultural Area.

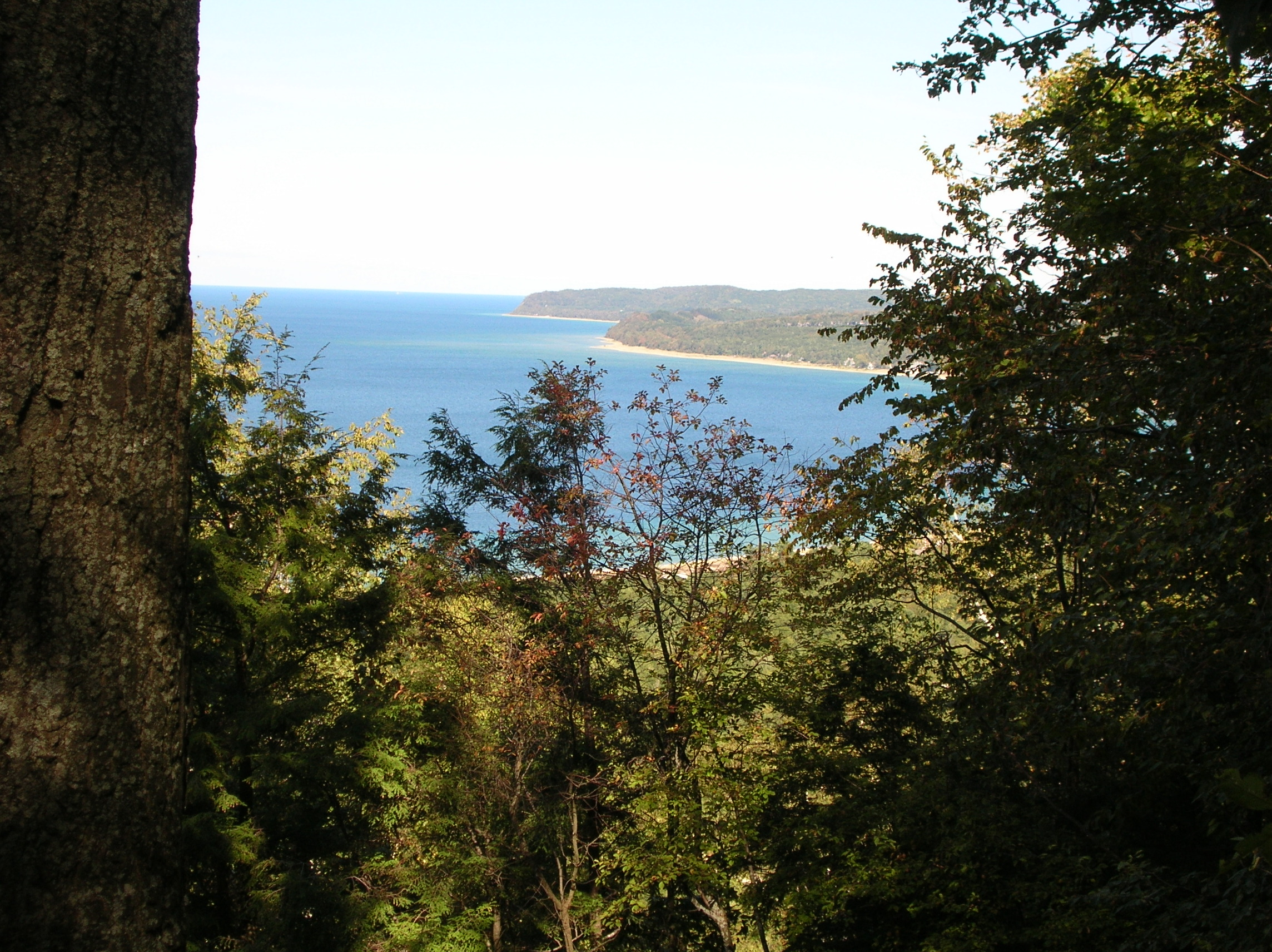
Lake Michigan shore from the Alligator Hill Trail in Glen Arbor Township

== History ==
Leelanau County was separated as an unorganized county in 1840 by the Michigan Legislature. In 1851, it was attached the Grand Traverse County for governmental purposes, and was temporarily given the name "Leelanau Township". In 1863, Leelanau County was organized in its own right. The same year, the southern portion of Leelanau County was separated as Benzie County, and was subsequently attached to Grand Traverse County until 1869.

Sleeping Bear Dunes National Lakeshore was established in 1970, protecting much of the natural scenery of the area at the federal level.

In 2008, the county seat moved from Leland to a site in Suttons Bay Township, near the town of Lake Leelanau.

== Geography ==
According to the U.S. Census Bureau, the county has a total area of 2,532 square miles (6,560 km^{2}), of which 347 square miles (900 km^{2}) is land and 2,185 square miles (5,660 km^{2}) (86%) is water.

Leelanau County comprises the entire Leelanau Peninsula, a roughly triangular peninsula that extends about 30 miles (50 km) from the western side of the Lower Peninsula of Michigan into Lake Michigan. The peninsula forms the western shore of the Grand Traverse Bay. At its base, the peninsula is about 25 miles (40 km) wide. Leelanau County is one of a handful of counties in the United States that is entirely peninsular, a list also including Huron and Keweenaw counties elsewhere in Michigan, nearby Door County in Wisconsin, and San Francisco in California.

The county has the second-highest proportion of water area of any county in the United States, behind only Keweenaw County, Michigan. Lake Leelanau is the county's largest body of inland water, empties into Lake Michigan through the Leland River. Glen Lake, located within the boundaries of Sleeping Bear Dunes National Lakeshore, is considered one of the most beautiful lakes in the world. A substantial portion of Sleeping Bear Dunes National Lakeshore lies within the county's borders, including North Manitou and South Manitou Islands. Leelanau has been party to substantial efforts to protect itself from growth, and to foster a nature conservancy.

Extreme southeastern Leelanau County, specifically portions of Elmwood Township, are urbanized due to their proximity to Traverse City, which itself extends partially into the county. Traverse City is the largest city in Northern Michigan by population.

=== Adjacent counties ===
By land

- Grand Traverse County (southeast)
- Benzie County (southwest)

By water

- Schoolcraft County (north)
- Charlevoix County (northeast)
- Antrim County (east)
- Door County, Wisconsin (west, Central Time Zone border)
- Delta County (northwest)

== Communities ==
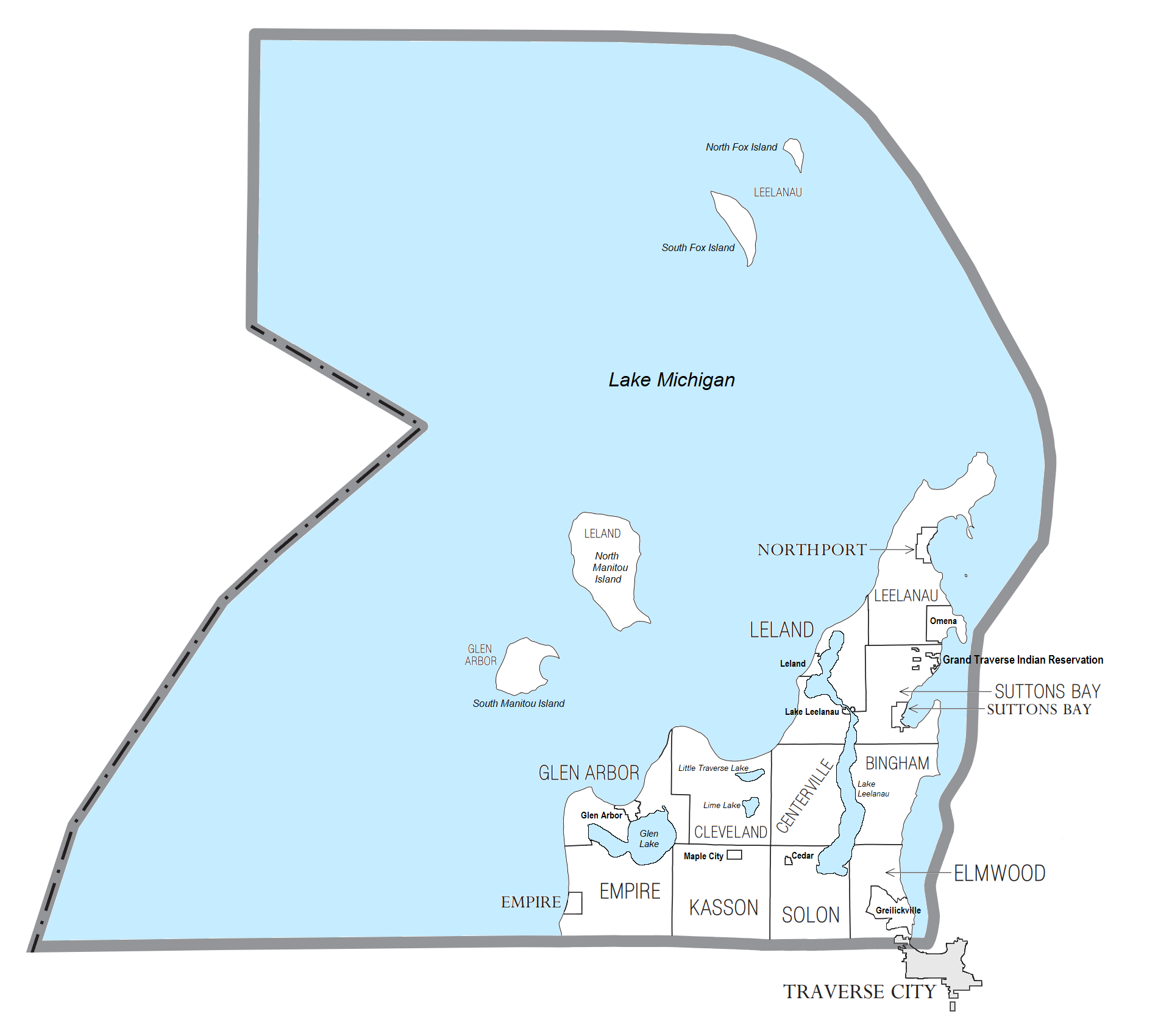
U.S. Census data map showing local municipal boundaries within Leelanau County, as well as CDP boundaries. Shaded areas represent incorporated cities (only a small portion of Traverse City, which is mostly in Grand Traverse County).

=== Cities ===
- Traverse City (partially)

=== Villages ===
- Empire
- Northport
- Suttons Bay

=== Charter township ===
- Elmwood Charter Township

=== Civil townships ===
- Bingham Township
- Centerville Township
- Cleveland Township
- Empire Township
- Glen Arbor Township
- Kasson Township
- Leelanau Township
- Leland Township
- Solon Township
- Suttons Bay Township (county seat)

=== Census-designated places ===
- Cedar
- Glen Arbor
- Greilickville
- Lake Leelanau
- Leland
- Maple City
- Omena

=== Unincorporated communities ===
- Bingham
- Burdickville
- Fouch
- Fountain Point
- Glen Haven
- Isadore
- Keswick
- Northport Point
- Peshawbestown
- Solon

=== Ghost towns ===
- Ahgosatown
- Bodus
- Crescent
- Crystal Spring
- Good Harbor
- Hatchs
- Heimforth
- Jacktown
- Kasson
- North Unity
- Onominese
- Oviatt
- Port Oneida
- Schomberg
- Waukazooville

=== Indian reservation ===
- Grand Traverse Band of Ottawa and Chippewa Indians occupies scattered areas within Suttons Bay Township.

== Demographics ==
Historical population
Census	Pop.	Note	%±
1860	2,158		—
1870	4,576		112.0%
1880	6,253		36.6%
1890	7,944		27.0%
1900	10,556		32.9%
1910	10,608		0.5%
1920	9,061		−14.6%
1930	8,206		−9.4%
1940	8,436		2.8%
1950	8,647		2.5%
1960	9,321		7.8%
1970	10,872		16.6%
1980	14,007		28.8%
1990	16,527		18.0%
2000	21,119		27.8%
2010	21,708		2.8%
2020	22,301		2.7%
2025 (est.)	22,982	▲	3.1%
U.S. Decennial Census; 2010-2018

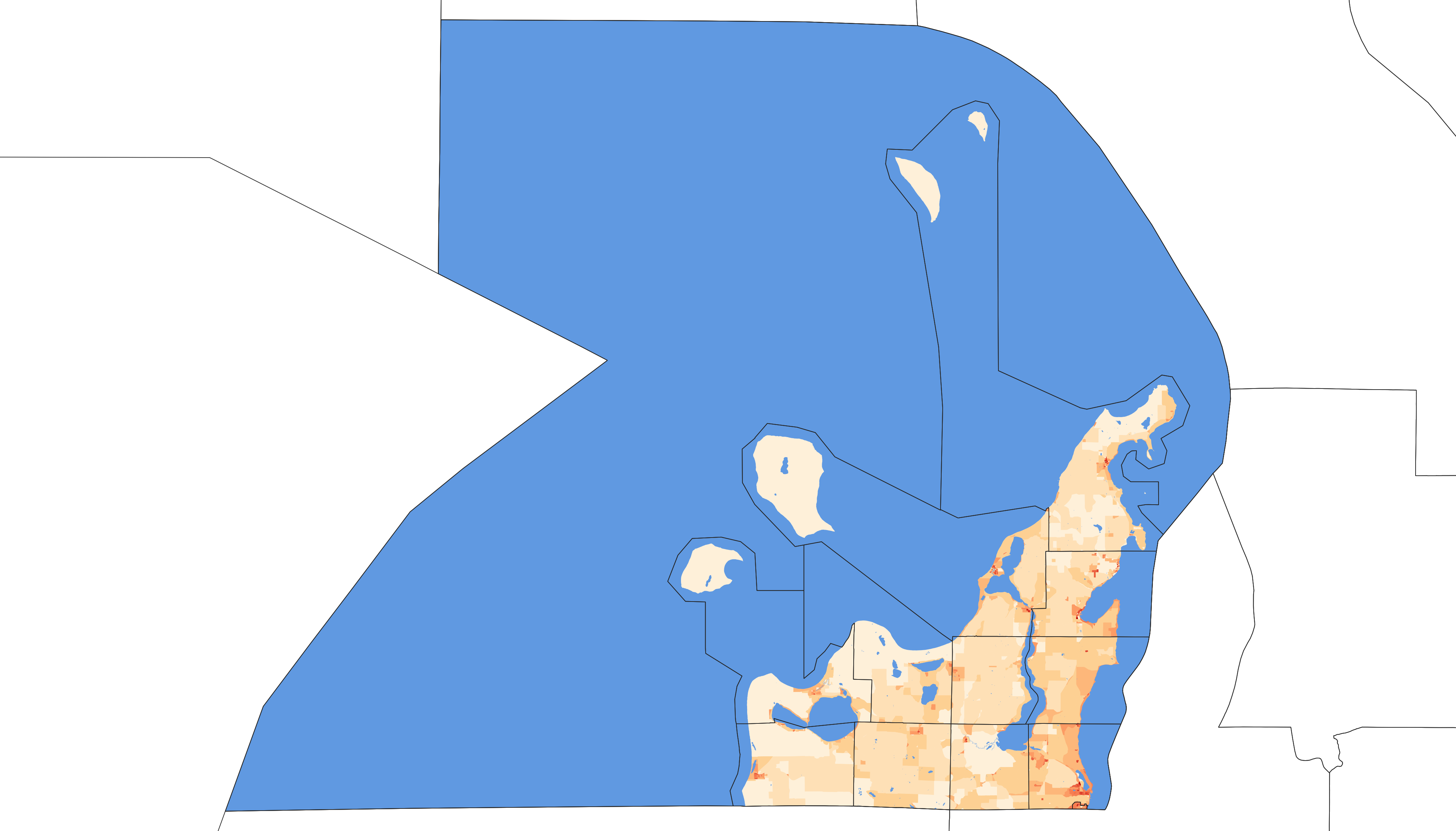
2020 population density of Leelanau County MI by census block

=== Racial and ethnic composition ===
Leelanau County, Michigan – Racial and ethnic composition Note: the US Census treats Hispanic/Latino as an ethnic category. This table excludes Latinos from the racial categories and assigns them to a separate category. Hispanics/Latinos may be of any race.
Race / Ethnicity (NH = Non-Hispanic)	Pop 1980	Pop 1990	Pop 2000	Pop 2010	Pop 2020	% 1980	% 1990	% 2000	% 2010	% 2020
White alone (NH)	13,710	15,836	19,424	19,799	19,781	97.88%	95.82%	91.97%	91.21%	88.70%
Black or African American alone (NH)	18	16	49	56	64	0.13%	0.10%	0.23%	0.26%	0.29%
Native American or Alaska Native alone (NH)	178	445	724	682	577	1.27%	2.69%	3.43%	3.14%	2.59%
Asian alone (NH)	21	39	48	92	106	0.15%	0.24%	0.23%	0.42%	0.48%
Native Hawaiian or Pacific Islander alone (NH)	x	x	4	2	4	x	x	0.02%	0.01%	0.02%
Other race alone (NH)	8	3	6	8	58	0.06%	0.02%	0.03%	0.04%	0.26%
Mixed race or Multiracial (NH)	x	x	170	275	794	x	x	0.80%	1.27%	3.56%
Hispanic or Latino (any race)	72	188	694	794	917	0.51%	1.14%	3.29%	3.66%	4.11%
Total	14,007	16,527	21,119	21,708	22,301	100.00%	100.00%	100.00%	100.00%	100.00%

=== 2020 census ===
As of the 2020 census, the county had a population of 22,301. The median age was 55.1 years; 16.6% of residents were under the age of 18 and 32.3% of residents were 65 years of age or older. For every 100 females there were 96.7 males, and for every 100 females age 18 and over there were 95.8 males age 18 and over.

The racial makeup of the county was 89.9% White, 0.3% Black or African American, 3.0% American Indian and Alaska Native, 0.5% Asian, <0.1% Native Hawaiian and Pacific Islander, 1.4% from some other race, and 4.9% from two or more races. Hispanic or Latino residents of any race comprised 4.1% of the population.

12.4% of residents lived in urban areas, while 87.6% lived in rural areas.

There were 9,728 households in the county, of which 20.1% had children under the age of 18 living in them. Of all households, 58.9% were married-couple households, 15.1% were households with a male householder and no spouse or partner present, and 20.8% were households with a female householder and no spouse or partner present. About 26.4% of all households were made up of individuals and 15.3% had someone living alone who was 65 years of age or older.

There were 15,421 housing units, of which 36.9% were vacant. Among occupied housing units, 87.4% were owner-occupied and 12.6% were renter-occupied. The homeowner vacancy rate was 1.2% and the rental vacancy rate was 14.1%.

=== 2000 census ===
As of the 2000 United States census, there were 21,119 people, 8,436 households, and 6,217 families residing in the county.

== Culture ==
There are 26 wineries on the peninsula. The Leelanau Peninsula sits astride the 45th parallel, a latitude known for growing prestigious grapes. The two Grand Traverse Bays provide the ideal maritime climate, and the rich soil does the rest. Northern Michigan specializes in growing white grapes, and is known for its Rieslings, which grow well in the summer months and late fall. The local wineries host an annual harvest fest in October. Some Riesling grapes are spared being picked in the fall, to be picked instead when they freeze, from which ice wine is made. These wineries are in the Leelanau Peninsula AVA.

== Government ==
=== Elected officials ===
- Prosecuting Attorney – Joseph T. Hubbell
- Probate Judge – Marian Kromkowski
- Sheriff – Michael Borkovich
- County Clerk – Michelle L. Crocker
- County Treasurer – John A. Gallagher
- Register of Deeds – Dorothy M. Miller
- Drain Commissioner – Steven R. Christensen
- Commissioner Dist. 1 – Jamie Kramer
- Commissioner Dist. 2 – James O'Rourke
- Commissioner Dist. 3 – Doug Rexroat
- Commissioner Dist. 4 – Ty Wessell
- Commissioner Dist. 5 – Kama Ross
- Commissioner Dist. 6 – Gwenne Allgaier
- Commissioner Dist. 7 – Melinda Lautner

(information as of September 2018)

== Politics ==
Leelanau County had historically been a Republican stronghold since its founding, but has shifted Democratic in the 2020s. Since 1884, the Republican Party nominee has carried the county vote in 30 of 36 national elections through 2024. In 2016, the county shifted to the left against the state's strong turn to the right. This would continue in 2020 and the county voted for Joe Biden. In 2024, Kamala Harris won the highest percentage of the vote for a Democrat in the county's history since 1964, became the first Democratic presidential nominee to win the county while losing the presidential election, and it was one of the few counties in Michigan to move to the left compared to 2020.

In gubernatorial races, Leelanau County has become a bellwether, backing the statewide winner in every election since 2006. The county voted for Democrat Jennifer Granholm in 2006, Republican Rick Snyder in 2010 and 2014, and Democrat Gretchen Whitmer in 2018 and 2022.

United States presidential election results for Leelanau County, Michigan
Year	Republican		Democratic		Third party(ies)	
Year	No.	%	No.	%	No.	%
1880	594	48.61%	545	44.60%	83	6.79%
1884	811	57.80%	571	40.70%	21	1.50%
1888	899	55.49%	673	41.54%	48	2.96%
1892	769	53.63%	492	34.31%	173	12.06%
1896	1,402	64.25%	690	31.62%	90	4.12%
1900	1,468	68.41%	634	29.54%	44	2.05%
1904	1,464	75.27%	416	21.39%	65	3.34%
1908	1,258	66.35%	566	29.85%	72	3.80%
1912	621	35.42%	344	19.62%	788	44.95%
1916	984	53.89%	763	41.79%	79	4.33%
1920	2,156	82.26%	406	15.49%	59	2.25%
1924	1,792	75.36%	301	12.66%	285	11.98%
1928	1,521	62.41%	903	37.05%	13	0.53%
1932	1,527	46.09%	1,746	52.70%	40	1.21%
1936	1,692	49.69%	1,542	45.29%	171	5.02%
1940	2,405	66.09%	1,223	33.61%	11	0.30%
1944	2,063	68.24%	944	31.23%	16	0.53%
1948	1,928	69.01%	835	29.89%	31	1.11%
1952	2,926	74.38%	999	25.39%	9	0.23%
1956	2,987	69.82%	1,287	30.08%	4	0.09%
1960	2,730	60.05%	1,810	39.82%	6	0.13%
1964	2,074	46.60%	2,369	53.22%	8	0.18%
1968	2,798	60.06%	1,562	33.53%	299	6.42%
1972	3,809	65.82%	1,855	32.05%	123	2.13%
1976	4,240	62.33%	2,437	35.82%	126	1.85%
1980	4,585	57.78%	2,348	29.59%	1,002	12.63%
1984	5,356	67.62%	2,498	31.54%	67	0.85%
1988	5,215	60.51%	3,331	38.65%	73	0.85%
1992	3,993	39.20%	3,445	33.82%	2,749	26.99%
1996	5,155	50.36%	4,019	39.26%	1,063	10.38%
2000	6,840	56.96%	4,635	38.60%	534	4.45%
2004	7,733	55.57%	6,048	43.46%	136	0.98%
2008	6,938	47.97%	7,355	50.85%	171	1.18%
2012	7,483	52.63%	6,576	46.25%	160	1.13%
2016	7,239	48.61%	6,774	45.49%	879	5.90%
2020	7,916	46.84%	8,795	52.04%	189	1.12%
2024	8,035	45.43%	9,406	53.19%	244	1.38%

United States Senate election results for Leelanau County, Michigan1
Year	Republican		Democratic		Third party(ies)	
Year	No.	%	No.	%	No.	%
2024	8,102	46.15%	9,164	52.20%	289	1.65%

Michigan Gubernatorial election results for Leelanau County
Year	Republican		Democratic		Third party(ies)	
Year	No.	%	No.	%	No.	%
2022	6,752	43.63%	8,540	55.19%	182	1.18%

Leelanau County operates the county jail, maintains rural roads, operates the major local courts, records deeds, mortgages, and vital records, administers public health regulations, and participates with the state in the provision of social services. The county board of commissioners controls the budget and has limited authority to make laws or ordinances. In Michigan, most local government functions – police and fire, building and zoning, tax assessment, street maintenance etc. – are the responsibility of individual cities and townships.

== Education ==
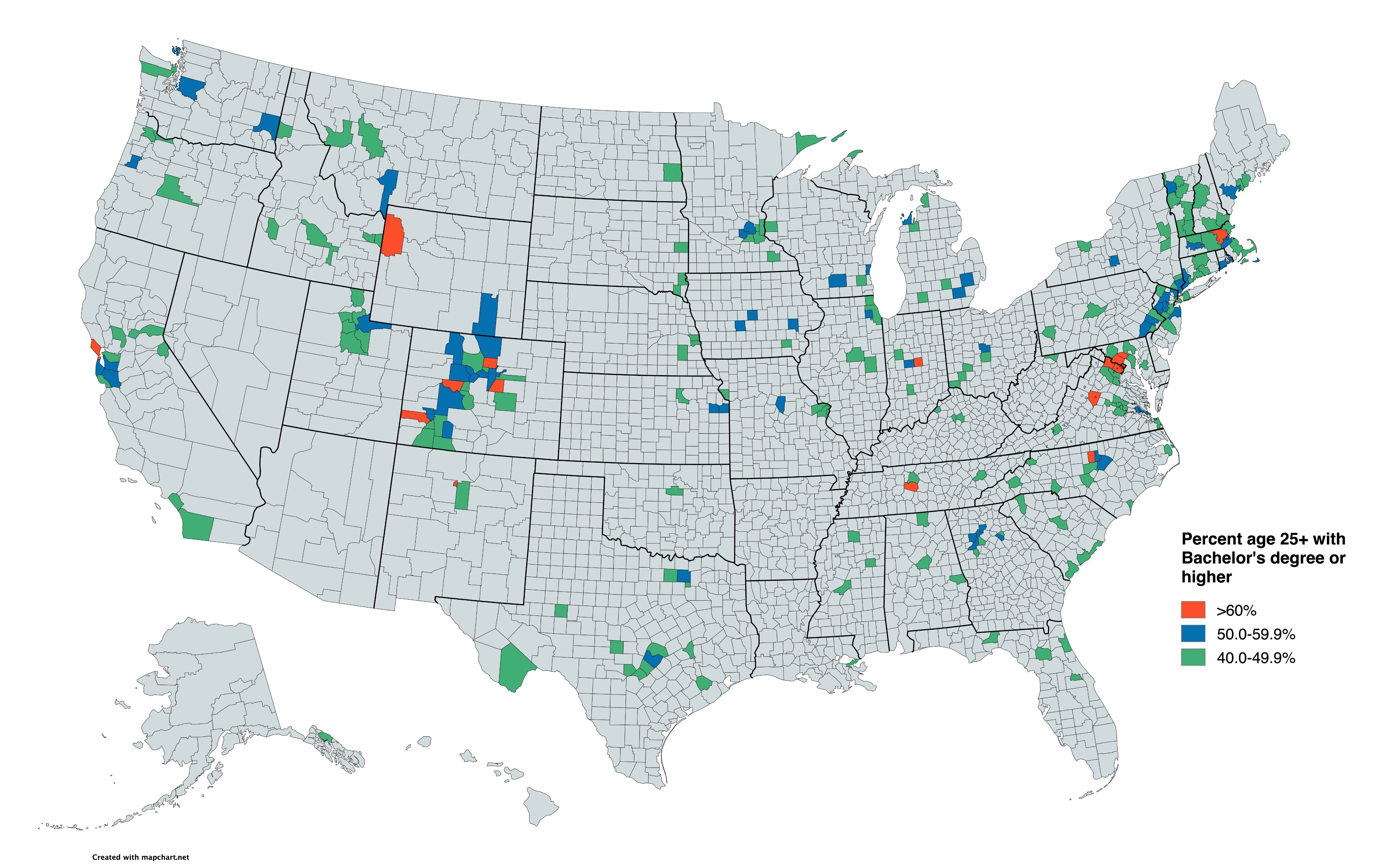
A map of the most college-educated counties in the United States

Leelanau County is one of the most highly educated counties in Michigan. A majority of adult residents over age 25 have Bachelor’s degrees.

The Northwest Educational Services, based in Traverse City, services the students in the county along with those of Antrim, Benzie, Grand Traverse, and Kalkaska. The intermediate school district offers regional special education services, early education and English learner programs, and technical career pathways for students of its districts.

Leelanau County is served by the following regular public school districts:

- Glen Lake Community Schools
- Leland Public School District
- Northport Public School District
- Suttons Bay Public Schools
- Traverse City Area Public Schools

The county also has the following independent charter districts:

- Leelanau Montessori Public School Academy

Leelanau County has the following private schools:

- St. Mary School (Roman Catholic)
- The Leelanau School (nonsectarian, boarding)
- The Pathfinder School (nonsectarian)

== Transportation ==
=== Major highways ===
- M-22 / LMCT is a highway that follows the shoreline of Lake Michigan. The highway enters Leelanau County from the southwest near Empire, and runs northeasterly through the communities of Glen Arbor and Leland before reaching Northport. At Northport, M-22 turns back southward, and runs through Omena, Suttons Bay, and Greilickville before exiting into Traverse City. The highway reaches its terminus at US 31/M-37 about 0.5 miles (0.80 km) southeast of the Leelanau County line.
- M-72 is an east–west highway that follows the base of the Leelanau Peninsula. The highway begins at M-22 in Empire, and continues easterly across the southern tier of the county for about 22 miles (35 km) before reaching M-22 again in Traverse City. The highway continues southeast into Grand Traverse County, and runs across the Lower Peninsula before terminating in Harrisville, on Lake Huron.
- M-109 is a highway in the northwestern part of the county. The highway begins at M-22 north of Empire, and continues north along the west side of Glen Lake. South of Glen Haven, the route turns east, and enters Glen Arbor, where it terminates once more at M-22.
- M-201 is a short highway in the north of the county. The route begins at M-22 south of Northport, and runs north into the village. The highway terminates immediately north of the village, and connects with various county roads that can be used to access Leelanau State Park and the Grand Traverse Light.
- M-204 is a highway that serves as an east–west connector about halfway up the peninsula. The highway begins at M-22 south of Leland, and continues east into the community of Lake Leelanau. The highway passes the Leelanau County Governmental Center before terminating once more at M-22 in Suttons Bay.

Additionally, another highway, M-209, ran from M-109 to the Coast Guard Life Saving Station in Glen Haven. Until it was decommissioned in 1995, it was Michigan's shortest highway.

=== Bicycle route ===
- USBR 35 enters Leelanau County from the southwest, and follows M-22 and M-109 up the west side of the Leelanau Peninsula. The route then turns east along M-204, then south again along M-22 in Suttons Bay. The route then follows the Leelanau Trail south into Grand Traverse County.

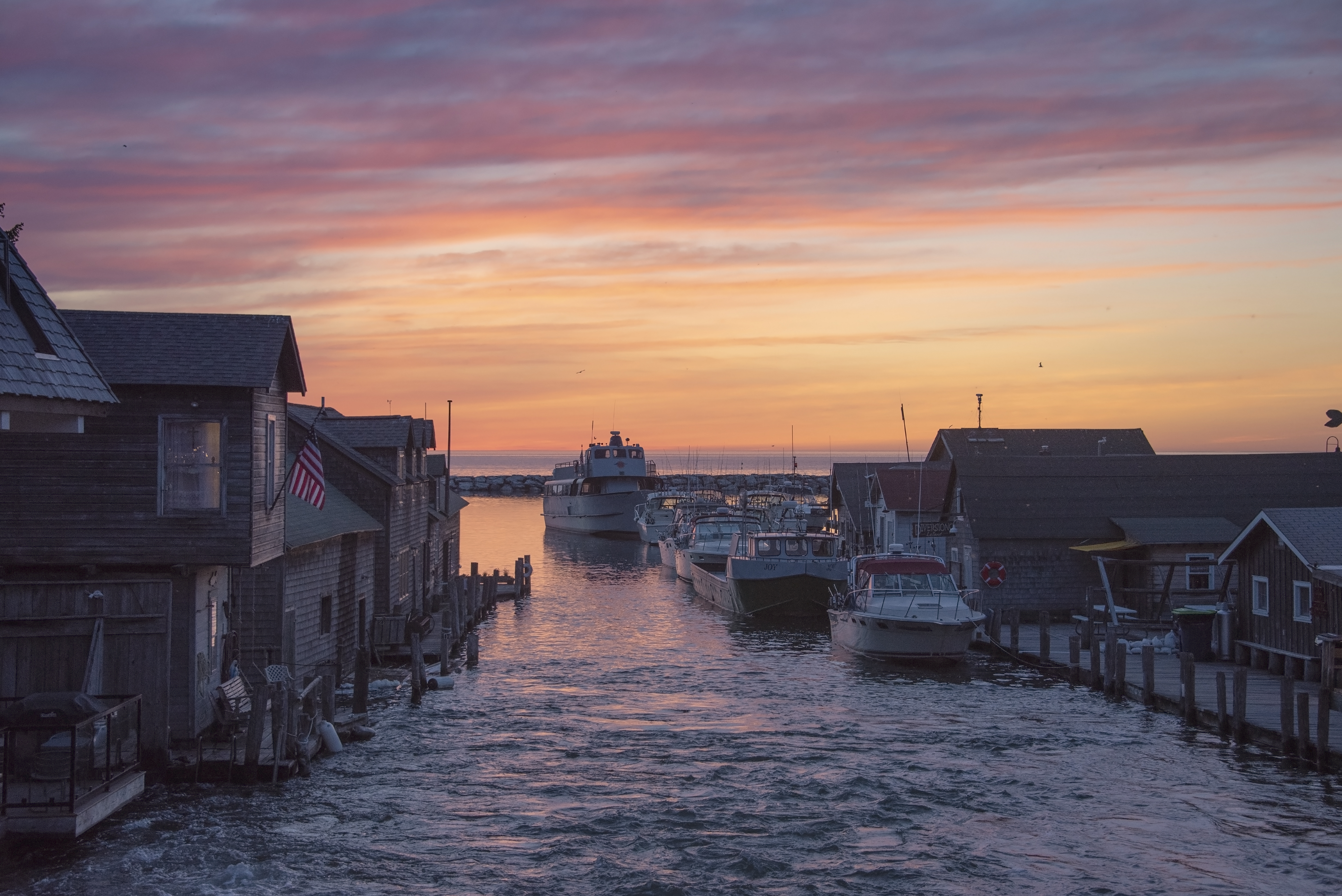
The Leland River flowing through Historic Fishtown

=== Air service ===
The nearest airport with commercial service to Leelanau County is Cherry Capital Airport in Traverse City. Leelanau County is home to a number of local airstrips, including Woolsey Memorial Airport.

== Notable people ==
- Jim Harrison – author, long-time resident of Leland Township
- Kathleen Sebelius – former Secretary of US Health and Human Services and former governor of Kansas; vacations at a summer home built by her grandfather in Leland
- The northernmost village of Northport and surrounding Leelanau Township have achieved fame as an area where the rich and famous can live quietly and anonymously. According to the Leelanau Visitors Guide: "Chef Mario Batali lives north of town at Cathead point, and comedian and actor Tim Allen routinely spent summers in Northport until his divorce. Financier Mark Spitznagel summers in Northport Point, a posh community just outside the village."

== See also ==
- List of Michigan State Historic Sites in Leelanau County
- National Register of Historic Places listings in Leelanau County, Michigan
