= Centerville Township, Michigan =

- Civil township
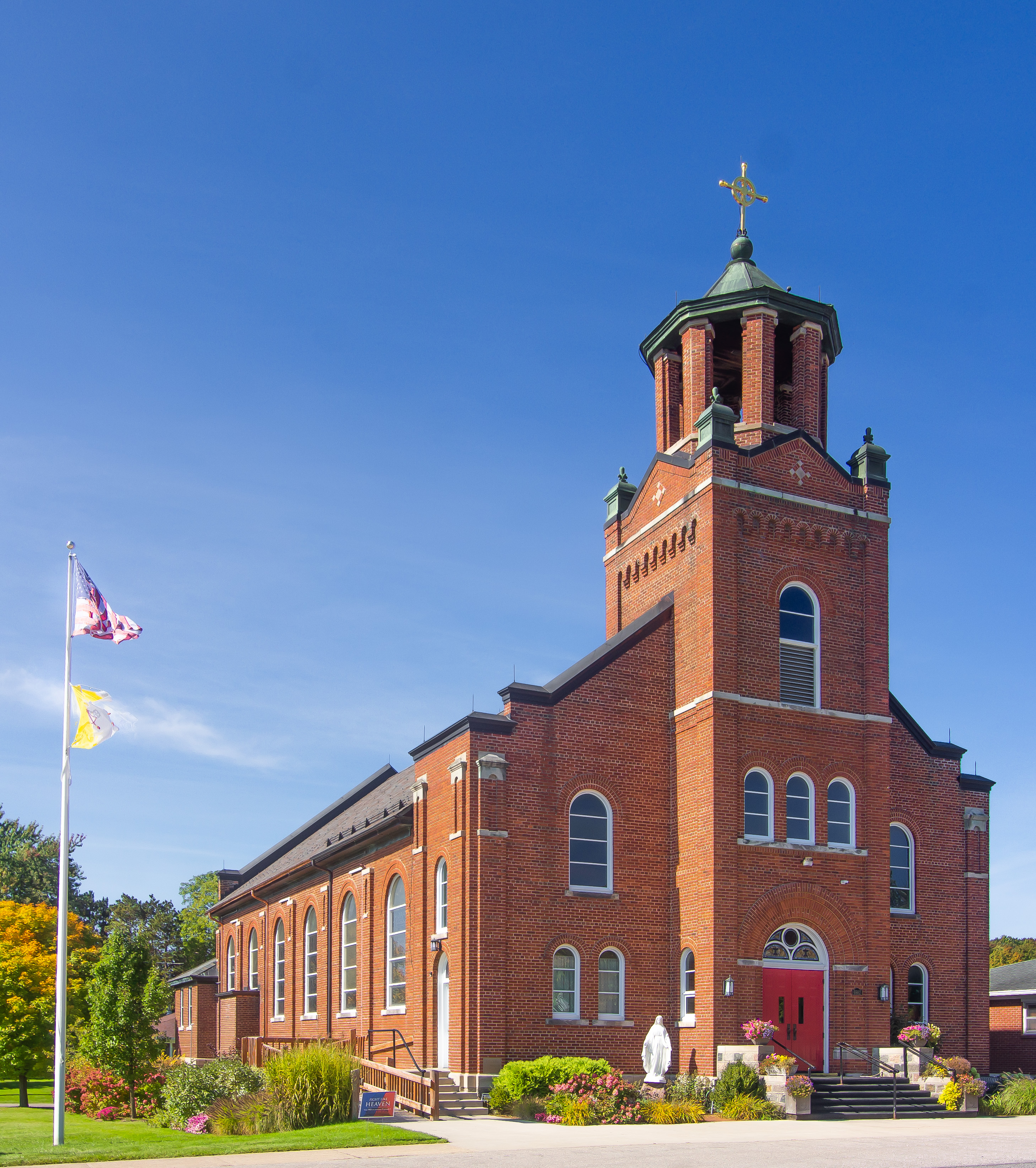
- Holy Rosary Catholic Church in Isadore

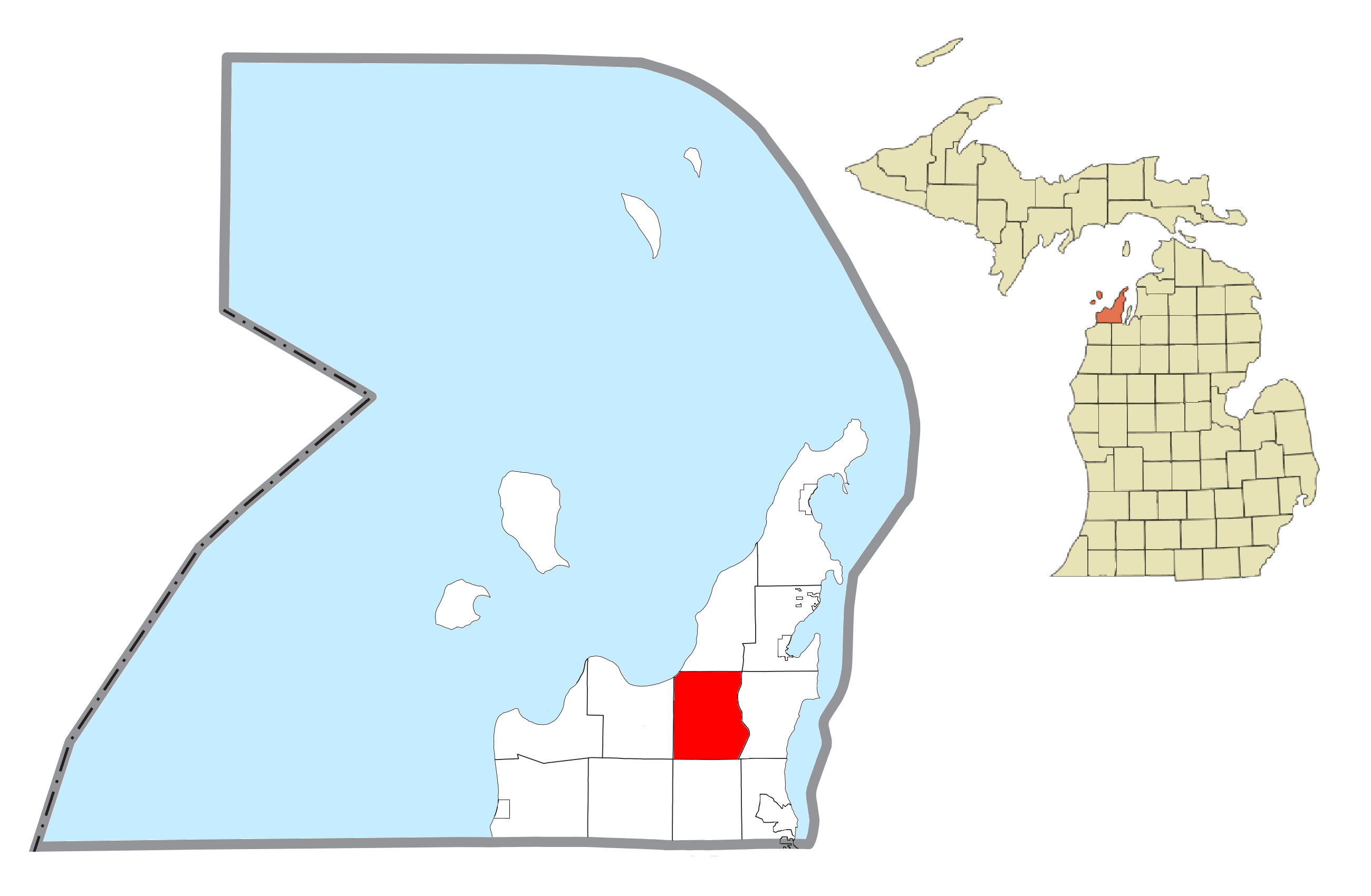
- Location within Leelanau County

- Location within the state of Michigan Centerville Township (the United States)
- Coordinates: 44°54′49″N 85°45′57″W
- Country: United States
- State: Michigan
- County: Leelanau
- Organized: 1862

Area
  - Total: 30.4 sq mi (78.8 km^{2})
  - Land: 27.7 sq mi (71.8 km^{2})
  - Water: 2.7 sq mi (7.0 km^{2})
- Elevation: 820 ft (250 m)

Population (2020)
  - Total: 1,243
  - Density: 39/sq mi (15.2/km^{2})
- Time zone: UTC-5 (Eastern (EST))
  - Summer (DST): UTC-4 (EDT)
- ZIP code(s): 49621 (Cedar); 49653 (Lake Leelanau)
- Area code: 231
- FIPS code: 26-14340
- GNIS feature ID: 1626053

Centerville Township is a civil township of Leelanau County in the U.S. state of Michigan. The population was 1,243 at the 2020 census. The township is bounded to the east by Lake Leelanau.

== History ==
Centerville Township was organized in 1862 as one of Leelanau County's first five townships.

== Communities ==
- Bodus is a ghost town at 44°55′24″N 85°46′57.31″W.
- Good Harbor is a ghost town in the northwest of the township.
- Isadore is an unincorporated community in the southern part of the township at 44°52′40″N 85°46′25″W. It was established when Polish immigrants arrived from Milwaukee, Wisconsin, in about 1870, and settled into farming in the area. The first Roman Catholic Church, called "Holy Rosary", was built in 1883 and a parochial school the following year. Originally called "Four Corners", the name was changed to honor Saint Isadore, the patron saint of farmers. A post office was established on July 27, 1892, and operated until May 15, 1912. A new Catholic school was built in 1905, and the current Holy Rosary Catholic Church, a brick structure, was built in 1922. Later, a high school was added, graduating its first class in 1942. The high school operated until 1961. The intersection today consists of the church, school (closed after 101 years of operation at the close of the 1998–1999 school year), a rectory built in 1966, a cemetery, and a couple of houses, surrounded by farmland on rolling hills. Isadore is also known as the location at which the story "Isadore's Secret" took place. This story centers around the murder of Sister Janina, a nun who served at Holy Rosary church, who was rumored impregnated by Father Edward Podlaszewski.
- Schomberg is a ghost town at 44°55′17″N 85°46′26.31″W.

== Geography ==
According to the United States Census Bureau, the township has a total area of 30.4 square miles (79 km^{2}), of which 27.7 square miles (72 km^{2}) is land and 2.7 square miles (7.0 km^{2}) (8.87%) is water.

Centerville Township contains shorelines on both Lake Michigan and Lake Leelanau.

=== Major highway ===
- M-22 is a north–south state trunkline highway that clips the northwest corner of the township. The highway parallels Lake Michigan, and can be used to access Leland (to the north) and Glen Arbor (to the south).

== Demographics ==
As of the census of 2000, there were 1,095 people, 435 households, and 325 families residing in the township. The population density was 39.5 inhabitants per square mile (15.3/km^{2}). There were 681 housing units at an average density of 24.6 per square mile (9.5/km^{2}). The racial makeup of the township was 97.72% White, 0.46% African American, 0.64% Native American, 0.18% Asian, 0.27% Pacific Islander, 0.55% from other races, and 0.18% from two or more races. Hispanic or Latino of any race were 2.92% of the population.

There were 435 households, out of which 32.0% had children under the age of 18 living with them, 65.7% were married couples living together, 4.6% had a female householder with no husband present, and 25.1% were non-families. 20.9% of all households were made up of individuals, and 7.6% had someone living alone who was 65 years of age or older. The average household size was 2.47 and the average family size was 2.86.

In the township the population was spread out, with 25.3% under the age of 18, 5.8% from 18 to 24, 26.6% from 25 to 44, 24.3% from 45 to 64, and 18.0% who were 65 years of age or older. The median age was 40 years. For every 100 females, there were 108.2 males. For every 100 females age 18 and over, there were 109.2 males.

The median income for a household in the township was $43,214, and the median income for a family was $46,875. Males had a median income of $31,250 versus $23,958 for females. The per capita income for the township was $18,707. About 3.2% of families and 7.0% of the population were below the poverty line, including 8.1% of those under age 18 and 1.0% of those age 65 or over.
