= Cedar, Michigan =

- Census-designated place (CDP) & unincorporated community
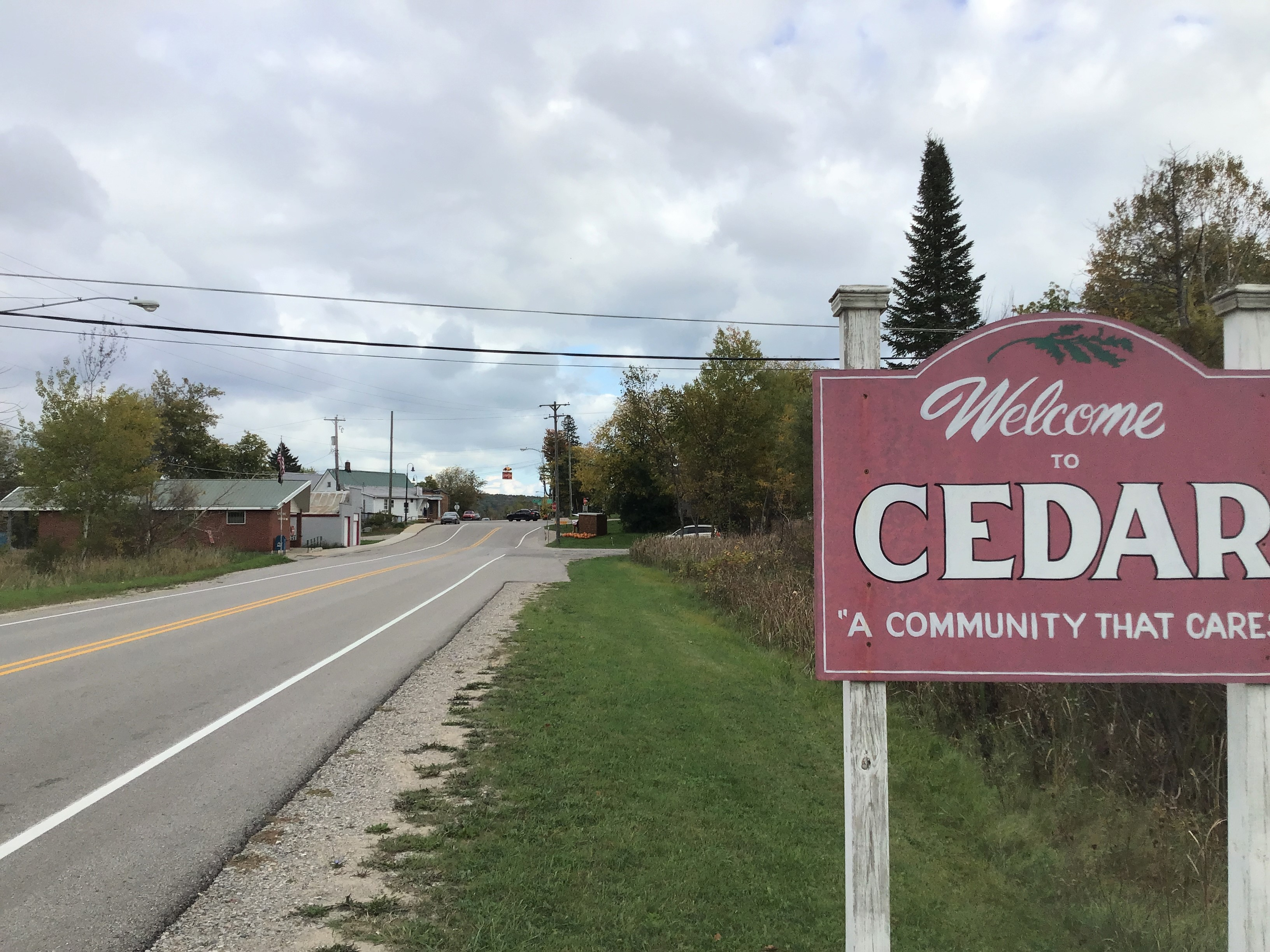
- Cedar welcome sign along East Bellinger Road
- Motto: "A Community That Cares."
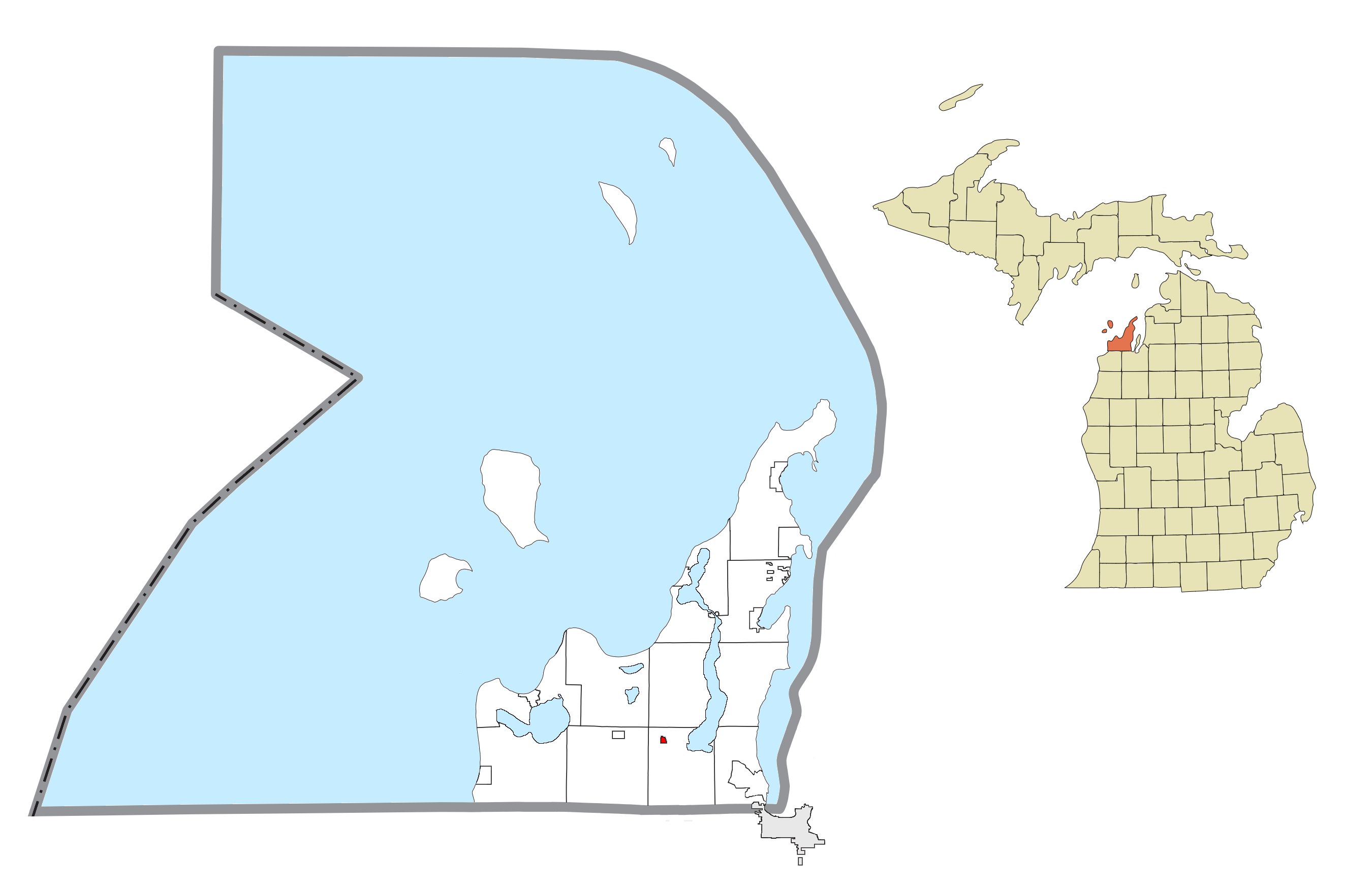
- Location within Leelanau County

- Location within the state of Michigan Location within the United States
- Coordinates: 44°50′52″N 85°47′44″W
- Country: United States
- State: Michigan
- County: Leelanau
- Township: Solon
- Settled: 1885

Area
  - Total: 0.18 sq mi (0.47 km^{2})
  - Land: 0.18 sq mi (0.47 km^{2})
  - Water: 0 sq mi (0.00 km^{2})
- Elevation: 597 ft (182 m)

Population (2020)
  - Total: 102
  - Density: 567.4/sq mi (219.09/km^{2})
- Time zone: UTC-5 (Eastern (EST))
  - Summer (DST): UTC-4 (EDT)
- ZIP code(s): 49621
- Area code: 231
- GNIS feature ID: 622888

Cedar is an unincorporated community and census-designated place in Leelanau County in the U.S. State of Michigan. The CDP had a population of 102 at the 2020 census. Cedar is located within Solon Township, and lies about 10 miles (16 km) northwest of Traverse City. The town is known for its Polish heritage, and is home to an annual polka festival.

As an unincorporated community, Cedar has no legal autonomy of its own. However, it does have its own post office with the 49621 ZIP Code.

== Geography ==
According to the U.S. Census Bureau, the CDP has a total area of 0.18 square miles (0.47 km^{2}), all land. The village of Cedar is intersected by Victoria Creek, which passes under Kasson Street, through the Leelanau Conservancy's Cedar River Preserve, and into South Lake Leelanau.

== Demographics ==
With 95 residents and a typical age of 27.1 in 2020, Cedar, Michigan had a median family income of $43,750. The population of Cedar, Michigan decreased from 106 to 95 between 2019 and 2020, a 10.4% decrease, and its median household income increased from $43,750 to $57,500, a 31.4% increase between 2020 and 2021.

White (Non-Hispanic) (87.4%), White (Hispanic) (12.6%), Black or African American (Non-Hispanic) (0%), Black or African American (Hispanic) (0%), and American Indian & Alaska Native (Non-Hispanic) (0%) make up Cedar, Michigan's top 5 ethnic groupings.

Historical population
Census	Pop.	Note	%±
2010	93		—
2020	102		9.7%
U.S. Decennial Census

== Economy ==
The village of Cedar sports a small number of brick and mortar stores. Notable among these is Bunting's Cedar Market, which is the sole general food-goods store within the community, and has been operating since the mid-1990s. Additional staples within the community include the Cedar Tavern, the Cedar Hardware Store, the Blue Moon Ice Cream Shop, and the Polish Art Center. Beyond the village but within the same zip code, industry is largely agricultural, ranging from cattle-rearing to fruit growing.

== Controversies ==
In 2022, conflict arose as the proprietors (Northgate Resorts) of the Leelanau Pines Campground intended to double the campground's size, construct additional facilities, and increase access and use of Lake Leelanau. Many residents of Cedar and surrounding communities expressed their concerns that these developments will attract more individuals and traffic to the area than is desired, and in turn impede the rural character of the community. This controversy culminated with over 200 people filling the township hall to voice their concerns regarding the development. The planning commission unanimously voted to deny the expansion, but Northgate Resorts responded with a lawsuit towards the township. A settlement was reached which included moderate cutbacks in the development plans for the Leelanau Pines Campground. Concern still exists surrounding Northgate Resorts' intentions regarding increasing lake access through the issuance of more boat slips, but the matter must first be handled by the Michigan Department of Environment, Great Lakes, and Energy (EGLE) before the township can address the question. The issue is ongoing as of January 2024.

== History ==
Cedar was founded in approximately 1885 by lumberman Benjamin Boughey. He named it Cedar City due to its location in a cedar forest. The depot on the Manistee and North-Eastern Railroad continued to be known as Cedar City, long after the post office named simply Cedar was established on August 15, 1893.
