= National Register of Historic Places listings in Leelanau County, Michigan =

Location of Leelanau County in Michigan

This is a list of the National Register of Historic Places listings in Leelanau County, Michigan.

This is intended to be a complete list of the properties and districts on the National Register of Historic Places in Leelanau County, Michigan, United States. The locations of National Register properties and districts for which the latitude and longitude coordinates are included below, may be seen in a map.

There are 24 properties and districts listed on the National Register in the county, including 1 National Historic Landmark.

This National Park Service list is complete through NPS recent listings posted March 13, 2026.

== Listings county-wide ==
	Name on the Register	Image	Date listed	Location	City or town	Description
1	Bingham District No. 5 Schoolhouse	Bingham District No. 5 Schoolhouse	July 31, 1991 (#91000353)	Junction of County Roads 618 and 633; 44°52′33″N 85°40′29″W	Bingham	This building was constructed in 1877 as a replacement for an earlier 1870 log school. It was used for first through eighth grade classes until school district consolidation after World War II. It is now the Bingham Township Hall.
2	Campbell-DeYoung Farm	Campbell-DeYoung Farm	September 8, 2011 (#11000634)	9510 E. Cherry Bend Rd. 44°48′32″N 85°39′18″W	Elmwood Charter Township	This farmstead was first settled by Henry Campbell in 1855, who built the farmhouse in c. 1860. The Campbell constructed most of the buildings. It was owned by Louis DeYoung from 1925 until his death in 2004, and is now operated as a recreational area, the DeYoung Natural Area, by the Leelanau Conservancy.
3	Empire School	Empire School	March 27, 2008 (#08000222)	10017 W. Front St. 44°48′39″N 86°03′32″W	Empire	The Empire School was constructed in 1900-01 as a four-room schoolhouse. A gymnasium was added in 1932, and the school served the community until 1968.
4	Fishtown Historic District	Fishtown Historic District	January 11, 2022 (#100006765)	Roughly bounded by West River St., West Cedar St., and West Avenue A 45°01′24″N 85°45′42″W	Leland Township	Fishtown is a separately listed district contained within the Leland Historic District.
5	Fountain Point	Fountain Point	July 10, 2003 (#03000623)	990 South Lake Leelanau Dr. 44°58′02″N 85°42′22″W	Suttons Bay Township	The name "Fountain Point" is derived from a fountain of sparkling artesian spring water, which has been continuously gushing since 1867. In 1889, Lydia Morrison of Cincinnati, Ohio. established "The Fountain Point House," a Victorian-style mansion, and guests began arriving for the summer by steamboat and buggy.
6	Glen Haven Village Historic District	Glen Haven Village Historic District	June 24, 1983 (#83000882)	M-209; 44°53′40″N 86°02′05″W	Glen Arbor Township	Glenn Haven is a restored logging village on the shore of Lake Michigan. Attractions include the restored General Store and Blacksmith Shop and the former Glen Haven Canning Co. building.
7	Grand Traverse Light Station	Grand Traverse Light Station	July 19, 1984 (#84001799)	Leelanau Peninsula; 45°12′38″N 85°32′58″W	Northport	The Grand Traverse Light was built in 1858, replacing a separate round tower built in 1852. The lighthouse is located inside Leelanau State Park.
8	Grove Hill New Mission Church	Grove Hill New Mission Church	June 29, 1972 (#72000631)	On M-22; 45°03′27″N 85°35′10″W	Omena	In 1852, Reverend Peter Dougherty moved his mission from what is now called Old Mission, Michigan to this location. He built a school, and, in 1858, this mission. Since 1925, it has been used primarily in the summer months, and is still open as the Omena Presbyterian Church.
9	Hutzler's Barn	Hutzler's Barn	January 3, 1978 (#78000375)	West of Leland on South Manitou Island; 45°02′16″N 86°06′52″W	Glen Arbor Township	This barn was built in the 1870s by George Johann Hutzler, a German immigrant who staked his claim on South Manitou Island in 1863.
10	George Conrad Hutzler Farm	George Conrad Hutzler Farm	May 3, 1991 (#91000466)	South Manitou Island, Sleeping Bear Dunes National Seashore; 45°01′22″N 86°07′36″W	Glen Arbor Township	The George Conrad Hutzler Farm was established in 1870. George Conrad Hutzler Jr, the son of the original owner, was notable as an experimental former who was the first to experiment with hybridization of Rosen rye and Michelite pea beans.
11	Lake Leelanau Narrows Bridge	Lake Leelanau Narrows Bridge	January 27, 2000 (#99001732)	M-204 over Lake Leelanau Narrows; 44°58′53″N 85°42′42″W	Leland Township	This bridge, constructed in 1939, is the third bridge to cross this narrow section of Lake Leelanau. The bridge project was part of the Federal Emergency Administration of Public Works, which provided jobs in the Great Depression through funding public infrastructure projects.
12	Leelanau Transit Company Suttons Bay Depot	Leelanau Transit Company Suttons Bay Depot	August 21, 1997 (#97000929)	101 S. Cedar St. 44°58′26″N 85°39′03″W	Suttons Bay	The railroad track through Suttons Bay in 1903 to access a Northport-Manistique car ferry. However, the railway was immediately unsuccessful and the ferry was discontinued by 1908. In 1919, a successor company, the Leelanau Transit Company was organized to take over ownership of the tracks. They leased built this depot in Suttons Bay as a passenger and freight station.
13	Leland Historic District	Leland Historic District	November 20, 1975 (#75000951)	Roughly bounded by the park, Main St., Ave. A, and the harbor 45°01′24″N 85°45′40″W	Leland Township	This district, containing the separately listed Fishtown, contains Leland's harbor and the surrounding downtown area. The harbor contains fishing shanties, smokehouses, and docks established for the commercial fishing industry – some are still used for fishing, while others support the local tourism industry.
14	William and Margaret McFarland Core Farm	William and Margaret McFarland Core Farm	February 2, 2005 (#04001579)	5946 S. Center Hwy;5856 S. Lake Leelanau Dr. 44°53′40″N 85°41′02″W	Bingham Township	This farm, established in 1865, was operated by William Core and his descendants for nearly 150 years. It is currently operated as the Ruby Ellen Farm, a working farm open to the public.
15	Morgan-Copp-Mervau Building	Morgan-Copp-Mervau Building	March 15, 2000 (#00000219)	101 N. Mill St. 45°07′47″N 85°36′57″W	Northport	This building was built in three sections. The first, a single-story building fronting on Nagonaba, was constructed in 1880 as a grocery and dry goods store. An attached two-story section was built on the rear in 1881–83 as a home. The two-story section was extended to front onto Mill Street some time before 1905 and converted into a drugstore. A third section, built diagonally to front onto the Nagonaba/Mill intersection and featuring cedar stickwork, was built in 1927/28.
16	North Manitou Island Lifesaving Station	North Manitou Island Lifesaving Station	August 5, 1998 (#98001191)	East Coast, North Manitou Island; 45°07′16″N 85°58′39″W	Leland Township	The North Manitou Island Lifesaving Station, also known as the North Manitou Coast Guard Station, is the only remaining station which was in use during all three periods of lifesaving service history, from the early volunteer period through operation by the United States Life-Saving Service and the United States Coast Guard.
17	North Manitou Shoal Light Station	North Manitou Shoal Light Station	September 6, 2005 (#05000981)	Northeastern Lake Michigan, approximately 3 mi (4.8 km) southeast of North Manitou Island; 45°01′12″N 85°57′24″W	Leland Township	The North Manitou Shoal Light Station was constructed to replace a lightship station in 1935. When it was automated in 1980, it was the last manned offshore light in the Great Lakes.
18	Omena Historic District	Omena Historic District	January 17, 2017 (#100000534)	Generally along M-22 from Tatch Road to North Omena Point Road; 45°03′22″N 85°35′14″W	Omena	
19	Port Oneida Rural Historic District	Port Oneida Rural Historic District	June 27, 1997 (#97000563)	Roughly bounded by Lake Michigan, Shell Lake, Bass Lake, and Tucker Lake; 44°56′14″N 85°56′11″W	Cleveland and Glen Arbor Townships	The Port Oneida Rural Historic District consists of a set of farms that are typical of Northern European settlers throughout the Midwestern United States in the later part of the 19th century. The district is part of the Sleeping Bear Dunes National Lakeshore.
20	Riverside Inn	Riverside Inn	May 8, 2003 (#03000386)	302 E. River St. 45°01′20″N 85°45′29″W	Leland Township	The first Riverside Inn was constructed in 1902 by Jacob Schwarz, who passed it to his daughters Blanche and Anna after his death. When the inn burned in 1924, Blanche and Anna reconstructed a nearby dancehall to make the current structure. The Riverside Inn is still in business, under owners Barb and Kate Vilter.
21	Saint Joseph's Catholic Church	Saint Joseph's Catholic Church	January 22, 1992 (#91001997)	5899 County Road 669; 44°53′40″N 85°53′00″W	Cleveland Township	Saint Joseph's Catholic Church was built in 1884 by Bohemian immigrants. The church was used by the Catholic congregation until 1970, when the Saint Joseph parish was merged with a neighboring one.
22	Sleeping Bear Inn	Sleeping Bear Inn	September 6, 1979 (#79000284)	M-209; 44°54′15″N 86°01′38″W	Glen Arbor Township	This inn, originally called the "Sleeping Bear House," was built in 1857 by C.C. McCarthy. It operated as a boarding house and hotel through the rest of the 19th century, and well into the 20th. It eventually closed in 1973, and was purchased, along with the remainder of Glen Haven, by the National Park Service.
23	Sleeping Bear Point Life Saving Station	Sleeping Bear Point Life Saving Station	April 26, 1979 (#79000285)	North of Glen Haven; 44°54′31″N 86°02′01″W	Glen Arbor Township	The Sleeping Bear Point Lifesaving Station is significant as a nearly intact version of what was, when built in 1901, a prototype architectural design. It is now a Maritime Museum and part of the Sleeping Bear Dunes National Lakeshore.
24	South Fox Island Light Station	South Fox Island Light Station	August 26, 2021 (#100006861)	South Fox Island; 45°22′43″N 85°50′14″W	Leelanau Township	
25	South Manitou Island Lighthouse Complex and Life Saving Station Historical District	South Manitou Island Lighthouse Complex and Life Saving Station Historical District	October 28, 1983 (#83003782)	Sandy Point; 45°00′34″N 86°05′35″W	Glen Arbor Township	This lighthouse, built in 1872, is the third built on the island, after earlier lighthouses constructed in 1840 and 1858 were deemed structurally deficient. The lighthouse was decommissioned in 1958, and is presently a museum.

== See also ==
- List of Michigan State Historic Sites in Leelanau County, Michigan
- List of National Historic Landmarks in Michigan
- National Register of Historic Places listings in Michigan
- Listings in neighboring counties: Benzie, Grand Traverse
