= National Register of Historic Places listings in Sleeping Bear Dunes National Lakeshore =

This is a list of the National Register of Historic Places listings in Sleeping Bear Dunes National Lakeshore.

This is intended to be a complete list of the properties and districts on the National Register of Historic Places in Sleeping Bear Dunes National Lakeshore, Michigan, United States. The locations of National Register properties and districts for which the latitude and longitude coordinates are included below, may be seen in a Google map.

There are eight properties and districts listed on the National Register in the park, one of which is a National Historic Landmark..

This National Park Service list is complete through NPS recent listings posted June 20, 2025.

== Current listings ==
	Name on the Register	Image	Date listed	Location	City or town	Description
1	Glen Haven Village Historic District	Glen Haven Village Historic District	June 24, 1983 (#83000882)	M-209; 44°53′40″N 86°02′05″W	Glen Arbor Township	
2	Hutzler's Barn	Hutzler's Barn	January 3, 1978 (#78000375)	West of Leland on South Manitou Island; 45°02′16″N 86°06′52″W	Glen Arbor Township	
3	George Conrad Hutzler Farm	George Conrad Hutzler Farm	May 3, 1991 (#91000466)	South Manitou Island, Sleeping Bear Dunes National Seashore; 45°01′22″N 86°07′36″W	Glen Arbor Township	
4	North Manitou Island Lifesaving Station	North Manitou Island Lifesaving Station	August 5, 1998 (#98001191)	East Coast, North Manitou Island; 45°07′16″N 85°58′39″W	Leland Township	Also known as North Manitou Coast Guard Station
5	Platte River Campground	Platte River Campground	April 27, 1990 (#90000605)	Address Restricted	Empire	
6	Port Oneida Rural Historic District	Port Oneida Rural Historic District	June 27, 1997 (#97000563)	Roughly bounded by Lake Michigan, Shell Lake, Bass Lake, and Tucker Lake; 44°56′14″N 85°56′11″W	Cleveland and Glen Arbor Townships	
7	Sleeping Bear Inn	Sleeping Bear Inn	September 6, 1979 (#79000284)	M-209; 44°54′15″N 86°01′38″W	Glen Arbor Township	
8	Sleeping Bear Point Life Saving Station	Sleeping Bear Point Life Saving Station	April 26, 1979 (#79000285)	North of Glen Haven; 44°54′31″N 86°02′01″W	Glen Arbor Township	
9	South Manitou Island Lighthouse Complex and Life Saving Station Historical District	South Manitou Island Lighthouse Complex and Life Saving Station Historical District	October 28, 1983 (#83003782)	Sandy Point; 45°00′34″N 86°05′35″W	Glen Arbor Township	

== See also ==
- National Register of Historic Places listings in Leelanau County, Michigan
- National Register of Historic Places listings in Michigan
