= List of Michigan State Historic Sites in Leelanau County =

Location of Leelanau County in Michigan

The following is a list of Michigan State Historic Sites in Leelanau County, Michigan. Sites marked with a dagger (†) are also listed on the National Register of Historic Places in Leelanau County, Michigan.

== Current listings ==
Name	Image	Location	City	Listing date
Walter T. Best Women's Club House		1125 Main St.	Leland	July 20, 1989
Bingham District No. 5 Schoolhouse†		Southeast corner of Bingham Road (County Road 618) and County Road 633	Bingham Township	October 23, 1987
Charlotte Bushnell House		105 Smith Ave.	Northport	August 29, 1996
Early State Parks Informational Site		Sleeping Bear Dunes National Lakeshore, 4 miles west of Glen Arbor	Glen Arbor vicinity	September 17, 1957
Empire Lumber Company Informational Designation		Village Park, 10484 Niagara Street	Empire	November 7, 1977
Frank E. Fisher Store		5504 SW Manitou Trail (M-22)	Glen Arbor	June 15, 1984
Fountain Point†		990 South Lake Leelanau Drive (County Road 641)	Lake Leelanau vicinity	August 15, 1975
Howard E. Gill Building		206 Rose Street	Northport	July 26, 1978
Glen Arbor Roller Mills		5426 W. Harbor Hwy. (M-22)	Glen Arbor	November 7, 1977
Grand Traverse Light Station†		N point of Leelanau Peninsula, at the end of County Road 629	Northport vicinity	June 21, 1990
Great Lakes Sport Fishery Informational Designation		Village Marina, 105 Rose	Northport	May 8, 1984
Greilickville Informational Designation		129 West Bay Shore Drive	Greilickville	November 27, 1972
Greycote		110 Pearl St.	Leland	July 26, 1974
Grove Hill New Mission Church†		5098 North West Bay Shore	Omena	October 29, 1971
W. K. Hatt Cottage		410 N Main Street	Leland	April 19, 1990
Leelanau County Jail		107 Chandler Street	Leland	July 26, 1974
Leelanau Transit Company Suttons Bay Depot†		101 South Cedar Street	Suttons Bay	September 4, 1997
Leland Historic District†		Roughly bounded by the park, Main Street, Avenue A, and the harbor	Leland	June 28, 1973
Manistee and Northeastern Railroad Cedar Depot		3101 Sullivan	Cedar	August 24, 1984
Provemont General Store		102 Meinrad Street	Leland	June 20, 1991
Saint Wenceslaus Roman Catholic Church and Cemetery		8500 E. Kolarik Rd.	Suttons Bay	July 20, 1989
South Manitou Island Lighthouse Complex and Life Saving Station Historic District†		Sandy Point	South Manitou Island	September 21, 1976
Sunset Lodge		12819 E. Tatch Rd.	Omena	October 23, 1987
Sylvan Inn		6680 W. Western Ave.	Glen Arbor	August 15, 1975
Woodhow Lodge		15311 E. Woodhow Lane	Northport	March 22, 1983

== See also ==
- National Register of Historic Places listings in Leelanau County, Michigan

== Sources ==
- Historic Sites Online – Leelanau County. Michigan State Housing Developmental Authority. Accessed March 13, 2011.
