= George Conrad Hutzler Farm =

- U.S. National Register of Historic Places
- U.S. Historic district
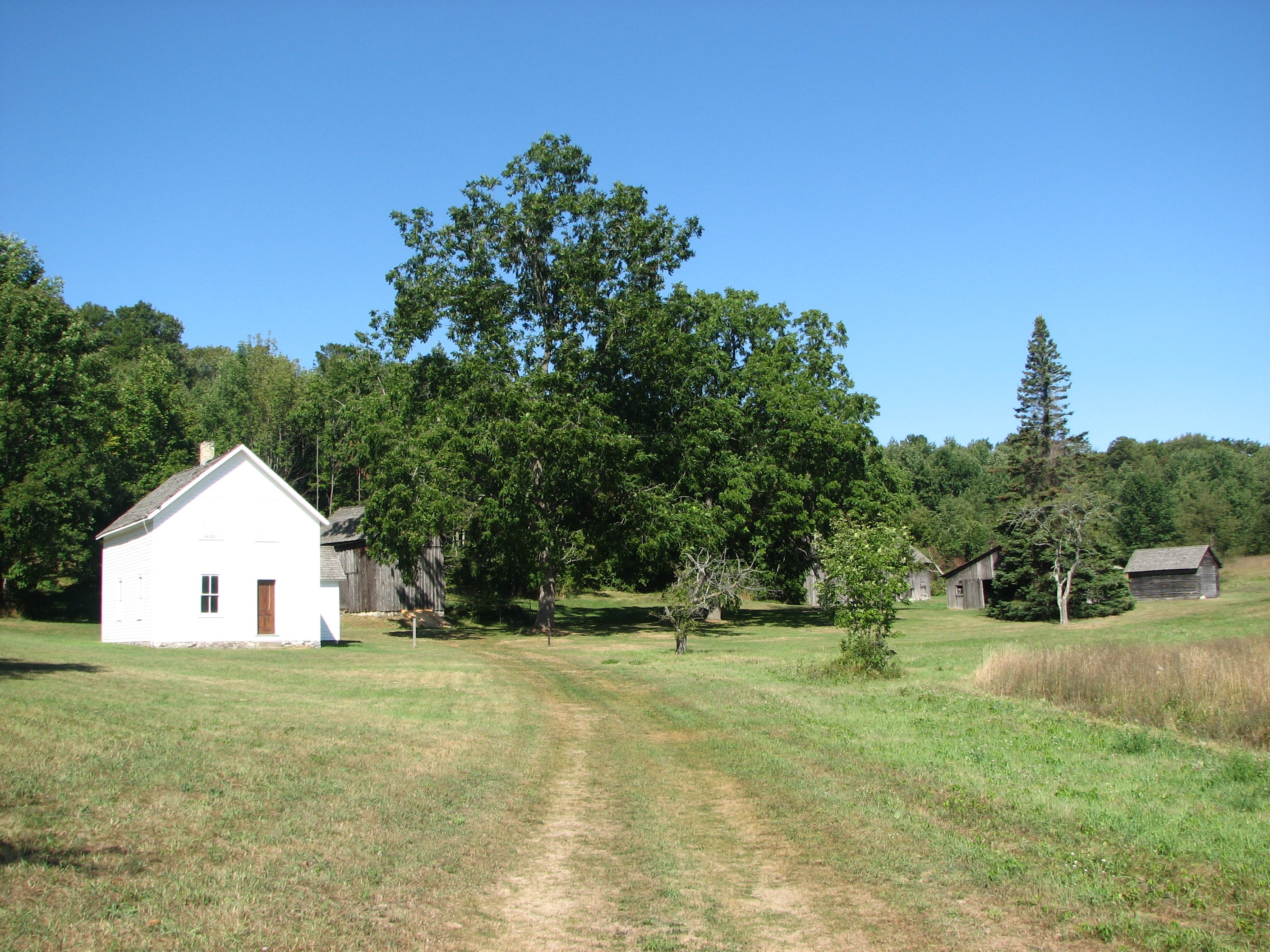

- Location within Michigan Location within the United States
- Interactive map
- Location: South Manitou Island
- Nearest city: Glen Haven, Michigan
- Coordinates: 45°1′22″N 86°7′36″W
- Area: 160 acres (65 ha)
- NRHP reference No.: 91000466
- Added to NRHP: May 3, 1991

The George Conrad Hutzler Farm, also known as the Conrad Hutzler Farm, is a historic farmstead located on South Manitou Island in Lake Michigan. One of the farm's owners, George Conrad Hutzler Jr., was the first to experiment with hybridization of Rosen rye and Michelite pea beans; within 20 years of his experimentation, 80% of the pea bean crop in the United States was descended from Michelite seeds grown on South Manitou Island. It was listed on the National Register of Historic Places in 1991.

== History ==
George Conrad Hutzler was born in about 1822 and lived in the small village of Oberkrumbach near Kirchensittenbach, Bavaria. In 1845, he emigrated for America along with his wife Magdalena and their son. George Conrad Hutzler likely worked as a sailor on the Great Lakes. In 1854 his half-brother George Johann Hutzler arrived from Germany and also settled in Buffalo. George Johann Hutzler and his family later moved to South Manitou Island, likely in 1860, and George Conrad Hutzler followed in about 1868. In 1870, he staked a claim to this farm near his half-brother.

George Conrad Hutzler died in 1896 and was buried on the farm. His son George Conrad Jr.(born on the island in 1872) took over ownership of the farm. George Conrad Jr. and his son Lewis ran the farm for a number of years. In the 1920s, researchers from Michigan Agricultural College (now Michigan State University) chose South Manitou Island to work on experimental hybridization of rye plants, due primarily to its isolation from other rye crops which prevented accidental cross-pollination. The Hutzlers were notable partners in the effort, and won a number of awards for the varieties of Rosen Rye and the Michilite pea bean that they developed.

However, during the Great Depression, transportation on the Great Lakes declined, and South Manitou Island farmers had a more difficult time getting their crops to market; even the experimental farming that many farm families, including the Hutzlers, engaged in could not sustain the farms on the island. As a result, families began leaving in the 1940s. Louis Hutzler eventually married and moved to Hastings, Michigan. George Conrad Hutzler Jr. died on the farm in 1951 and is buried there.

After George Conrad Hutzler Jr.'s death, a development group headed by William Boals purchased the farm from his son. They rented the farm to the Riker family. However, development activities never materialized, and in 1970 Boals sold the property to the National Park Service. The Rikers, by then the last active farm family on the island, were asked to relocate, and the farm (and other properties on South Manitou Island) were included as part of the Sleeping Bear Dunes National Lakeshore.

== Description ==
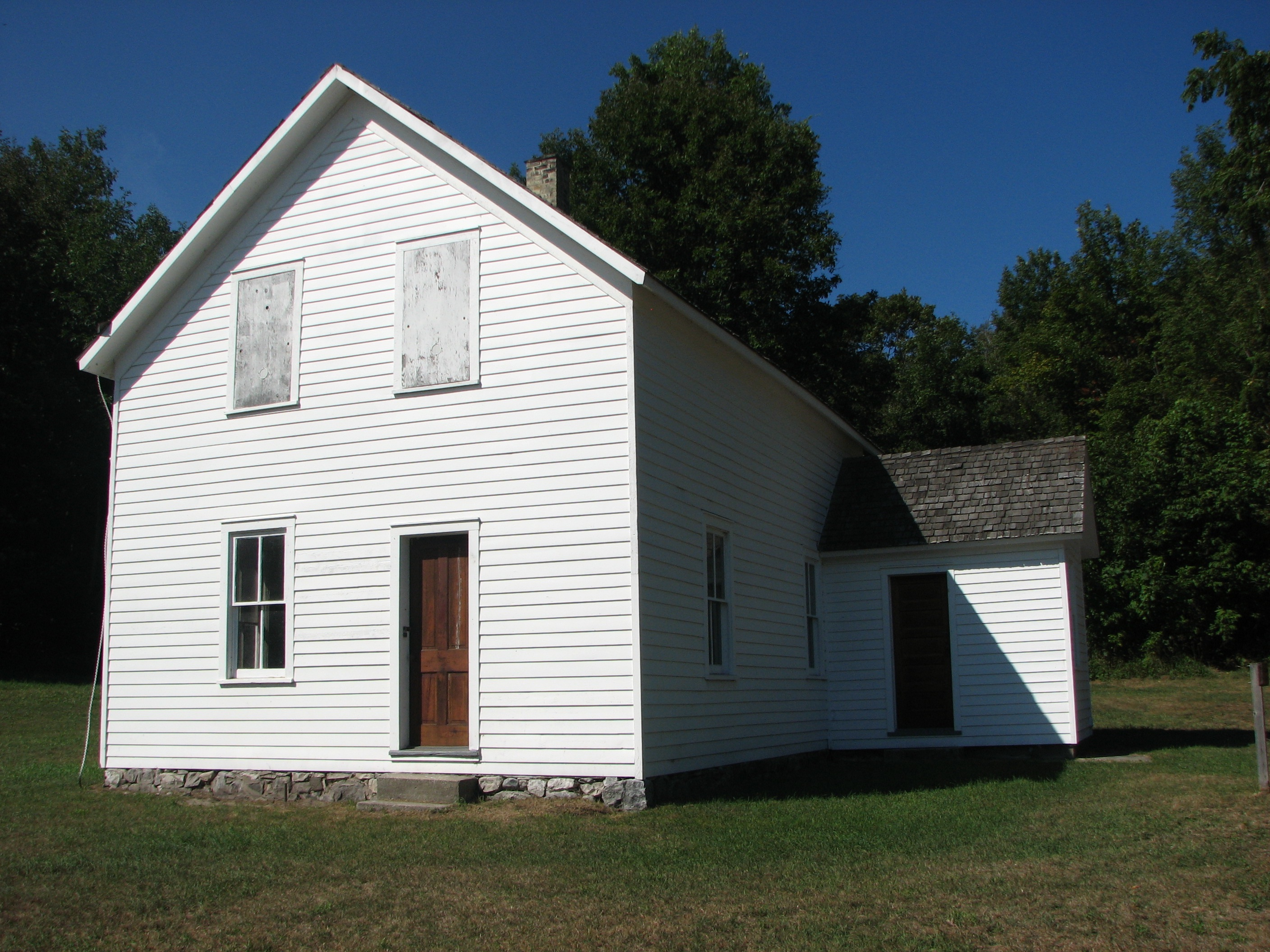
Farmhouse

The George Conrad Hutzler Farm is located on 160 acres (65 ha) near the center of the island. The farm contains a house, barn, five sheds, a chicken coop, and a granary surrounded by old fields.

The George Conrad Hutzler house is a 1 1/2-story wood-frame structure with clapboard siding on a concrete foundation. The house has a gable roof covered in hexagonal slate tiles. The main section measures 30 feet (9.1 m) by 30 feet (9.1 m), and a small shed-roof addition is built on one side.

The associated barn is a gable-roofed structure on a wooden foundation. It is clad with vertical board siding and roofed with wooden shingles. It measures 58 feet (18 m) by 36 feet (11 m) and has a pair of large double wooden doors on one side.

The five sheds are all gable roofed wooden structures. They are:

- Two-story 18 feet (5.5 m) by 20 feet (6.1 m) structure with wooden shingles and board-and-batten siding.
- One-story 18 feet (5.5 m) by 10 feet (3.0 m) structure with an asphalt roof and tarpaper siding.
- One-story 4 feet (1.2 m) by 16 feet (4.9 m) structure with wooden shingles and horizontal board siding.
- One-story 39 feet (12 m) by 21 feet (6.4 m) structure asphalt shingles and horizontal board siding.
- One-story 10 feet (3.0 m) by 16 feet (4.9 m) structure with wooden shingles and horizontal board siding.

The chicken coop consists of two connected structures. The larger structure measures 10 feet (3.0 m) by 22 feet (6.7 m), with an asphalt-covered shed roof and vertical board siding on a wood foundation. The smaller part measures 10 feet (3.0 m) by 13 feet (4.0 m), with an asphalt-covered gable roof and vertical board siding on a wood foundation.

The granary is a 1 1/2-story wood-frame structure measuring 18 feet (5.5 m) by 20 feet (6.1 m), with a small one-story shed attached to the rear. It has a wood foundation and is covered by a gable roof with wood shingles. A corn crib is on one side.

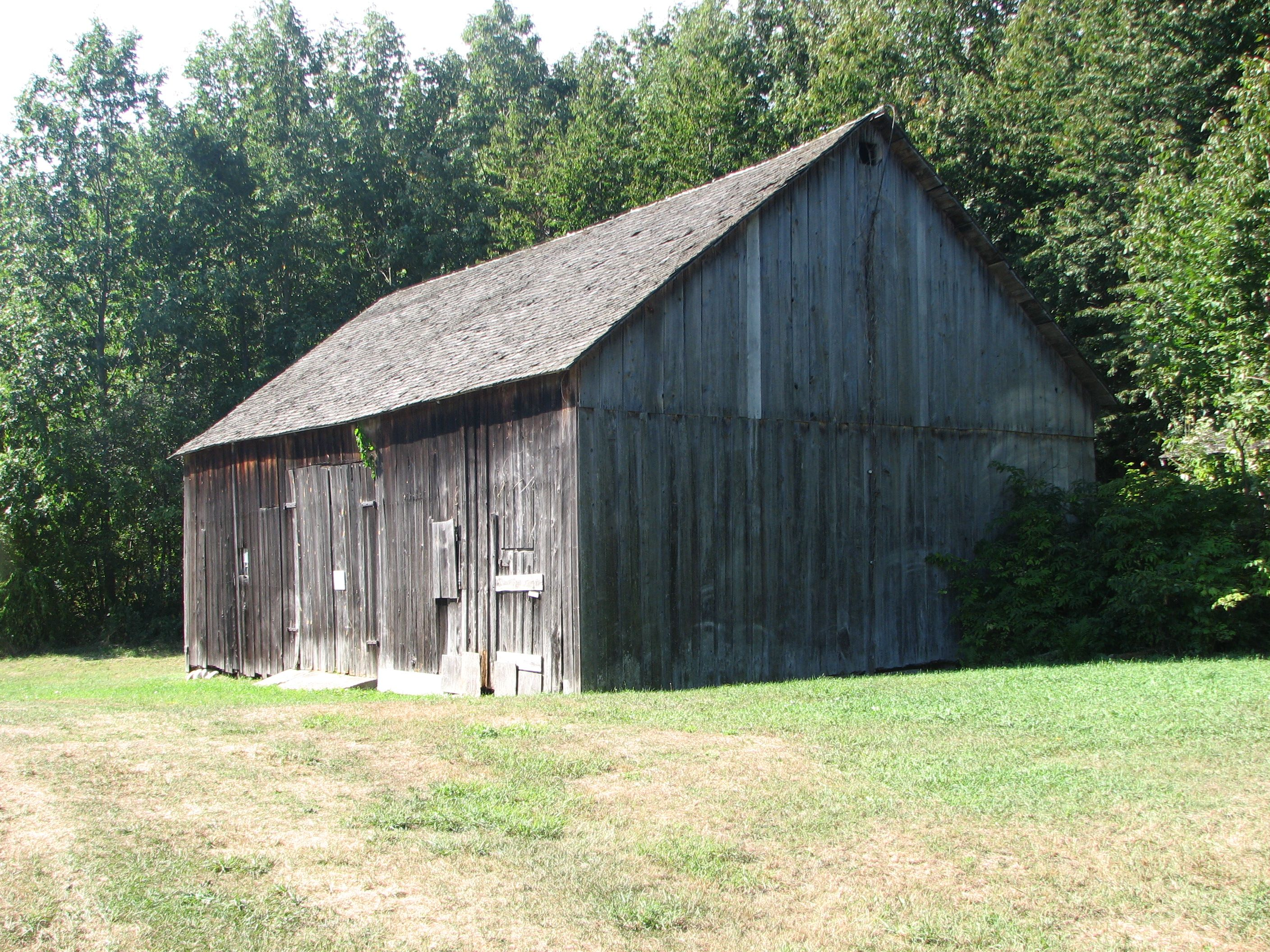

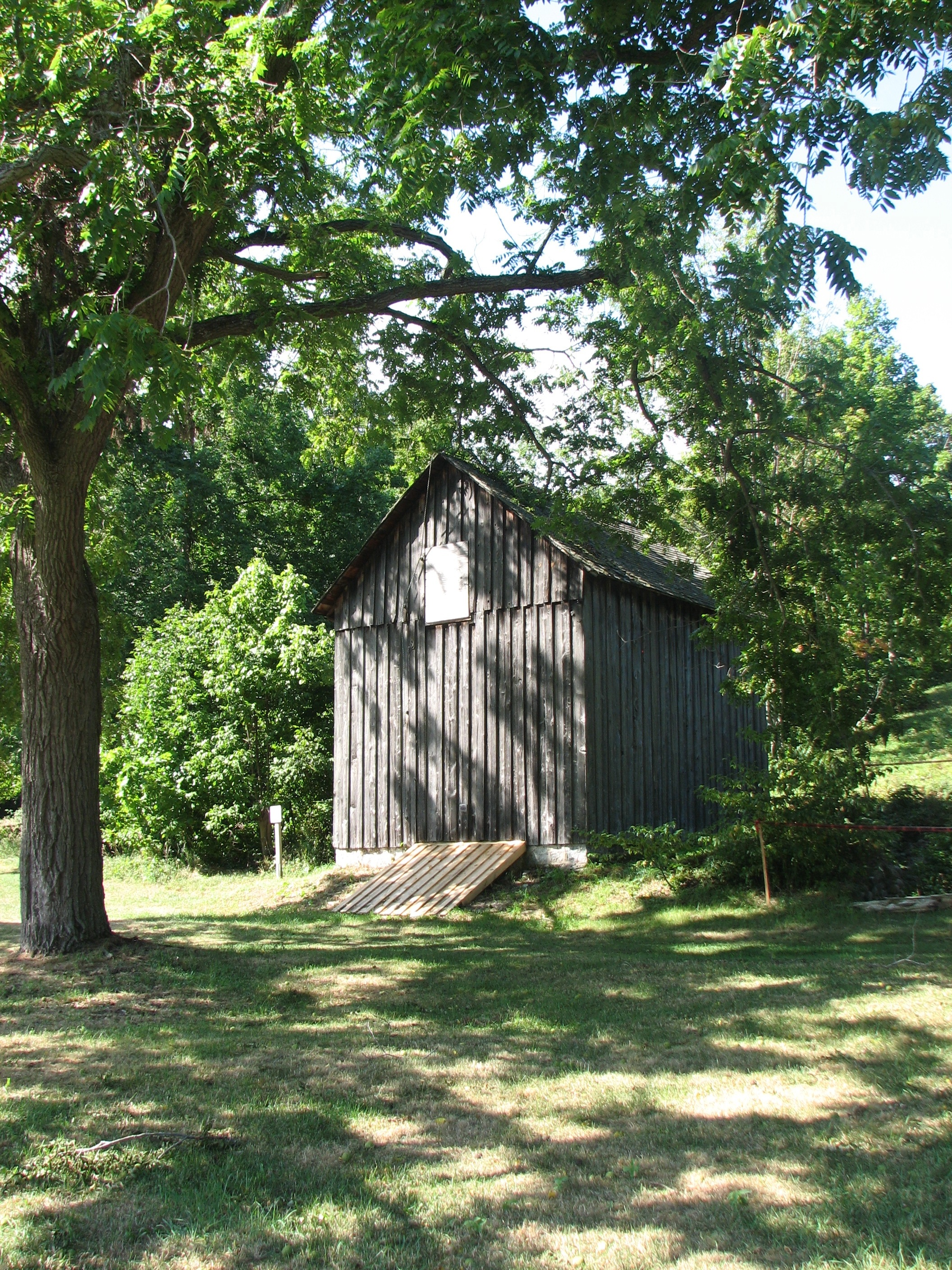

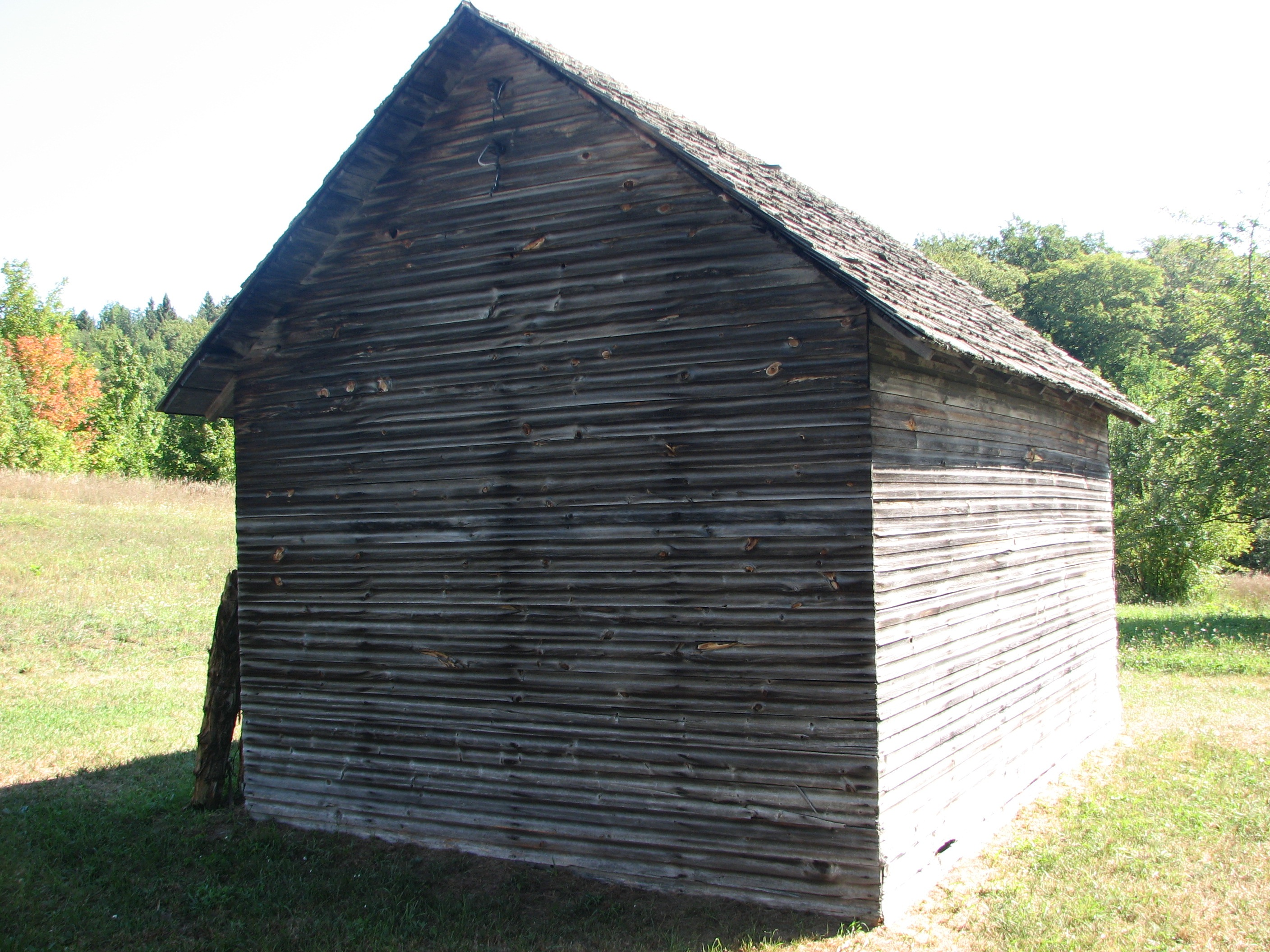

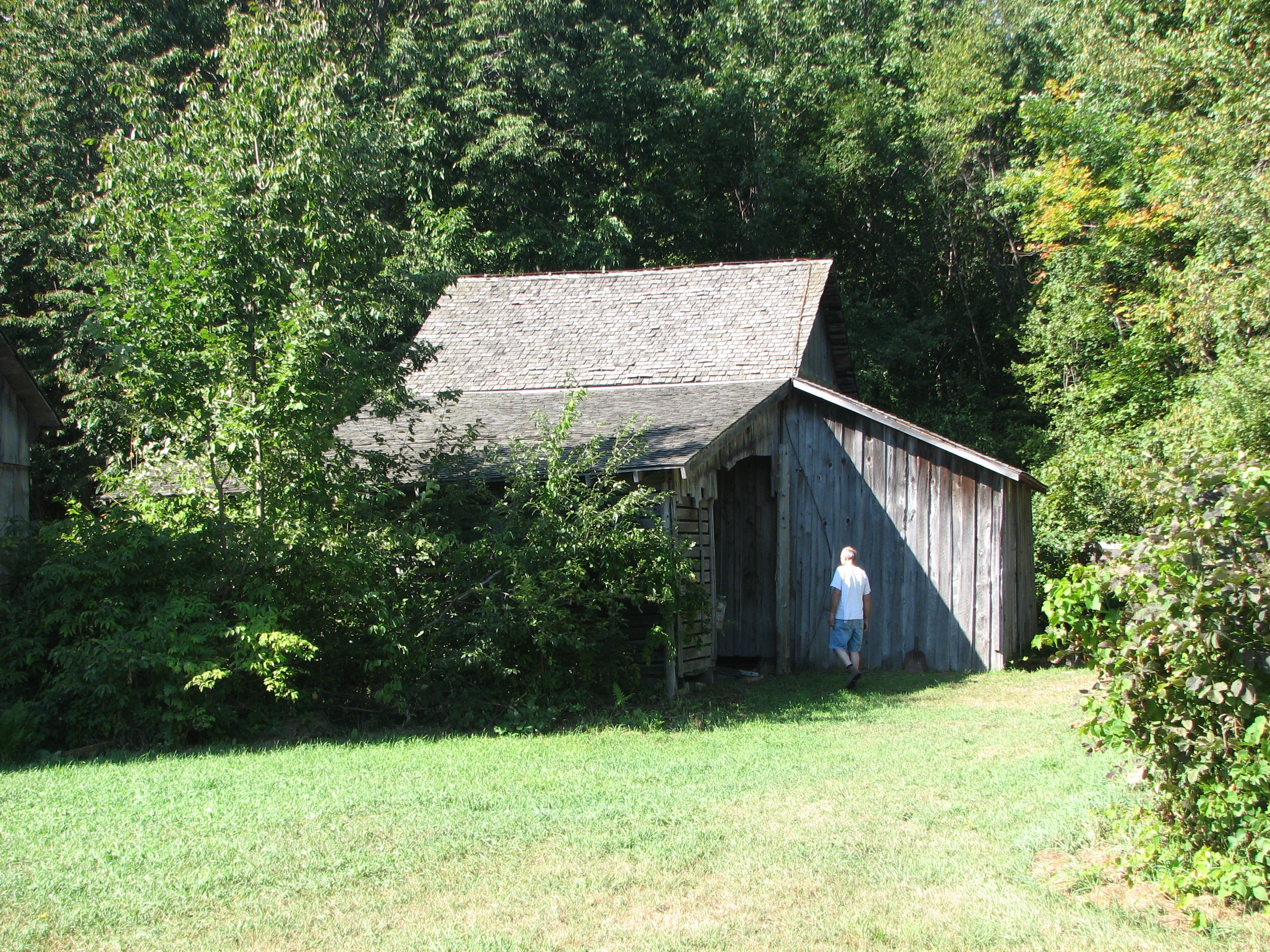
