= Hutzler's Barn =

- U.S. National Register of Historic Places
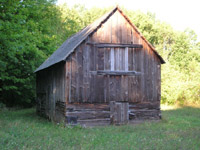

- Location within Michigan Location within the United States
- Interactive map
- Location: N of the cemetery, South Manitou Island
- Nearest city: Leland, Michigan
- Coordinates: 45°2′16″N 86°6′52″W
- Area: 1 acre (0.40 ha)
- Built: 1875
- Built by: George Johann Hutzler
- NRHP reference No.: 78000375
- Added to NRHP: January 3, 1978

Hutzler's Barn is an agricultural building located north of the cemetery on South Manitou Island (in Lake Michigan near Leland, Michigan). It is the oldest remaining portion of George Johann Hutzler's homestead, and is significant for its role in the development of prize-winning Rosen rye and Michelite seeds. It was listed on the National Register of Historic Places in 1978.

== History ==
George Johann Hutzler was born in about 1815 and lived in the small village Oberkrumbach near Kirchensittenbach, Bavaria. In 1853, he and his wife Margaretha, along with their children, emigrated for America. They arrived in early 1854, and immediately traveled to Buffalo, New York, to join Hutzler's half-brother, George Conrad Hutzler. George Johann found work as a sailor on the steamer Iowa (likely following in the footsteps of his half-brother). He soon went to work, likely part-time, for Burton, Lord & Co. on South Manitou Island, supplying wood to steamers. At some point in the late 1850s or (more likely) in 1860, George Johann Hutzler moved his wife and family from Buffalo to South Manitou Island.

In 1863, Hutzler staked a claim to 160 acres of land on the island; he was the first farmer to stake a claim on the island. He grew crops on his land and eventually added animals. He constructed this barn some time between 1870 and 1880 to house swine. George Johann Hutzler died in 1890 and was buried on the farm. His son John (born on the island in 1865) took over ownership of the farm; Margaretha stayed there until 1901 when she moved to Chicago. John married Bertha Peth in 1893; the couple had one child in 1899 who died in 1901. John and Bertha soon divorced, but apparently got along amicably when living apart.

In the 1920s, researchers from Michigan Agricultural College (now Michigan State University) chose South Manitou Island to work on experimental hybridization of rye plants, due primarily to its isolation from other rye crops which prevented accidental cross-pollination. Many of the island farmers, including John Hutzler, participated in experimental hybridization of crops, including prize-winning the Rosen rye and Michelite pea beans that were once significant field crops in Michigan.

However, during the Great Depression, transportation on the Great Lakes declined, and South Manitou Island farmer had a more difficult time getting their crops to market; even the experimental farming that many farm families, including the Hutzlers, engaged in could not sustain the farms on the island. As a result, families began leaving in the 1940s. John Hutzler died in 1944. After his death, development groups purchased many of the farms on the island. However, development activities never materialized. In the 1970s, the National Park Service purchased the Hutzler farm (along with other South Manitou Island properties) from Martin J. McCarthy, and took over management as part of the Sleeping Bear Dunes National Lakeshore.

== Description ==
Hutzler's Barn is located in a clearing along with the Hutzler farmhouse and other outbuildings in various states of repair. the barn is a 2 1/2-story frame, gable-roof swine barn, measuring 16 feet (4.9 m) by 30 feet (9.1 m), sitting on 16-inch-square wooden beams. The upper level was used to store hay, while the lower level was used to house pigs. The walls are constructed from weathered wood with the front gable roof covered with tar paper. The interior of the barn is partitioned into three sections, each with its own entrance.
