= Sleeping Bear Inn =

- U.S. National Register of Historic Places
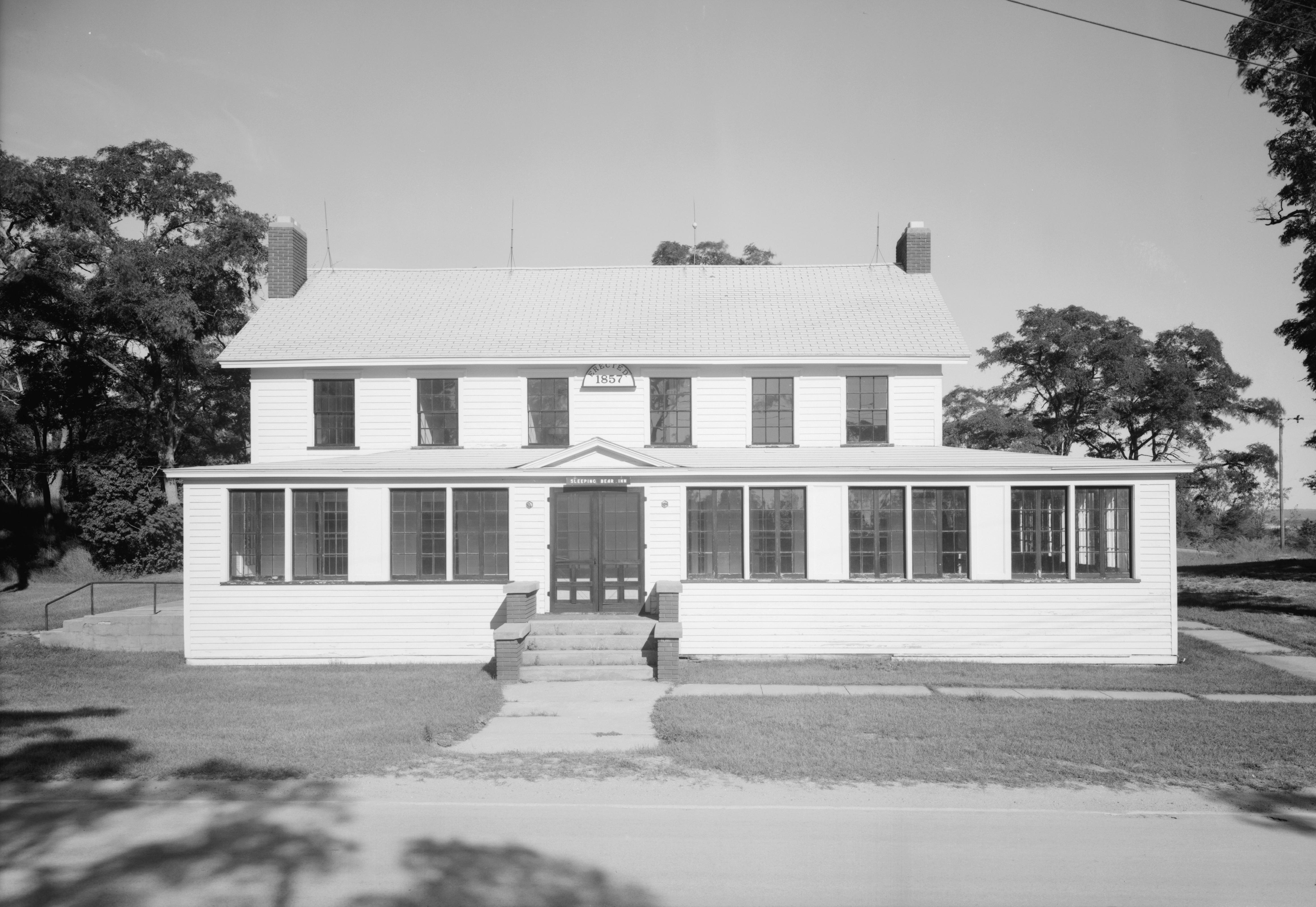

- Location within Michigan Location within the United States
- Interactive map
- Location: Glenn Haven Road, Glen Haven, Michigan
- Coordinates: 44°54′15″N 86°1′38″W
- Area: 1 acre (0.40 ha)
- Built: 1857
- NRHP reference No.: 79000284
- Added to NRHP: September 6, 1979

The Sleeping Bear Inn, also known as the Glen Haven Inn, is a hotel located on Glenn Haven Road in Glen Haven, Michigan. It was designated a Michigan State Historic Site in 1996 and listed on the National Register of Historic Places in 1985.

== History ==
This inn, originally called the "Sleeping Bear House," was built in 1857 by C.C. McCarthy, using standard plans. McCarthy also built a sawmill nearby. Development in the area slowed during the Civil War, but after the war's conclusion settlement in the area boomed. In 1865, McCarthy built a dock nearby, and the protected harbor of Glen Haven began to be used as a stop. The Sleeping Bear Inn served as a boarding house for the dock workers and lumberjacks who worked in the area, as well as an inn for passengers travelling on the steamships. It also served as a stopping point for settlers moving into the area. A rear addition was constructed around this time.

In 1878, Philo Chamberlain, president of the Northern Transit Company steamship line, acquired the inn and the rest of the properties in Glen Haven to assure an adequate wooding stop for the company's vessels. Chamberlain chose D. H. Day as his local agent. Day lived in the Sleeping Bear Inn until his marriage in 1889. In the meantime, he purchased the village of Glen Haven from Chamberlain, including the Inn, and opened a general store nearby.

As tourism increased, the Sleeping Bear Inn became more of a resort hotel. The porch was enclosed in 1928. However, usage eventually declined, and the Inn was closed in 1973. The National Park Service purchased the properties in Glen Haven in the mid-1970s, and used the inn as a dormitory for a time. As of 2013, the NOS was seeking proposals for adaptive reuse of the building.

== Description ==
The Sleeping Bear Inn is a two-story side gable frame building sided with clapboards. A rear addition was constructed later, as was an enclosed porch on the north and east sides.
