= Platte River Campground Site =

Archaeological site in Michigan, United States

- Platte River Campground
- U.S. National Register of Historic Places
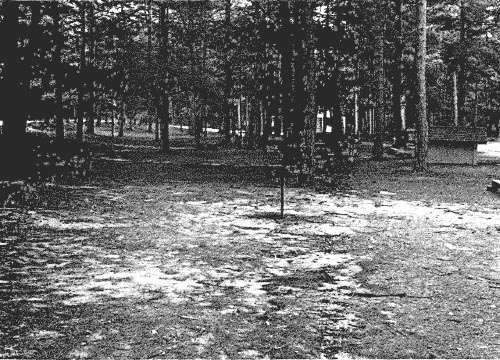
- Portion of the Platte River Campground Site

- Location within Michigan Location within the United States
- Interactive map
- Location: along the Platte River, within the Sleeping Bear Dunes National Lakeshore
- Coordinates: 44°43′0″N 86°7′0″W
- Area: 9 acres (3.6 ha)
- NRHP reference No.: 90000605
- Added to NRHP: April 27, 1990

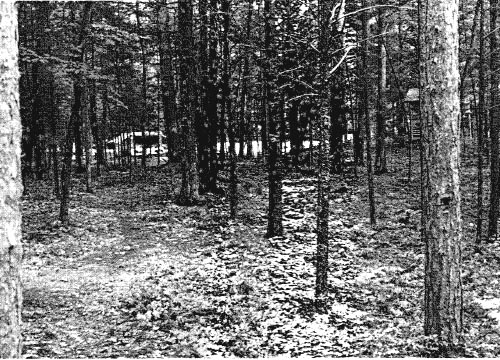
Portion of the Platte River Campground Site

The Platte River Campground Site, designated 20BZ16, is an archaeological site located along the Platte River, within the Sleeping Bear Dunes National Lakeshore near Empire, Michigan. It is significant as a largely intact record of prehistoric life over a long span of time. It was listed on the National Register of Historic Places in 1990.

== History ==
The site of the Platte River Campground was used sporadically over a wide span of time, estimated to be A.D. 130-1269, during Middle and Late Woodland period. Evidence suggests that this occupation was short-term, consistent with a seasonal camping site, rather than long-term.

In the late 19th and early 20th century, the logging community of Edgewater was established on the shore of Platte Lake; the community overlapped the prehistoric campground. After the area was logged, the State of Michigan turned the location into a campground; the campground became part of the Sleeping Bear Dunes National Lakeshore upon its creation in 1973.

Archaeological artifacts were first discovered at the Platte River Campground site in 1985. Although an earlier survey in 1976 had covered the area, the prehistoric site at the Platte River Campground had been missed. Archaeological excavations were conducted at the site in 1987 to assess the impact of a planned campground redevelopment program. Although the site had seen constant use for over 50 years as a campground, the site maintained a high degree of integrity.

== Description ==
The Platte River Campground site extends 300 meters (980 ft) along the north bank of the Platte River, and runs up to 160 meters (520 ft) deep. The site is a multicomponent site, with repeated prehistoric occupations over the Middle and Late Woodland Periods as well as historic occupation around the turn of the 20th century; thus, artifacts were found covering a range of time periods.

The artifacts recovered included a great many fire cracked rocks and chert flakes. Some ceramic sherds and stone projectile points were also discovered, as well as two celts and two copper artifacts. Historic artifacts, presumably related to the logging community of Edgewater, were also discovered.
