= M-209 (Michigan highway) =

Former state highway in Glen Haven, Leelanau County, Michigan, United States

M-209
- Glen Haven Road
- M-209 highlighted in red

Route information
- Maintained by MDOT
- Length: 0.543 mi (874 m)
- Existed: 1920s–June 5, 1995

Major junctions
- South end: M-109 near Glen Haven
- North end: Coast Guard Life Saving Station in Glen Haven

Location
- Country: United States
- State: Michigan
- Counties: Leelanau

Highway system
- Michigan State Trunkline Highway System; Interstate; US; State; Byways
| ← M-208 | → M-211 |

M-209 was a state trunkline highway in the Lower Peninsula of the US state of Michigan. It was located in Leelanau County in the Sleeping Bear Dunes National Lakeshore. Until it was decommissioned, it was Michigan's shortest state highway. M-209 started at M-109 and went just over 1/2 mile (about 956 yards [874 m]) to Glen Haven. In 1995, M-209's designation was "abandoned", and the road was turned over to the jurisdiction of the Leelanau County Road Commission.

== Route description ==
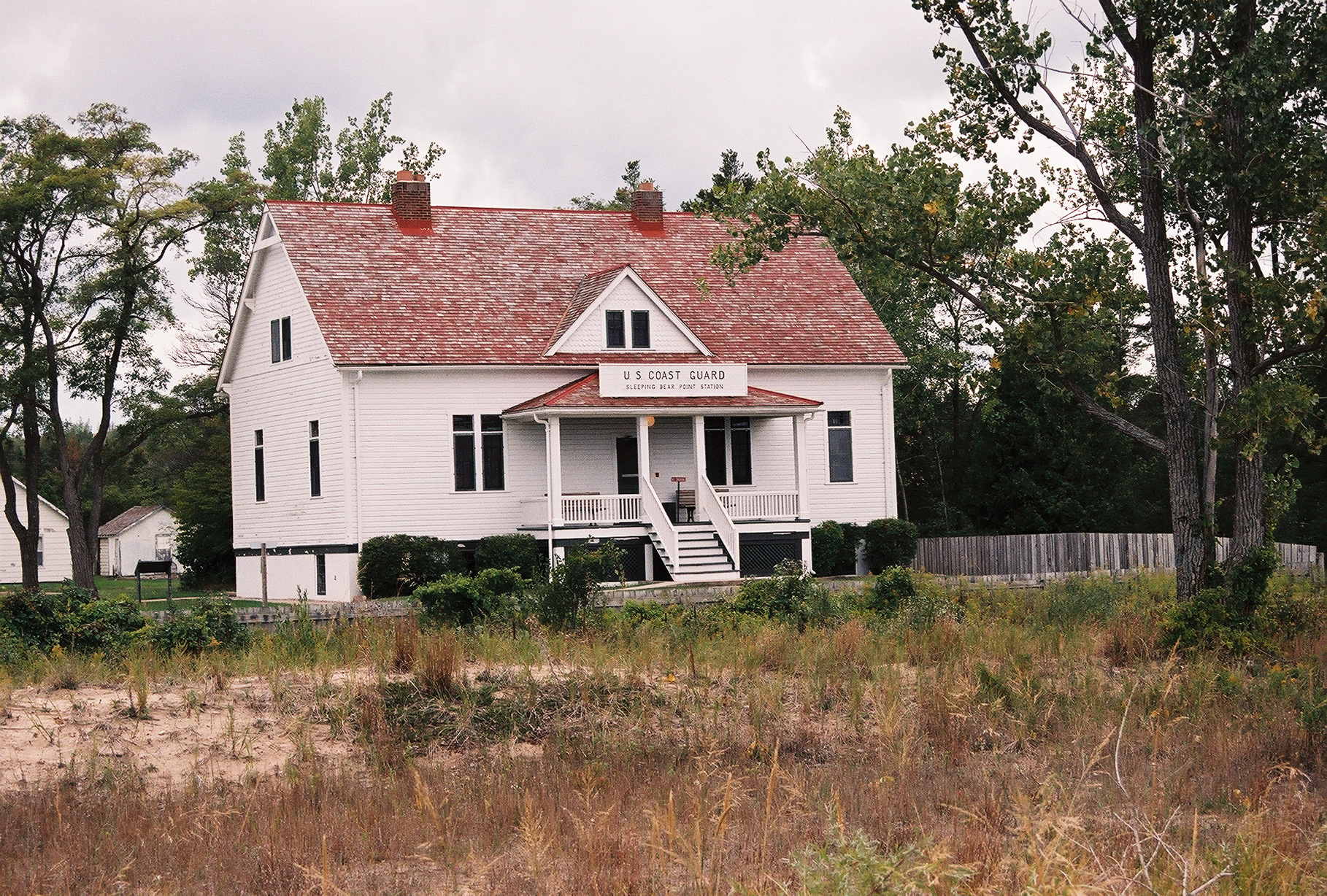
The US Coast Guard Life Saving Station at Sleeping Bear Point, Glen Haven

M-209 was the short connector route from M-109 to the Glen Haven unit of the Sleeping Bear Dunes National Lakeshore west of Glen Arbor. The southern terminus of the highway was at the intersection with M-109 south of Glen Haven, a restored logging village on the shore of Lake Michigan on the Leelanau Peninsula. The roadway ran north from this intersection where M-109 made a 90–degree corner through the south and east legs of a four-way intersection with M-209 and Dune Valley Road. M-209 ran past such attractions as the restored General Store and Blacksmith Shop. Also located in Glen Haven is the former Glen Haven Canning Co. building. This building was first used as a warehouse and later as a cannery for cherries in the 1920s. It has since been restored as the Cannery Boathouse housing historic wooden boats used in the Manitou Passage between Glen Haven, Glen Arbor and the North and South Manitou islands. The northern terminus of M-209 was located in front of the former US Coast Guard Life Saving Station, now restored as a maritime museum. The museum is located at the intersection of Glen Haven Road and Sleeping Bear Dunes Road. At the time of decommissioning, M-209 was a two-lane, paved road.

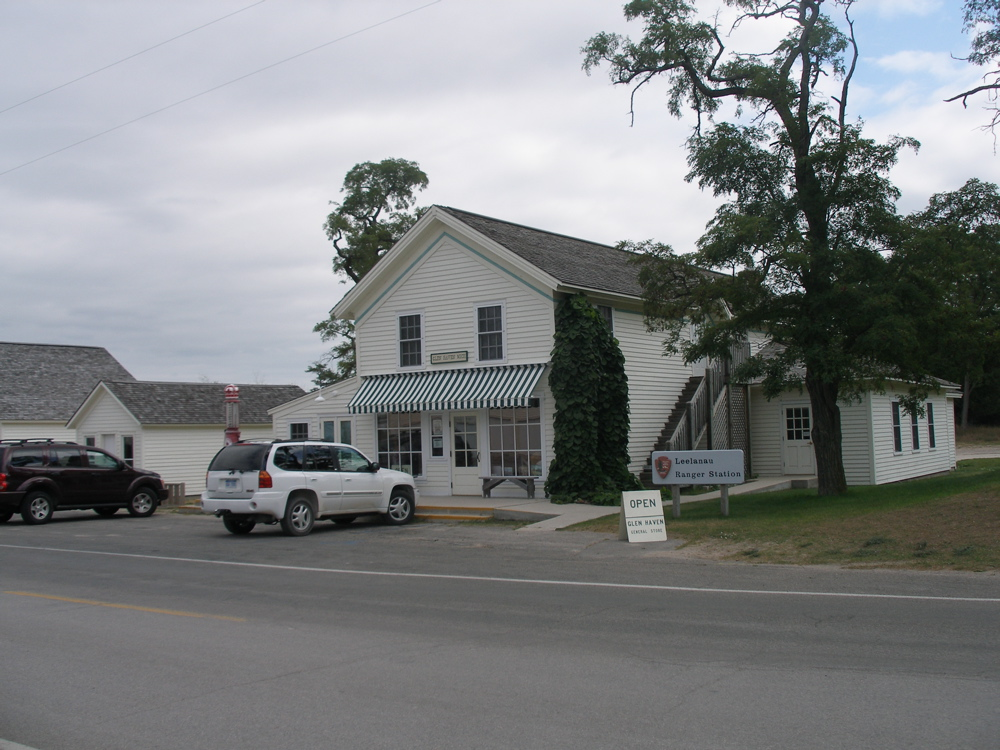
The restored Glen Haven General Store

Sleeping Bear Dunes National Lakeshore is a United States National Lakeshore located on the "little finger" of the Lower Peninsula of Michigan in Leelanau and Benzie counties. The park covers a 35-mile (56 km) stretch of Lake Michigan's eastern coastline, as well as North and South Manitou islands. The park was authorized on October 21, 1970.

== History ==
From its inception in the 1920s, M-209 was Michigan's shortest highway. It connected the small community of Glen Haven to M-109 just south of the community. Glen Haven was founded as a settlement called Sleeping Bearville with a sawmill and an inn, the Sleeping Bear House, in 1857. By 1881, there were 11 buildings in the community. The lifesaving station was built in 1901 and moved to its present location in 1931 before closing in 1941.

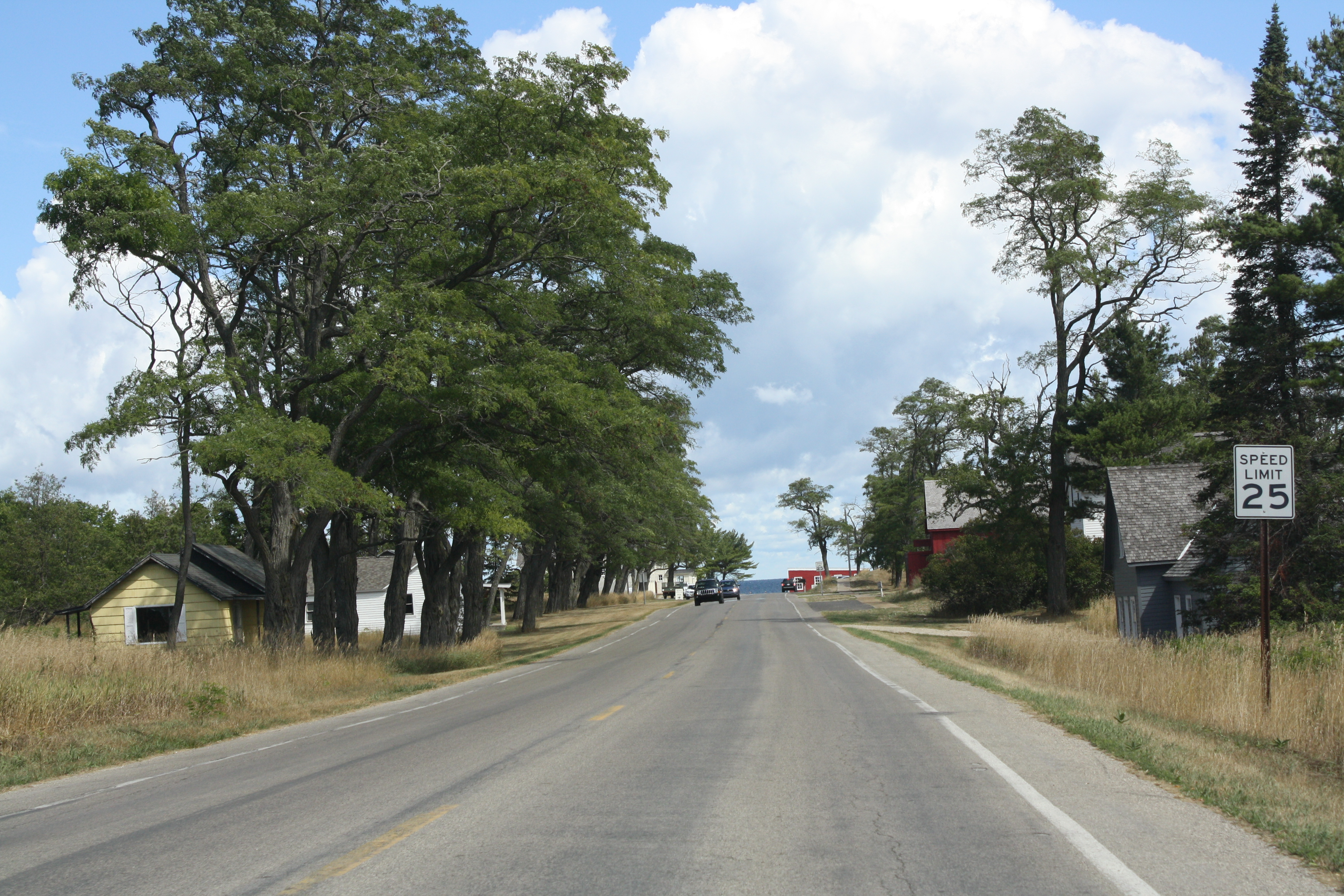
Looking north along former M-209 in August 2011

M-209 was first assumed as a state trunkline in the 1920s. A newspaper article in 1957 noted that M-209 provided access to Sleeping Bear Dune, the country's largest moving sand dune. The article also noted that if it wasn't for the tourists visiting, that the dune would probably have swallowed up the roadway that was "so small the road maps don't even show it". Two years later, it was listed as a primary all-season route by the State Highway Department. A newspaper article in The Grand Rapids Press in 1963 noted the highway's short length and ran a photograph produced with a telephoto lens that showed the full length of the highway, denoted as 0.7 miles (1.1 km). Other profiles of the superlative highways in 1962, 1964, and 1966 noted that it was 0.4 miles (0.64 km) long.

The highway would later serve the national lakeshore when the park was created on October 21, 1970. The Park Service purchased all of the village by the mid-1970s. The highway was turned over to Leelanau County control on June 5, 1995. It is now known only as Glen Haven Road. Since the transfer, M-212 in Cheboygan County is now the shortest highway in the state. A 1967 newspaper article noted that Business Spur Interstate 375 had opened that year and took the title as shortest highway in the state, although that highway is not signed.

== Major intersections ==
The entire highway was in Glen Arbor Township, Leelanau County.

| mi | km | Destinations | Notes |
|---|---|---|---|
| 0.000 | 0.000 | M-109 – Empire, Glen Arbor | |
| 0.543 | 0.874 | Coast Guard station access road | |
1.000 mi = 1.609 km; 1.000 km = 0.621 mi
