= Sleeping Bear Point Life Saving Station =

- U.S. National Register of Historic Places
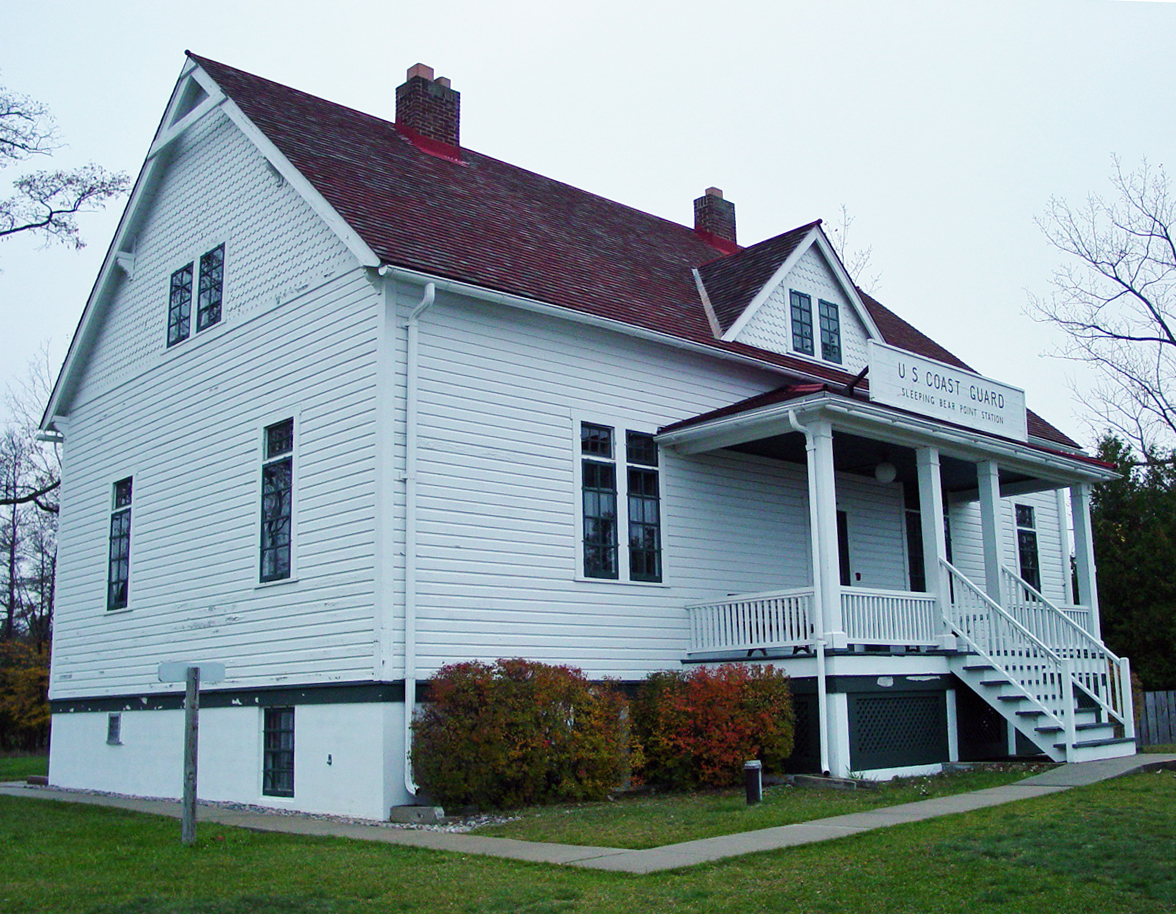

- Location within Michigan Location within the United States
- Interactive map
- Nearest city: Glen Haven, Michigan
- Coordinates: 44°54′31″N 86°2′1″W
- Area: 2.1 acres (0.85 ha)
- Built: 1901
- Built by: Robert J.B. Newcombe
- NRHP reference No.: 79000285
- Added to NRHP: April 26, 1979

The Sleeping Bear Point Life Saving Station, also known as the Glen Haven Coast Guard Station, is a Coast Guard station located near Glen Haven, Michigan. It is significant as a nearly intact version of what was, when built, a prototype architectural design. It was listed on the National Register of Historic Places in 1979, and is now the Sleeping Bear Point Coast Guard Station Maritime Museum and part of the Sleeping Bear Dunes National Lakeshore.

== History ==
The Sleeping Bear Point Life Saving Station was constructed in 1901 by Robert J.B. Newcombe using prototype plans developed by the United States Life-Saving Service. The station was primarily staffed by local volunteers. It was originally located at a site about a mile west of the current location, but the inaccessibility of the original site prompted the Coast Guard to move the station to the present location in 1931. However, during World War II, operations at the station ceased, and it was eventually closed permanently in 1958.

Ownership of the station was later transferred to the National Park Service, and it is now part of the Sleeping Bear Dunes National Lakeshore. Beginning in 1971, and for several summers thereafter, the station served as the visitor center for the Lakeshore. In 1982- 1983, the bulk of the Life Saving Station was restored to its 1931 appearance. The interior of the boathouse and the crew's bedroom were restored their early 1900s. In the spring of 1984, the station re-opened as a maritime museum.

== Description ==
The Sleeping Bear Point Life Saving Station includes four buildings: a residence, a boat house, a storage shed, and a signal tower. The residence is a two-story frame building on a cement foundation with a wood-shingled gable roof. A porch with four square columns spans the front of the structure. The nearby boat house is also a wooden frame structure, covered with vertical siding and topped with a wood shingle hip roof and an octagonal cupola.
