= Campbell–DeYoung Farm =

- U.S. National Register of Historic Places
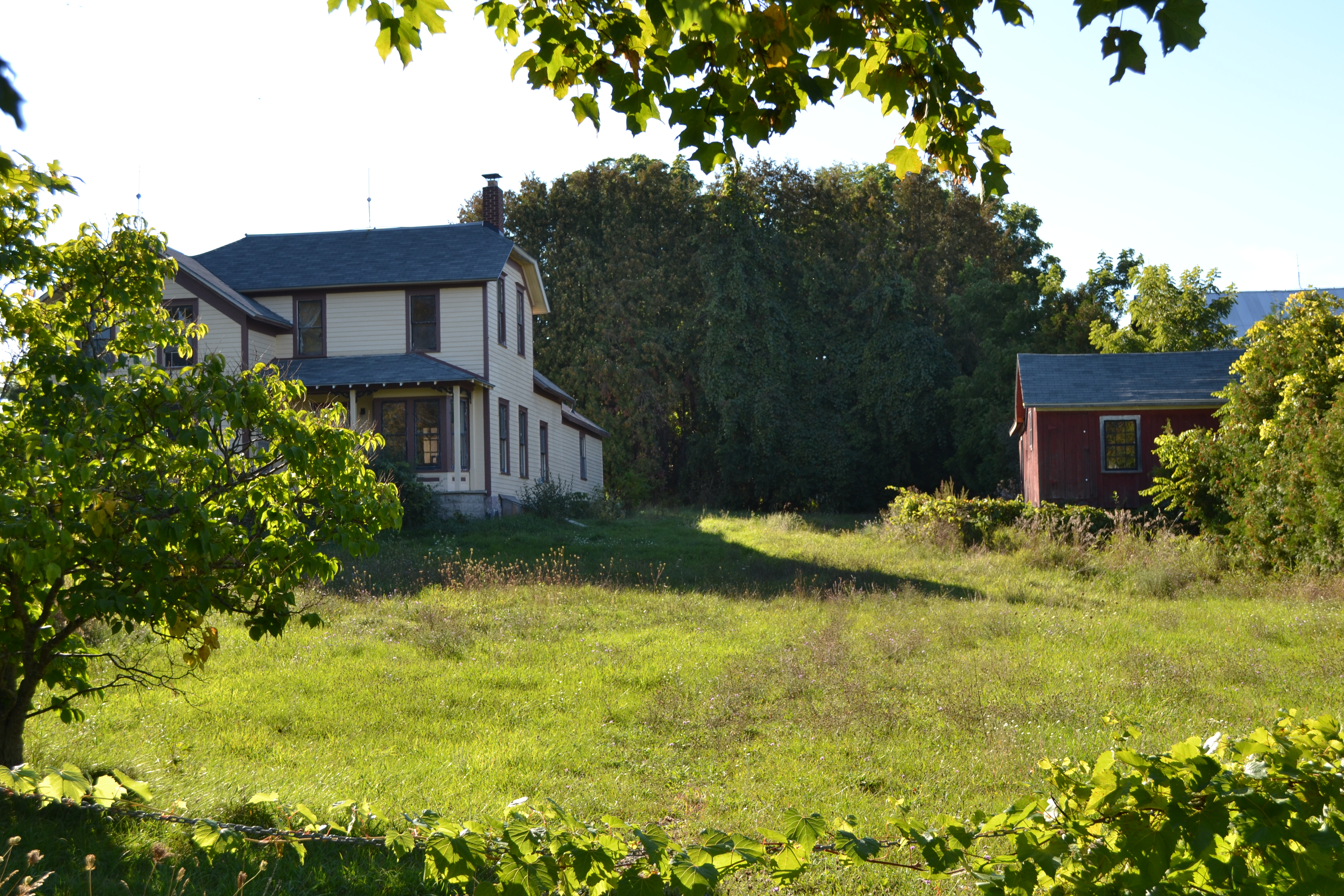

- Location within Michigan Location within the United States
- Interactive map
- Location: 9510 E. Cherry Bend Rd., Elmwood Charter Township, Michigan
- Coordinates: 44°48′32″N 85°39′18″W
- Area: 145 acres (59 ha)
- Built: 1860
- Architectural style: Victorian
- NRHP reference No.: 11000634
- Added to NRHP: September 8, 2011

The Campbell–DeYoung Farm is a farmstead located at 9510 East Cherry Bend Road in Elmwood Charter Township, Michigan. It is currently operated as a recreational area by the Leelanau Conservancy, and known as the DeYoung Natural Area. It was listed on the National Register of Historic Places in 2011.

== History ==
Henry Campbell purchased an 80-acre parcel of land on this location in 1855. Campbell constructed the Victorian house about 1860. In 1885, Campbell purchased additional property bordering Cedar Lake. In 1904, he sold the property to his son Julius. The Campbells constructed most of the other buildings on the property before selling to Dr. Marc Kroupa and his wife Myrtle in 1919. The Kroupa's daughter, Iris Lucille, married Louis DeYoung in the early 1920s; in 1925 Louis and Iris purchased the farm.

However, Louis and Iris soon divorced and Louis married Esther LaVerne ("Verney") Stolcenberg in 1929. The couple had two children, Ted and Patricia. Verney died in 1968 and the following year Louis married a young Danish immigrant named Elly Fibranz. Louis DeYoung died in 2004, but not before exploring ways to preserve his farm from the rapidly encroaching suburbanization. His son sold the farm to the Leelanau Conservancy in 2008.

== Description ==
The 1860 farmhouse is a two-story Upright and Wing style Victorian frame house on a fieldstone foundation and clad with clapboards. It may have been originally constructed as a single-room house, with the upright portion added at a later date. A second story was added to the top of the original wing at some point early in the 20th century; a porch fronting the wing was added at the same time. The exterior of the house looks substantially the same as it did at that time.

The carriage house/garage was constructed in about 1880. It is a simple two-story, wood-framed structure with a large, open first floor and a loft area on the second, connected with an internal stair. The exterior is covered with vertical board and batten siding and the roof is shingled.

The hay barn, located across the road from the main complex, was constructed in 1884. It is a timber-framed English barn on a dressed stone foundation with a silo at one corner. The front has double wood sliding doors in the center. The interior space was used for hay storage, with an additional area for cows.

The upper barn, set back from the road and the main complex of buildings, was constructed in 1886. It is a timber-frame construction on a fieldstone foundation and gable roof. A series of ornamental lightning rods line the ridge of the roof; there was originally a cupola at the top, which was removed in 1935. The basement level contains stalls for animals, while the main level was used for equipment and hay storage. Partitions are installed in the loft, likely used for migrant quarters.

The powerhouse/workshop was constructed in about 1900 to house a waterwheel to power the farmstead. It is an L-shaped, wood-framed, utility building on a stone foundation and clad in vertical siding. Inside is an overshot metal wheel within a stone and cement chamber beneath the building, which at one time was fed through a series of hand-dug troughs from a nearby stream. In about 1930 the building was converted to a workshop.

The farm has several other outbuildings. These include:

- A c. 1880 single-story gabled granary.
- A c. 1900 vertically sided chicken coop. The chicken coop has a double-hung window and drywall and plaster on the interior, suggesting it may have been converted to house migrant workers.
- A small, vertically sided outhouse built c. 1900.
- A c. 1940 washroom for migrant workers. The cement block washroom was built on the stone foundation of an earlier building. There are two entrances, labelled "men" and "women," but no interior partitions or plumbing remaining.
- A c. 1940 single story, one room concrete block structure used as a milkhouse. The interior concrete floor is sloped toward the center.
- The cement block remains of c. 1950 structure to house migrant workers. The building has multiple separate entrances, suggesting accommodations for multiple families, but the interior walls and roof are gone.
