= Morgan-Copp-Mervau Building =

United States historic place

- Morgan–Copp–Mervau Building
- U.S. National Register of Historic Places
- Circa 1885

- Location within Michigan Location within the United States
- Interactive map
- Location: 101 N. Mill St., Northport, Michigan
- Coordinates: 45°7′47″N 85°36′57″W
- Area: less than one acre
- Built: 1880
- Architectural style: Late Victorian
- NRHP reference No.: 00000219
- Added to NRHP: March 15, 2000

The Morgan–Copp–Mervau Building, also known as the Corner Store, is a commercial building located at 101 North Mill Street in Northport, Michigan. It was listed on the National Register of Historic Places in 2000.

== History ==
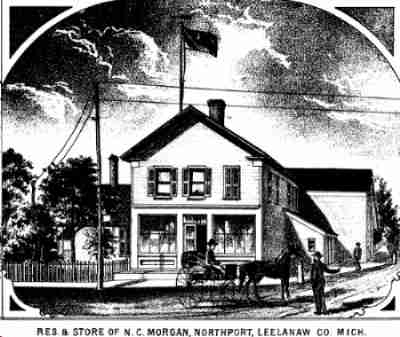
View of the rear home, 1884

The Morgan–Copp–Mervau Building was built in three sections. The first, a single-story building fronting on Nagonaba, was constructed in 1880 as a grocery and dry goods store. The store was owned by Northport native N. C. Morgan and his wife Abbie Voice. An attached two-story section was built on the rear in 1881-83; this served as the Morgans' home. The Morgans moved to Sault Ste Marie in 1887. The two-story section was extended to front onto Mill Street some time before 1905; this section was used for quite some time as Mervau's drugstore. A third section, built diagonally to front onto the Nagonaba/Mill intersection, was built in 1927/28.

In 1996/97, the building was rehabilitated and restored to its original appearance.

== Description ==
The Morgan–Copp–Mervau Building consists of three sections: a single-story false-front clapboard-clad section fronting on Nagonaba, a two-story false-front clapboard-clad section fronting on Mill, and a single-story cedar stickwork addition fronting onto the Nagonaba/Mill intersection. The first two sections form an ell, with the third section oriented diagonally to the first two.
