= Kirchensittenbach =

- Municipality
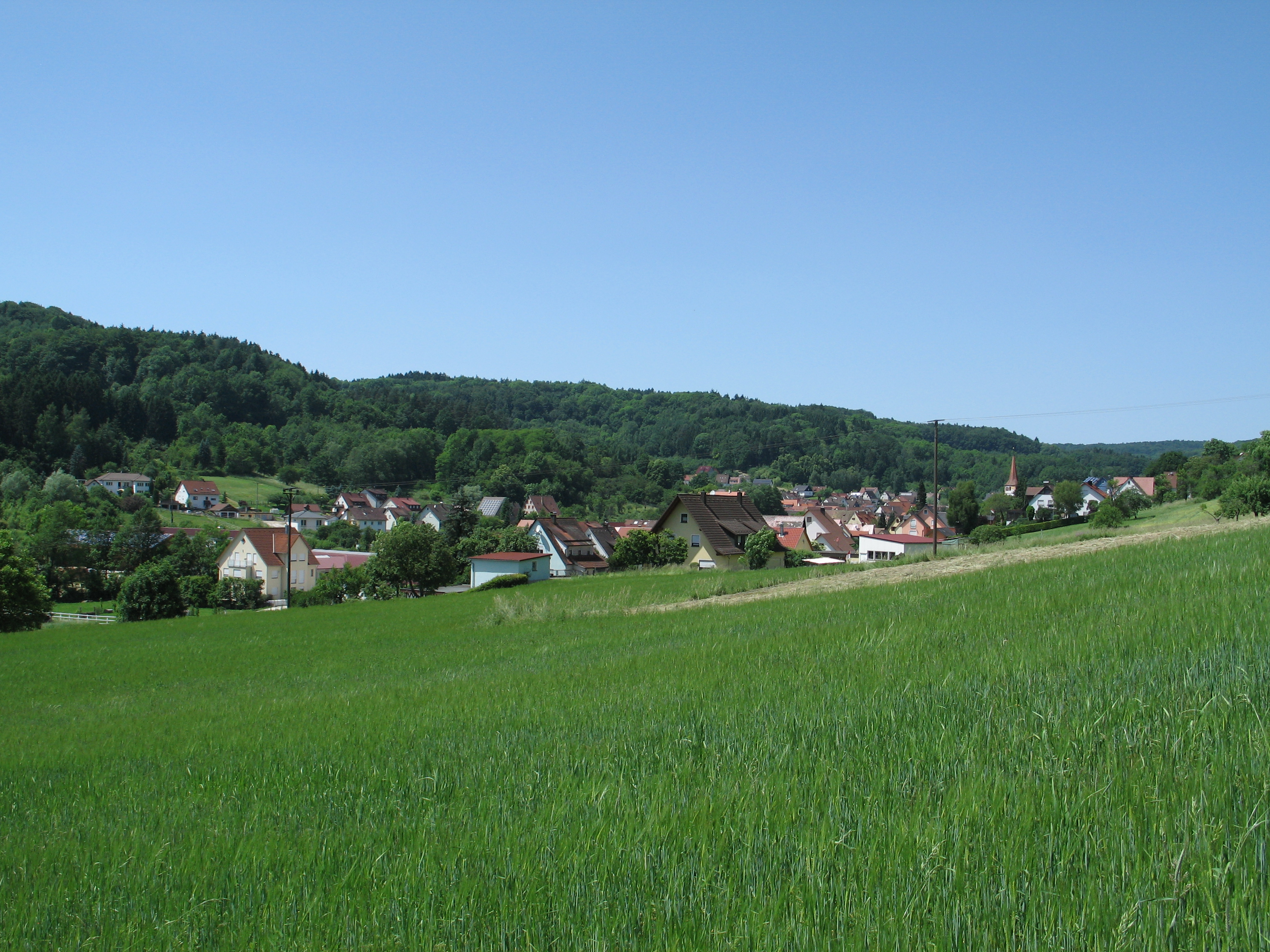
- Kirchensittenbach

- Coat of arms

- Location of Kirchensittenbach within Nürnberger Land district
- Interactive map of Kirchensittenbach
- Location within Germany Location within Bavaria
- Coordinates: 49°33′N 11°25′E
- Country: Germany
- State: Bavaria
- Admin. region: Mittelfranken
- District: Nürnberger Land

Government
  - Mayor (2020–26): Klaus Albrecht

Area
  - Total: 43.21 km^{2} (16.68 sq mi)
- Elevation: 386 m (1,266 ft)

Population (2025-12-31)
  - Total: 2,060
  - Density: 47.7/km^{2} (123/sq mi)
- Time zone: UTC+01:00 (CET)
  - Summer (DST): UTC+02:00 (CEST)
- Postal codes: 91241
- Dialling codes: 09151
- Vehicle registration: LAU, ESB, HEB, N, PEG
- Website: www.kirchensittenbach.de

Kirchensittenbach is a municipality in the district of Nürnberger Land in Bavaria in Germany. Hohenstein Castle stands within it.
