= Bingham District No. 5 Schoolhouse =

- U.S. National Register of Historic Places
- Michigan State Historic Site
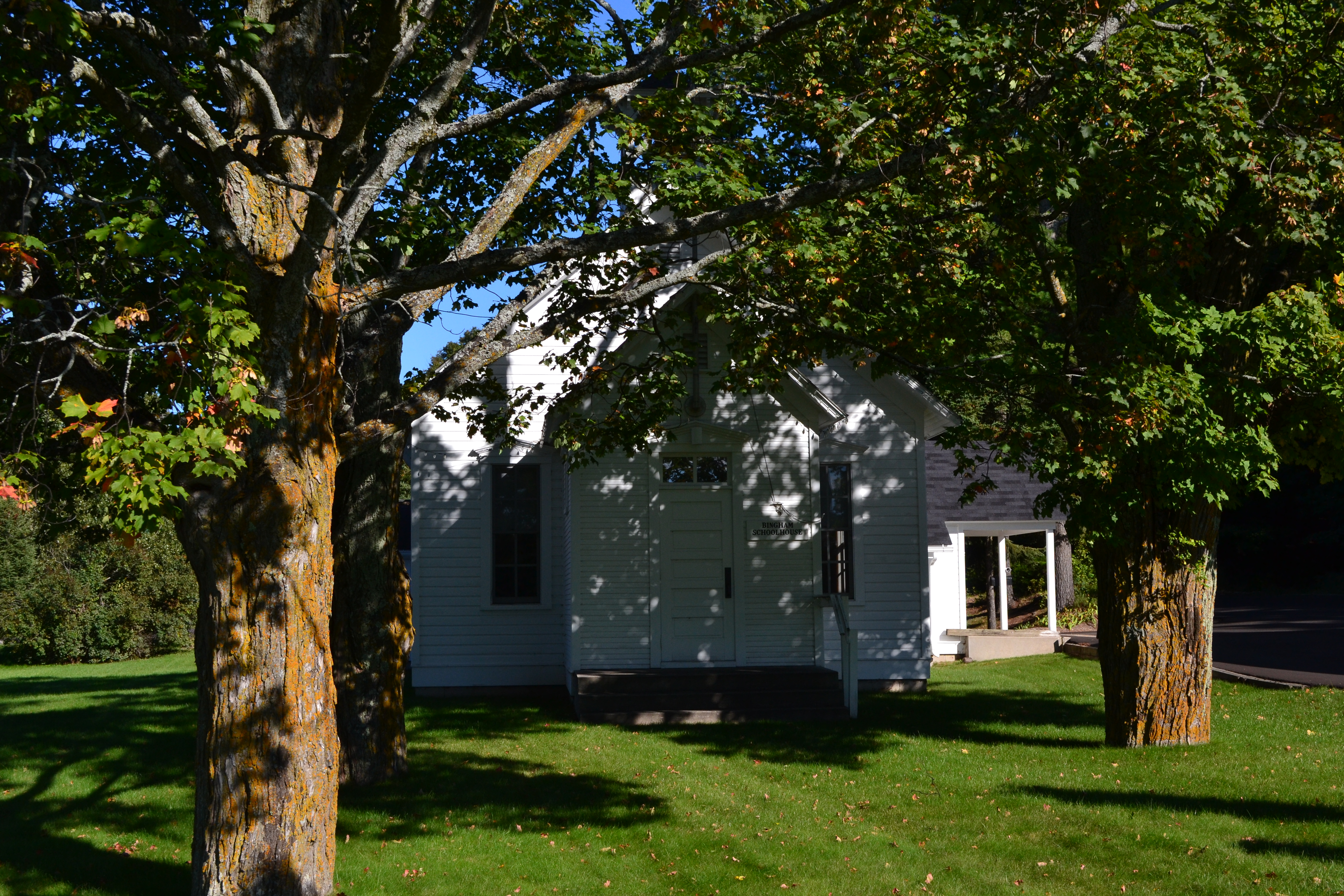

- Location within Michigan Location within the United States
- Interactive map
- Location: 7171 S. Center Hwy, Bingham Township, Leelanau County, Michigan
- Coordinates: 44°52′33″N 85°40′29″W
- Area: 3.5 acres (1.4 ha)
- Built: 1877
- Architectural style: Late 19th century vernacular
- NRHP reference No.: 91000353

Significant dates
- Added to NRHP: July 31, 1991
- Designated MSHS: October 23, 1987

The Bingham District No. 5 Schoolhouse is a school building located at 7171 South Center Highway in Bingham Township, Leelanau County, Michigan. It is now used as the Bingham Township Hall. It was designated a Michigan State Historic Site in 1987 and listed on the National Register of Historic Places in 1991.

== History ==
The village of Bingham prospered during the lumber boom of the 1870s and 1880s. The first Bingham school, a log building, was constructed in 1870. This building was constructed in 1877 as a replacement. It was used for first through eighth grade classes through the rest of the 19th century, and as the population of Bingham declined after the timber was depleted in the 1910s. After World War II, area school districts were consolidated and the Bingham school was no longer needed. After use as a school was discontinued, the building was used as a town hall and a community meeting center. It was restored in 1987.

== Description ==
The Bingham Schoolhouse #5 is a single story wood frame vernacular structure clad with clapboards. It consists of two connected blocks, each two bays wide by three bays deep, with several projecting gables sheltering entrances. The interior is divided into two rooms.
