= Glen Haven, Michigan =

- Unincorporated community
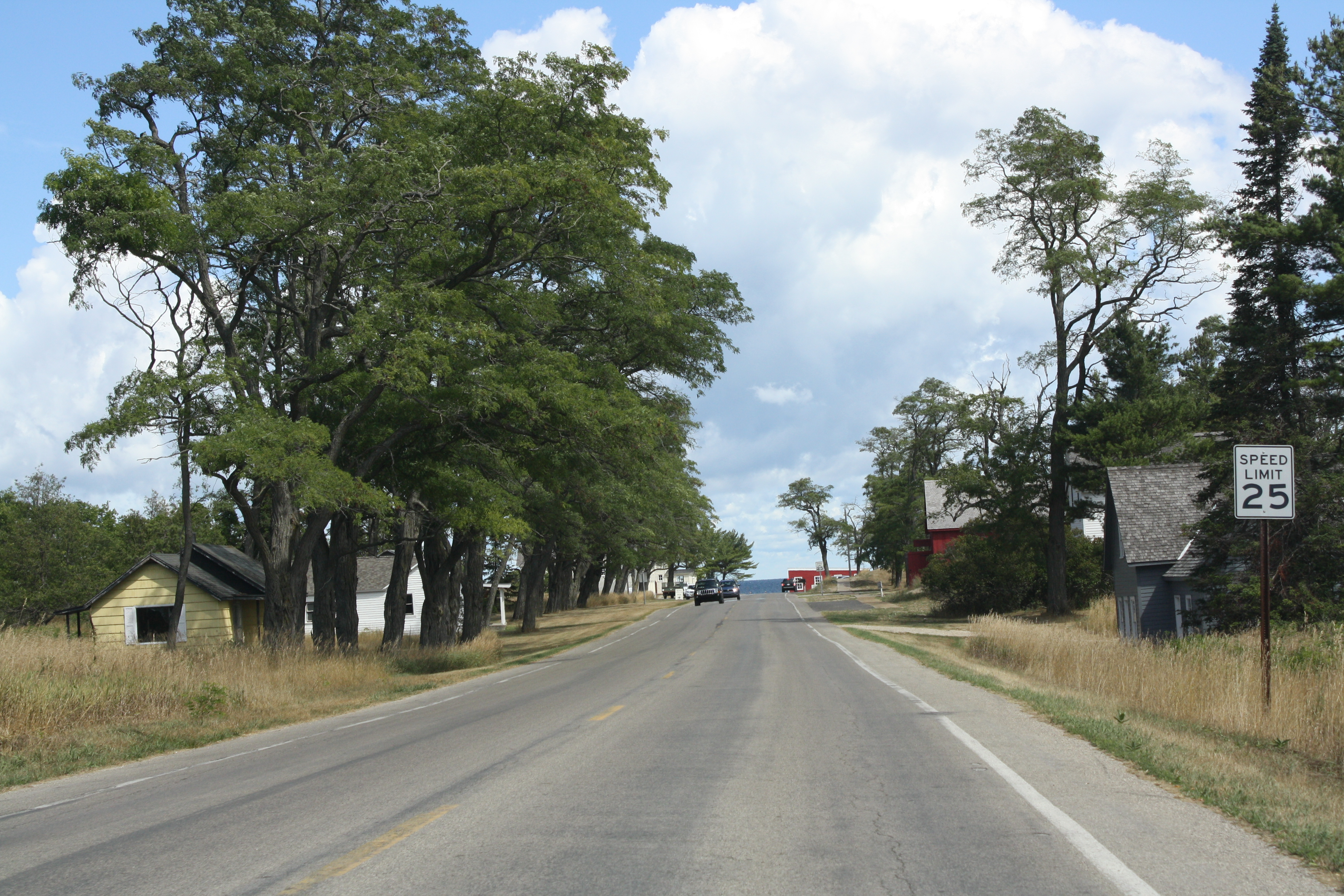
- Looking north on the former M-209

- Location within the state of Michigan
- Coordinates: 44°53′56″N 86°01′49″W
- Country: United States
- State: Michigan
- County: Leelanau
- Township: Glen Arbor
- Part of: Sleeping Bear Dunes National Lakeshore
- Settled: 1857 (Sleeping Bearville)

Government
  - Type: National Park Service
- Elevation: 598 ft (182 m)
- Time zone: UTC-5 (EST)
  - Summer (DST): UTC-4 (EDT)
- ZIP code(s): 49630
- Area code: 231
- Glen Haven Village Historic District
- U.S. National Register of Historic Places
- U.S. Historic district
- Area: 16 acres (6.5 ha)
- Built: 1857
- NRHP reference No.: 83000882
- Added to NRHP: June 24, 1983

Glen Haven is a restored port village on the shore of Lake Michigan on the Leelanau Peninsula within the now Sleeping Bear Dunes National Lakeshore. Attractions include the Lake Michigan beach, a restored General Store and Blacksmith Shop. The unincorporated community is located in Glen Arbor Township.

== History ==
Glen Haven, located on Sleeping Bear Bay, developed as a Lake Michigan deep water port to service shipping traffic with firewood, lumber and other supplies and services. In 1857, Glen Haven, was founded as a settlement called Sleeping Bearville when C. C. McCarty, brother-in-law of Glen Arbor pioneer John E. Fisher, built a saw mill and inn on the beach there. By 1881, there were 11 buildings in the community.

Over years the timberline receded away from the shore and steamer firewood became scarce. In 1878, an agent for the Northern Transportation company, David H. Day, was sent to Glen Haven to secure and maintain a source of firewood to feed the boilers of the company's steam ships. In 1881, Day bought NTC's properties, including the village of Glen Haven, using his savings and money borrowed from his friend Perry Hannah of Traverse City's Hannah & Lay Lumber Company, where he served briefly as manager. He established a lumber mill on a pond between Little Glen Lake and the current National Park sand dune climbing area. Timber was harvested from around the inland lakes and floated to the saw mill for processing. The timber products were brought to the Glen Haven port by a narrow gauge steam locomotive on tracks along the base of sand dunes. The tracks ended on a long dock where the wood products were loaded directly onto ships. (The dock poles can still be seen off the shore.)

The Sleeping Bear National Lakeshore was authorized by congress on October 21, 1970. The National Park Service (N.P.S.) acquired private properties within and outside the planned park boundary under eminent domain and condemnation court proceedings.

Also located in Glen Haven is the former Glen Haven Canning Co. building. This building was first used as a warehouse and later as a cannery for cherries in the 1920s. It has since been restored as the Cannery Boathouse Museum, housing historic small wooden boats used in the Manitou Passage between Glen Haven/Glen Arbor and the North and South Manitou Islands.

The former M-209, once the shortest state highway in Michigan, extended from M-109 to Sleeping Bear Dunes Road adjacent to the canning factory. (M-209 was turned back to Leelanau County control in 1995 and is no longer a state highway, although many still refer to it by its former route designation today.) To the west along the waterfront, Sleeping Bear Dunes Rd terminates in front of the former U.S. Coast Guard Life Saving Station, now restored as the Sleeping Bear Point Coast Guard Station Maritime Museum. The exhibits focus on the U.S. Life-Saving Service, the U.S. Coast Guard, and Great Lakes shipping history. In the summer, demonstrations are given of rescue drills and equipment used to fire a rescue line from shore more than 400 yards (370 m) to a ship in distress.

The Coast Guard lifesaving station was built in 1901 and moved to its present location in 1931 before closing in 1941. The Park Service purchased all of the village by the mid-1970s. The last resident, Carolyn Bumgardner, was evicted through eminent domain in November 2007 after a long battle to keep her property.

Sleeping Bear Dunes National Lakeshore is a United States National Lakeshore located on the "little finger" of the lower peninsula of Michigan in Leelanau and Benzie counties.

The park covers a 35-mile (56 km) stretch of Lake Michigan's eastern coastline, as well as North and South Manitou Islands. The park was established primarily for its outstanding natural features, including forests, beaches, dune formations, and ancient glacial phenomena. The Lakeshore also contains many cultural features including the 1871 South Manitou Island Lighthouse, three former Life-Saving Service/Coast Guard Stations and an extensive rural historic farm district.

== Images ==
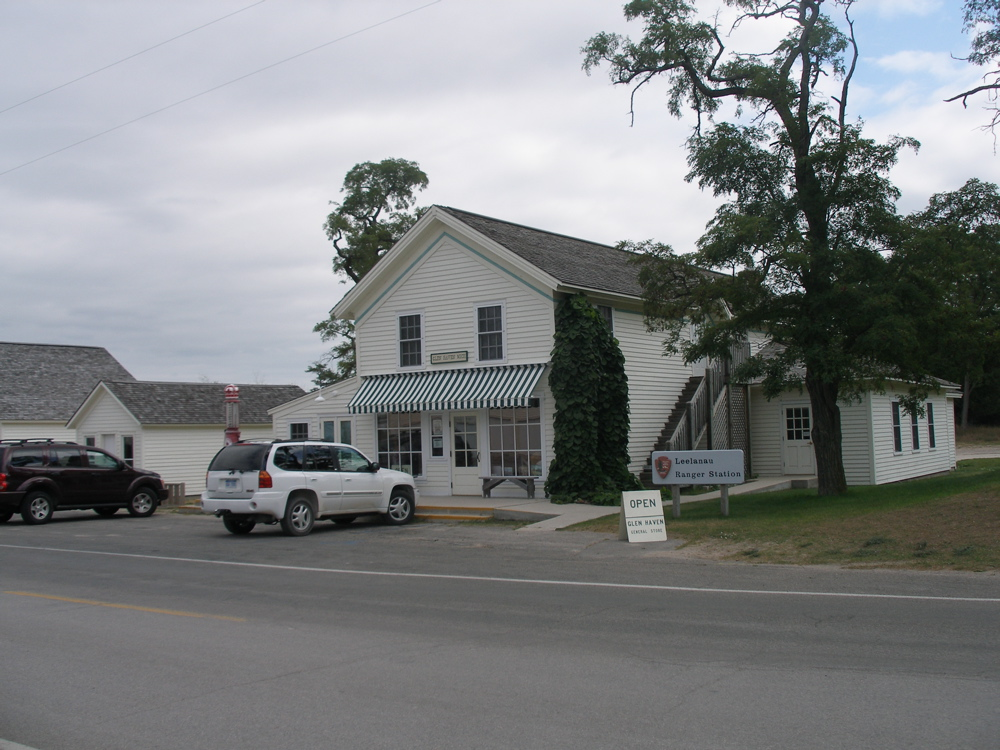
The D.H. Day General store in Glen Haven

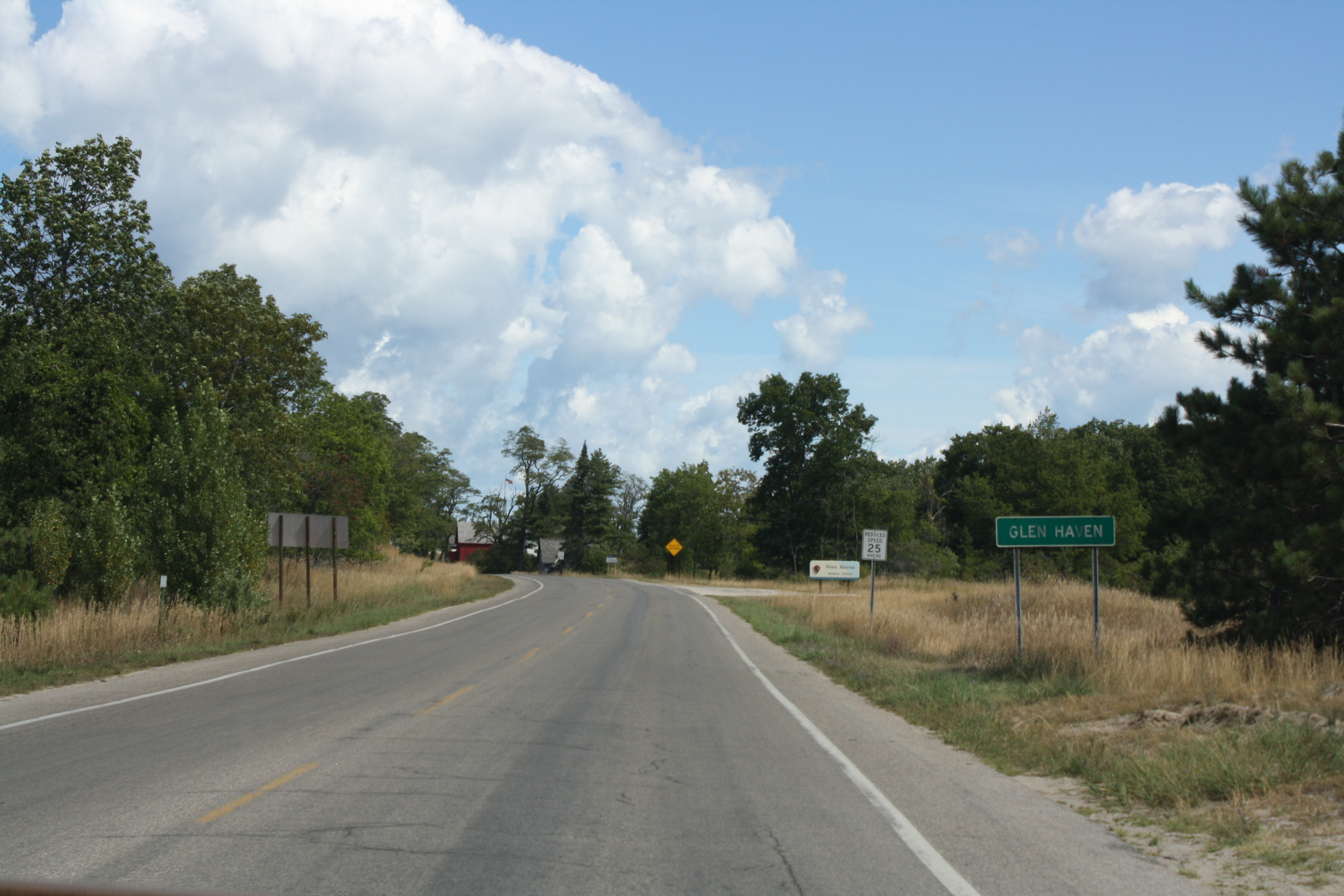
Looking north toward Glen Haven along Glen Haven Road (former M-209)

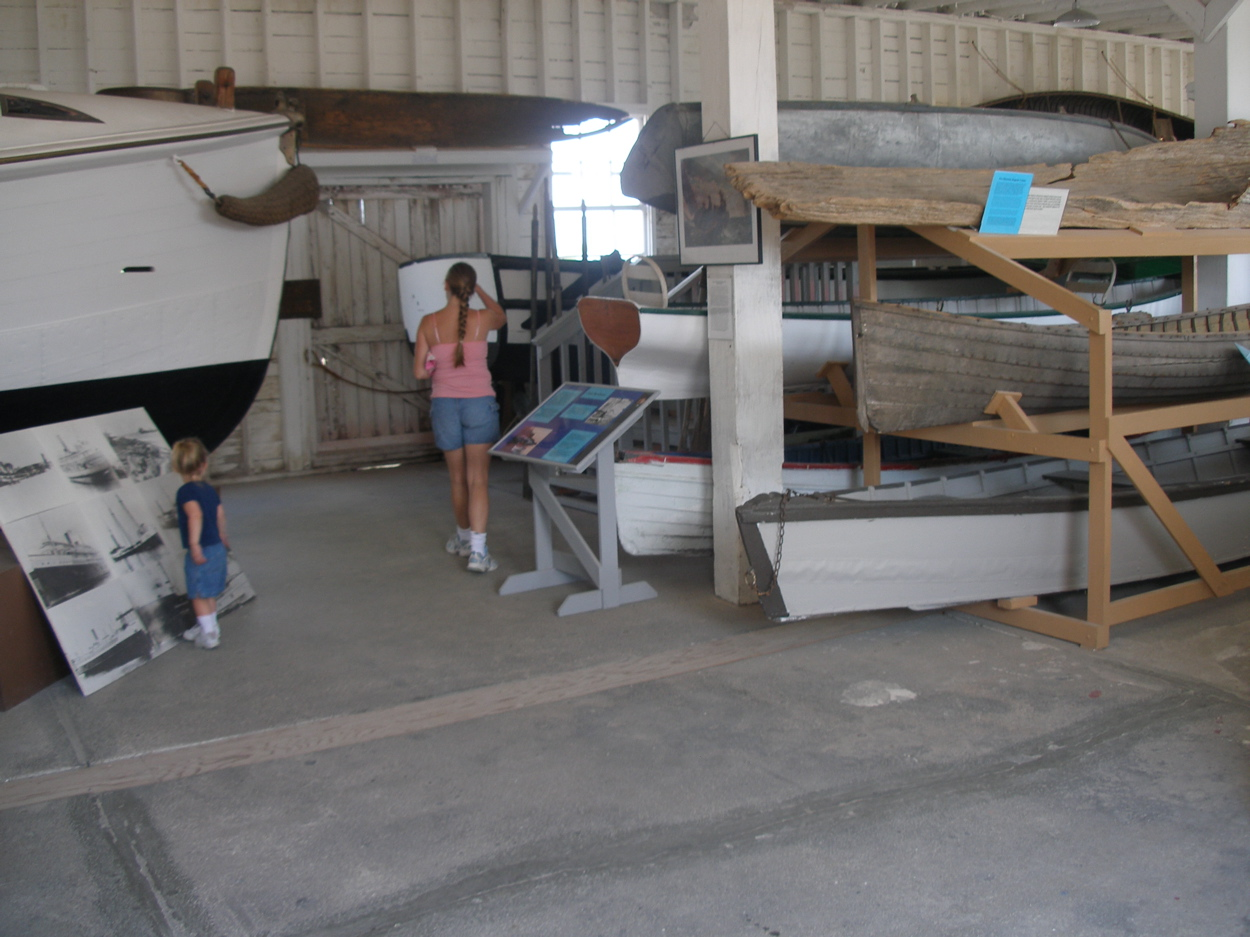
Inside the Cannery Boathouse Museum

== See also ==
- Coast Guard Museum Northwest
- Virginia Beach Surf & Rescue Museum
