= Pea bean =

Pea beans are several types of common food plants producing beans:

- Pea bean may refer to a variety of edible common bean (Phaseolus vulgaris) that has been recorded in Britain since the 16th century. The seeds are unusual in being strongly bicoloured (red-brown and white). The plants are a typical climbing bean. The beans are either eaten in the pod like French beans or they may be harvested when mature and eaten as other dried beans. Many seed catalogues list it as Phaseolus aegypticus - a name unrecorded in the botanical literature. There have been other assertions that it is a form of lablab but horticultural consensus places it simply as a variety of Phaseolus vulgaris, closely related to French beans and haricot beans.
- In the US, pea bean or white pea beans is also used to describe small white common beans (Phaseolus vulgaris). The term may be used for navy beans, which came from the fact that the U.S. Navy relied heavily on these to feed sailors in the 19th century. These beans are considered to be healthy and are often used in pies and soups.
- The same name is used for Vigna unguiculata subsp. sesquipedalis, also called yard-long bean and cowpea.
