= Glen Arbor Township, Michigan =

- Civil township
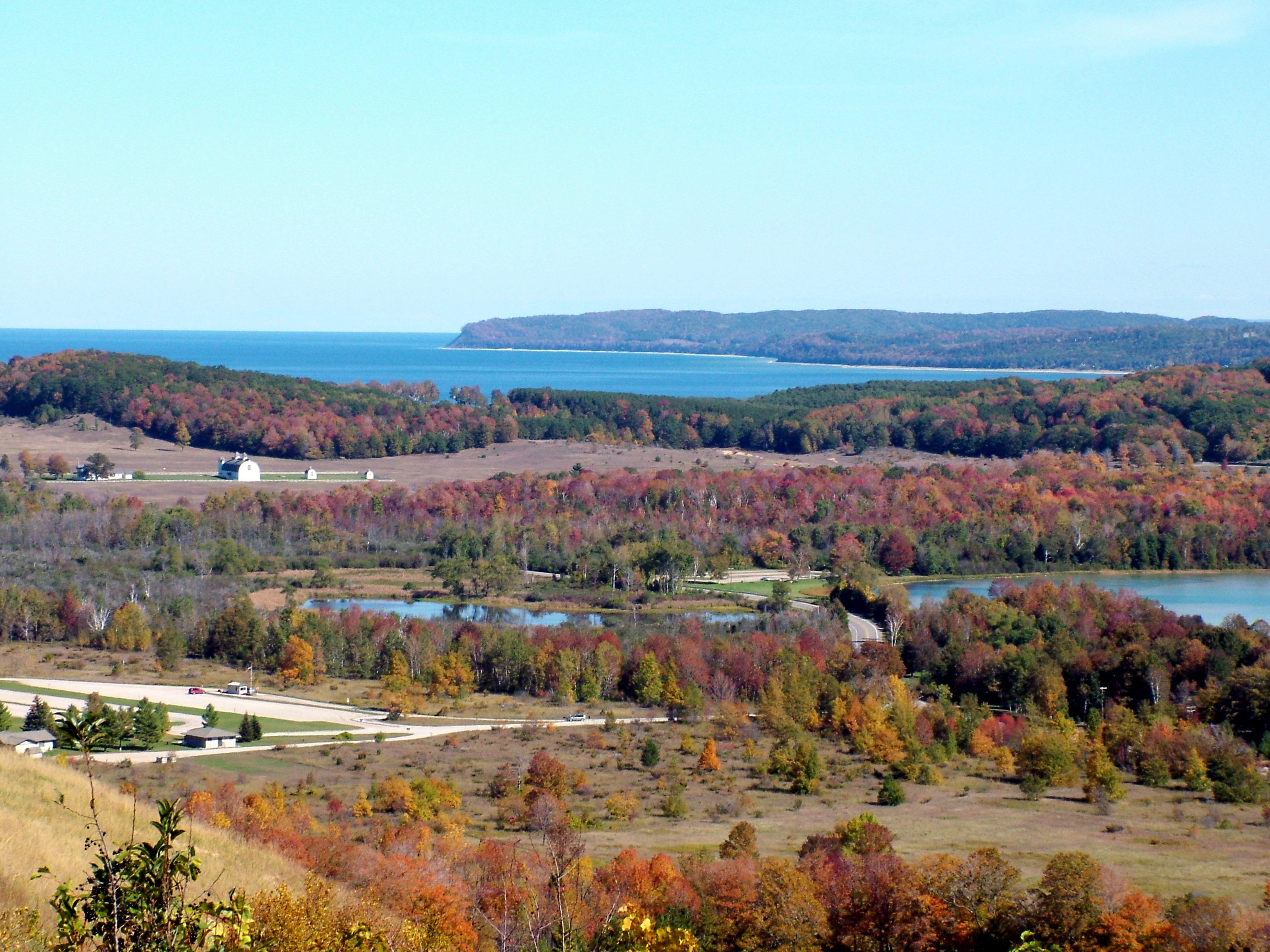
- Rolling terrain of Glen Arbor Township, with Lake Michigan in the background

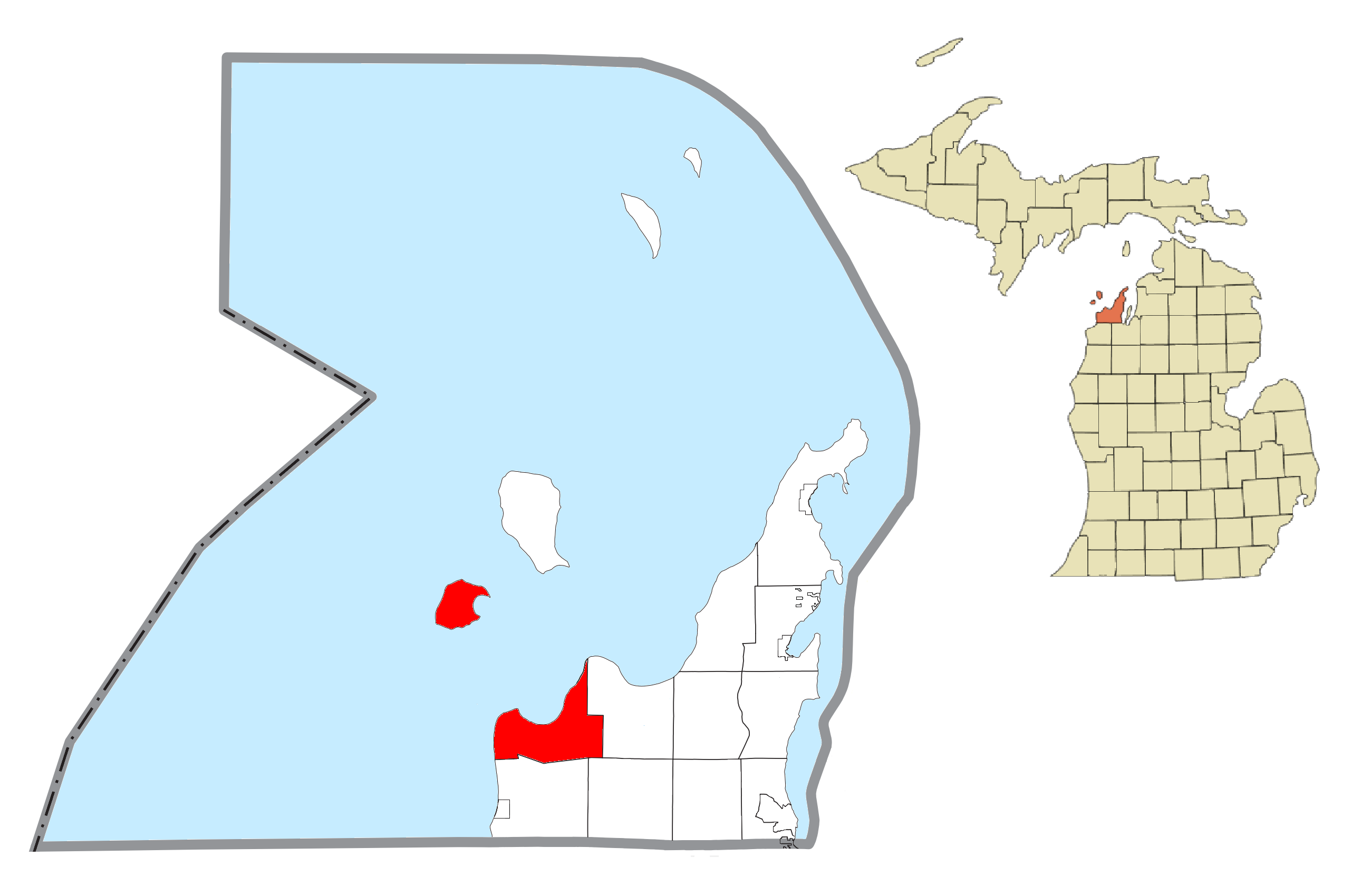
- Location within Leelanau County

- Location within the state of Michigan Glen Arbor Township (the United States)
- Coordinates: 44°53′46″N 85°59′54″W
- Country: United States
- State: Michigan
- County: Leelanau

Area
  - Total: 87.6 sq mi (226.8 km^{2})
  - Land: 28.6 sq mi (74.0 km^{2})
  - Water: 59.0 sq mi (152.8 km^{2})
- Elevation: 581 ft (177 m)

Population (2020)
  - Total: 757
  - Density: 26.5/sq mi (10.2/km^{2})
- Time zone: UTC-5 (Eastern (EST))
  - Summer (DST): UTC-4 (EDT)
- ZIP code(s): 49630 (Empire; 49636 (Glen Arbor); 49664 (Maple City)
- Area code: 231
- FIPS code: 26-32380
- GNIS feature ID: 1626359

Glen Arbor Township is a civil township of Leelanau County in the U.S. state of Michigan. The population was 757 at the 2020 census. However, the population of the town expands rapidly during the summer months as a result of it being a summer colony.

The community of Glen Arbor, which is considered a census-designated place for statistical purposes, is located in the township. South Manitou Island is politically part of the township.

== History ==
John LaRue moved from South Manitou Island to the area of the Sleeping Bear Bay that would eventually become the town in 1848. After establishing a trading post, subsequent settlers began to move to the area with one, Mrs. John E. Fisher, giving the town the name "Glen Arbor" in 1854. Other prominent settlers were John Dorsey, who set up a cooper shop, and C.C. McCarty, who built the Sleeping Bear Inn, originally as a residence for lumbermen. Additionally, George Ray built a dock in 1856 and became the settlement's first postmaster and W. D. Burdick established a sawmill and grist mill nearby in 1864. In 1878, D. H. Day, a land developer and agent for the Northern Transportation Company, took interest in Glen Arbor. Day serves as the namesake for the historic barn that sits opposite of the Sleeping Bear Dunes.

The town's economy was largely based around the lumber industry in the mid 19th century. Wood became the first commodity of Leelanau County as it was used for constructing houses and for fueling the steamers that traversed the Great Lakes. The increase of maritime traffic and the constant threat of shipwrecks along the Manitou Passage led the U.S. Life-Saving Service to establish a small boat station at Sleeping Bear Point in 1901. In 1931, the U.S. Coast Guard moved the facility eastward to its present location near Glen Haven, then closed it in 1944. The station is now a maritime museum that is run by the National Park Service.

The size of the town has gradually risen over the years with many summer homes and resorts having been constructed. The primary industry of the town today, especially in the summer months, is tourism.

== Geography ==
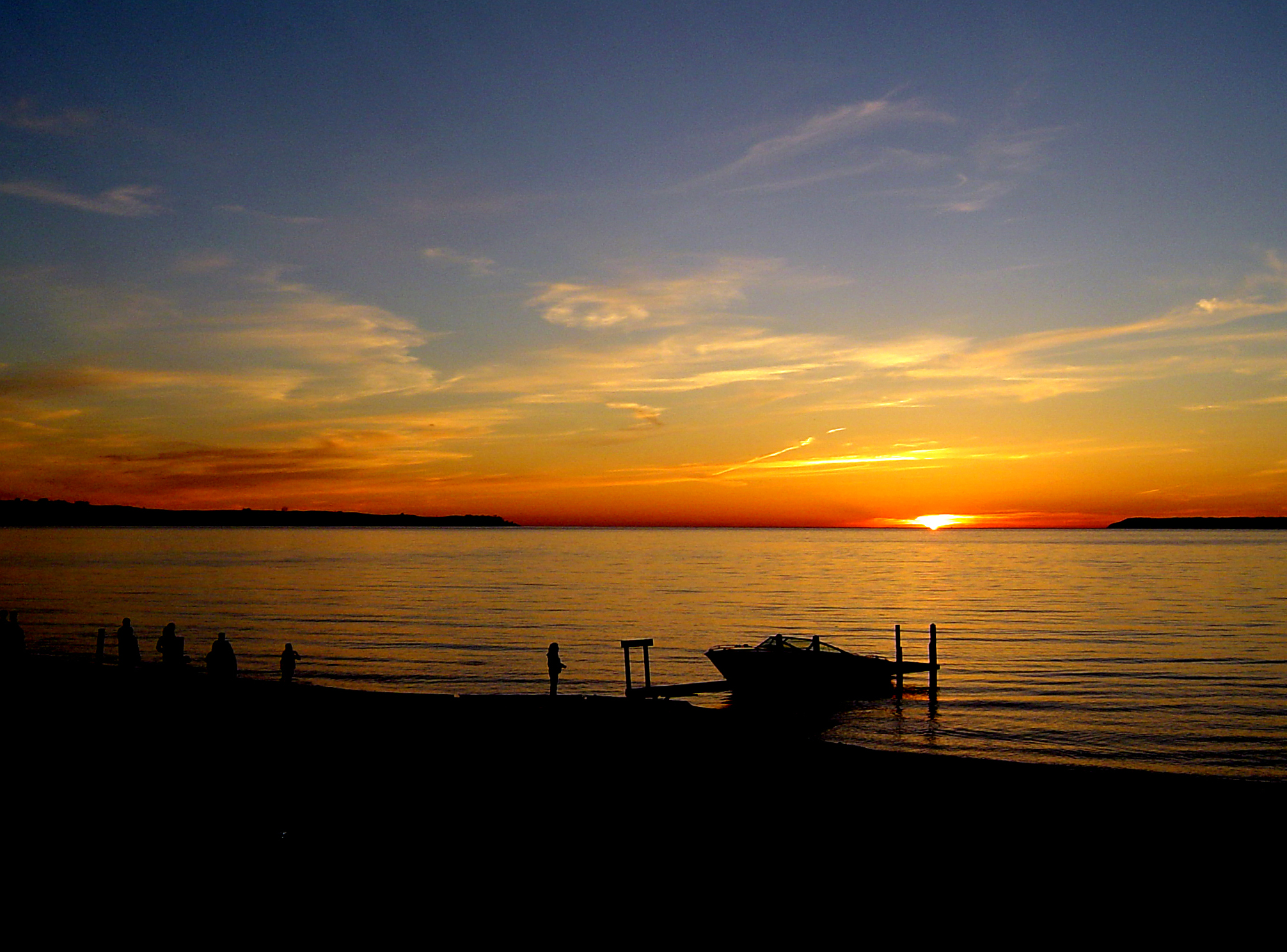
A sunset and South Manitou Island as seen from Glen Arbor

According to the United States Census Bureau, the township has a total area of 87.6 square miles (227 km^{2}), of which 28.6 square miles (74 km^{2}) is land and 59.0 square miles (153 km^{2}) (67.34%) is water. Glen Arbor Township is located along the Sleeping Bear Dunes National Lakeshore, which in 2011 was named the "Most Beautiful Place in America" by Good Morning America. The town is bordered by Glen Lake to its East and Lake Michigan to its West. Glen Lake is a popular destination for tourists due to its warm turquoise blue waters. The 6.3 mile long Crystal River (Michigan) passes through many points of the township during its duration which spans from Glen Lake to Lake Michigan. The river is popular among fly fisherman and kayakers who enjoy its clear water and pristine wildlife.

South Manitou Island is administered by the National Park Service, but is politically part of Glen Arbor Township.

=== Major highways ===
- M-22 enters the township from the south before turning east in downtown Glen Arbor.
- M-109 enters the township from the west, terminating at a junction with M-22 in Glen Arbor.

== Communities ==
- Glen Arbor is a census-designated place and is the center of population for the township.
- Glen Haven is a historical unincorporated community west of Glen Arbor.

== Education ==
Glen Arbor is home to the private Leelanau School.
