= South Manitou Island Lighthouse =

Lighthouse in Michigan, United States

South Manitou Island Light
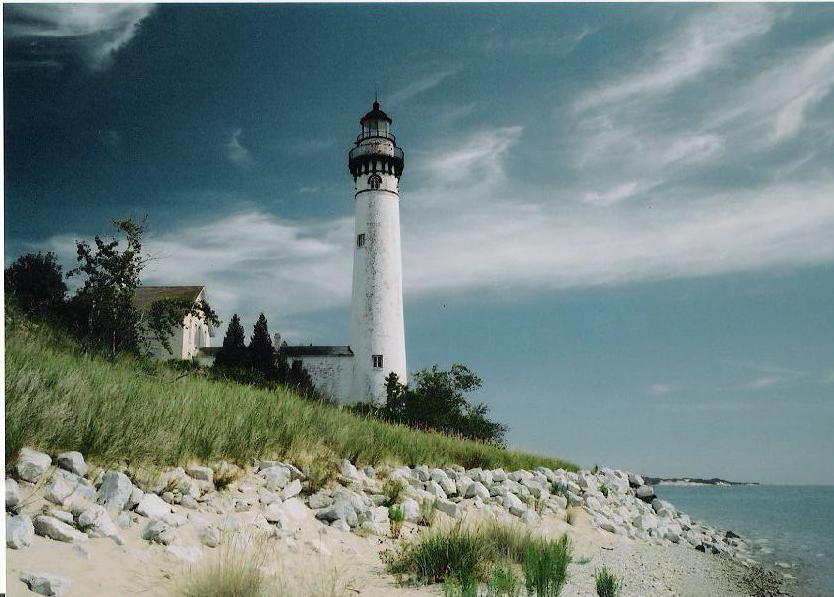
- South Manitou Island Lighthouse
- Location: South Manitou Island, Michigan
- Coordinates: 45°00′27.654″N 86°05′37.62″W

Tower
- Constructed: 1840
- Foundation: Oak pilings, cut limestone
- Construction: Brick and masonry, Italianate bracketing
- Height: 65 feet (20 m)
- Shape: Conical
- Markings: white w/black trim and lantern
- Heritage: National Register of Historic Places listed place, Michigan State Historic Site

Light
- First lit: 1840
- Deactivated: 1958
- Focal height: 104 feet (32 m)
- Lens: Third order Fresnel lens
- Characteristic: F W
- South Manitou Island Lighthouse Complex and Life Saving Station Historical District
- U.S. National Register of Historic Places
- U.S. Historic district
- Michigan State Historic Site
- Area: 47 acres (19 ha)
- Built: 1872
- NRHP reference No.: 83003782

Significant dates
- Added to NRHP: October 28, 1983
- Designated MSHS: September 21, 1976

South Manitou Island Lighthouse is located on South Manitou Island in Lake Michigan, 16 miles (26 km) west of Leland, Michigan. It is in Leelanau County in western Northern Michigan.

== History ==
This is the third lighthouse built on the island. Construction of the first began in 1839 and the 1 1/2-story lighthouse with a lens in the cupola first went on in 1840, under the care of lighthouse keeper William N. Burton, who had a thriving lumbering business. It had a Lewis lamp, which was upgraded to a fourth order Fresnel lens /freɪˈnɛl/. Deterioration of the building led to the lighthouse being completely rebuilt in 1858. Over time this light was found to be deficient, and the current lighthouse was built in 1872. With a third order Fresnel lens sitting 91 feet (28 m) above the foundation, this light had a focal plane of 104 feet (32 m). The site is under the control of the National Park Service, in conjunction with the Sleeping Bear Dunes National Lakeshore. It is listed in the National Register of Historic Places. The lighthouse was decommissioned in 1958, and is now a museum. It is not operational.

"The lighthouse on South Manitou Island is, or was while it was still in operation, perhaps the most beautiful on the Great Lakes,"

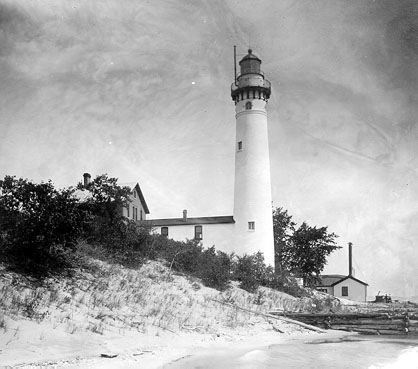
Undated USCG photo

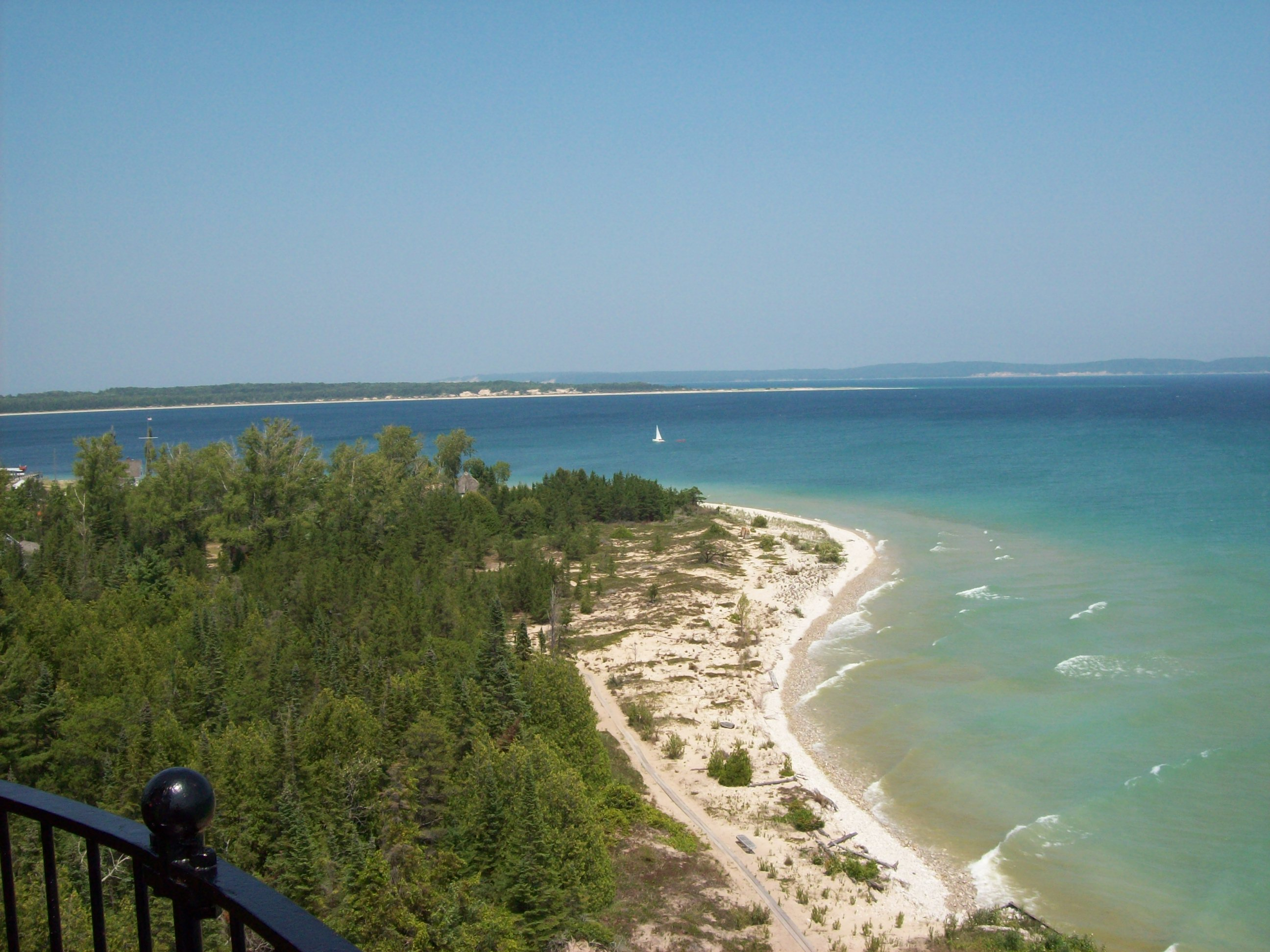
The view from the lighthouse catwalk looking Northeast

Guide Emily McKinney stated: "You're not only looking at Lake Michigan out there, you're looking at the Manitou Passage," she said. "It's a big stretch of water between the Straits of Mackinac in Chicago, 300 miles (480 km). If you use you imagination, take yourselves back 150 years ago." The passage was preferred as safer than being on the open lake—so much so that 1,000 ships passed each day, carrying people and commerce—the passageway nonetheless was treacherous.

Congress appropriated $5,000 for a South Manitou Island light in 1838. A report to the Secretary of the Treasury noted that the island offered shelter from storms and fuel for steamships. The report opined that it was the only all-weather harbor admitting large vessels in the 300 mile direct route from the Straits of Mackinac to Chicago. For those in storms, the sight of the beacon would have been a magnificent one, McKinney says. "Before the light went on, a man who had been in a boat on a storm-tossed lake in the area of South Manitou recounted the sense of terror he felt. It might have been different after the light's construction, McKinney summed up: "All these people on the boat, scared and frightened, look up and see a 100-foot-tall (30 m) whitewashed tower with that white light, shining on the lake. It would have looked just like an angel."

The light has been the site of a number of accidents and fatalities. Keeper Aaron Sheridan, his wife and their infant on March 15, 1878, died in a boating accident near the light. The Three Brothers shipwreck is within sight of the light.

The Manitou Island Memorial Society has been formed to preserve, protect, restore and "relight the light" on South Manitou Island and elsewhere. The dwelling's inside is closed and covered with graffiti. Current fundraising efforts are directed to removing the graffiti and repairing the lighthouse buildings. In the 1980s the tower's foundation was reinforced to protect it from erosion at a time of high lake levels which threatened to topple the structure. Today, the tower is open and guides offer tours.

The Park Service restored the lantern room and the tower's spiral staircase in the summer of 2008, and a replica of the light's original third-order Fresnel lens was installed in the lantern late that fall. The light was reactivated in May 2009 and it is lit from May to November.

== See also ==
- Lighthouses in the United States
