= South Manitou Island =

Island in Michigan

- Location within Michigan

Geography
- Location: Lake Michigan, Sleeping Bear Dunes National Lakeshore
- Coordinates: 45°1′40″N 86°7′10″W
- Area: 8.2 sq mi (21 km^{2})
- Highest elevation: 610 ft (186 m)

Administration
- United States
- State: Michigan
- County: Leelanau County
- Township: Glen Arbor Township

Demographics
- Population: Uninhabited

South Manitou Island (/ˈmænətu/ MAN-ə-too) is located in Lake Michigan, approximately 16 miles (26 km) west of Leland, Michigan. It is part of Leelanau County and the Sleeping Bear Dunes National Lakeshore. The uninhabited island is 8.277 sq mi (21.44 km^{2}) in land area and can be accessed by a ferry service from Leland. Guided tours on open-air vehicles are available to visitors, but most traffic is on foot. Larger North Manitou Island lies to its north.

The island is 3 miles (4.8 km) wide and 3 miles (4.8 km) long. It is part of an island chain that extends north to the Straits of Mackinac. The island consists of a ridge of tilted layers of limestone, buried under a blanket of glacial debris. Glaciers carved out the Lake Michigan basin. When the basin filled with water, the peaks of the ridge remained exposed as islands. During post-glacial times, winds blowing on the high, sandy bluffs on the west side of the island moved sand inland, forming sand dunes. Florence Lake is the island's only inland lake. The island has a system of trails and campsites.

A growth of Northern white cedars on the southwestern corner of the island are among the oldest and largest in the world. The largest is 18 ft (5.5 m) around and is estimated to be over 500 years old.

== History ==
South Manitou Island was originally settled in the mid-1830s by William Burton to provide cord wood to fuel the Great Lakes steamships. His dock was built in the middle of the crescent-shaped bay on the eastern side of the island, which offered the only natural deep-water harbor between Chicago and Buffalo. In 1847, the village included Burton's Wharf, a house, blacksmith shop, grocery store, barn, and a wooden tamarack railroad track extending from the dock inland to haul wood for the steamers. When the first post office opened in 1870, it was located here. When logging operations ended and the dock fell into disrepair, the original island village dwindled in size and importance. Burdick's moved their general store from its original location near the old dock to a site near the Lifesaving station in 1923 on the southeastern shore, and that marked the shift of the island community to the current village site located at the present dock where the passenger ferry arrives.

Farming developed slowly on the island, but by 1870 most islanders were self-sufficient farmers. Surplus crops were sold to passing ships and mainland markets. The isolation of the island provided an ideal environment for growing prize-winning rye, beans and peas. Today, there are no active farms on the island; farm buildings, abandoned machinery, the old school and cemetery are reminders of the past. The island is now uninhabited, and most of its buildings lie in ruins.

== Lighthouse and Life-Saving Service Station ==
South Manitou Island was popular in the 19th and 20th centuries as a harbor and fueling station. With the completion of the Erie Canal in 1826, the development of commercial navigation on the Great Lakes increased rapidly. The Manitou Passage was the most important route for schooners and steamers traveling the 300 mile length of Lake Michigan. The island was a stop for early mariners between Chicago and the Straits of Mackinac.

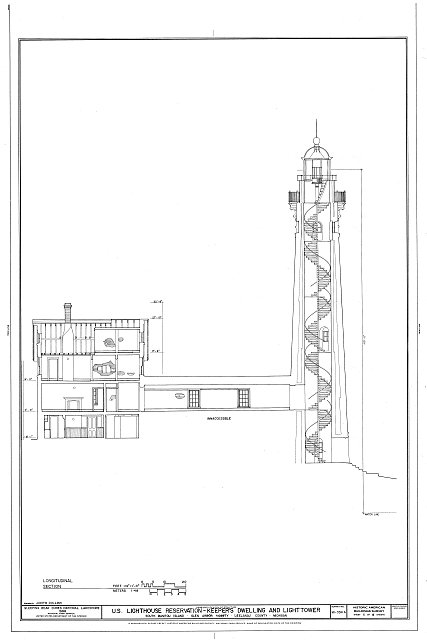
South Manitou Island Light Blueprint

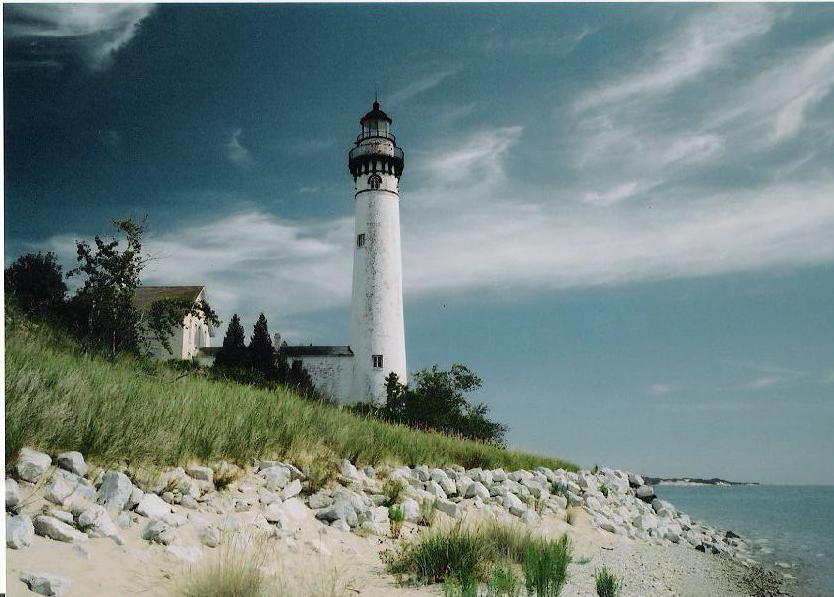
The lighthouse on South Manitou Island, built in 1871.

To guide storm-driven ships, Congress appropriated $5,000 in 1838 for the construction of a lighthouse. Construction began in 1839, but very little is known about this first lighthouse on South Manitou Island. The specifications were the same as for the Old Presque Isle lighthouse, which included a 30-foot circular tower and a stone keeper's dwelling, but written accounts describe a 1 1/2-story house with a light tower on one gable end. No sketches or photos exist to determine what was actually built. The location of the light was on a 30-foot sandy knoll near the shore close to the location of the present lighthouse, but the exact location is not known.

In 1858, the U.S. Lighthouse Establishment recognized the need for greater safety and replaced this house with a two-story brick residence with a 35-foot tower on top. The tower housed a Fourth Order Fresnel lens. A fog signal building was added and both structures still stand today.

The increased shipping traffic brought changes and in 1871, a 100-foot tower was built. The tower is 18 feet in diameter at the base. The walls are hollow and 5 feet thick at the base tapering to 3 feet thick at the top. A passageway was added connecting the tower to the keeper's dwelling. A Third Order Fresnel lens from Paris was installed with a 3-wick lamp that had a range of 18 miles. In 1875, the first steam fog signal on Lake Michigan was installed replacing the fog bell. The 100 foot lighthouse was in operation from 1871 to 1958. The lighthouse is still in good condition. Recent efforts have restored its light tower to operational status for the summer months.

In 1901, the United States Life-Saving Service built a station on the island. The USLSS became part of the United States Coast Guard in 1915. The station was permanently closed in 1958. This station is now the island's ranger station and is not open to the public.

== Shipwrecks ==
Map of South Manitou Island.

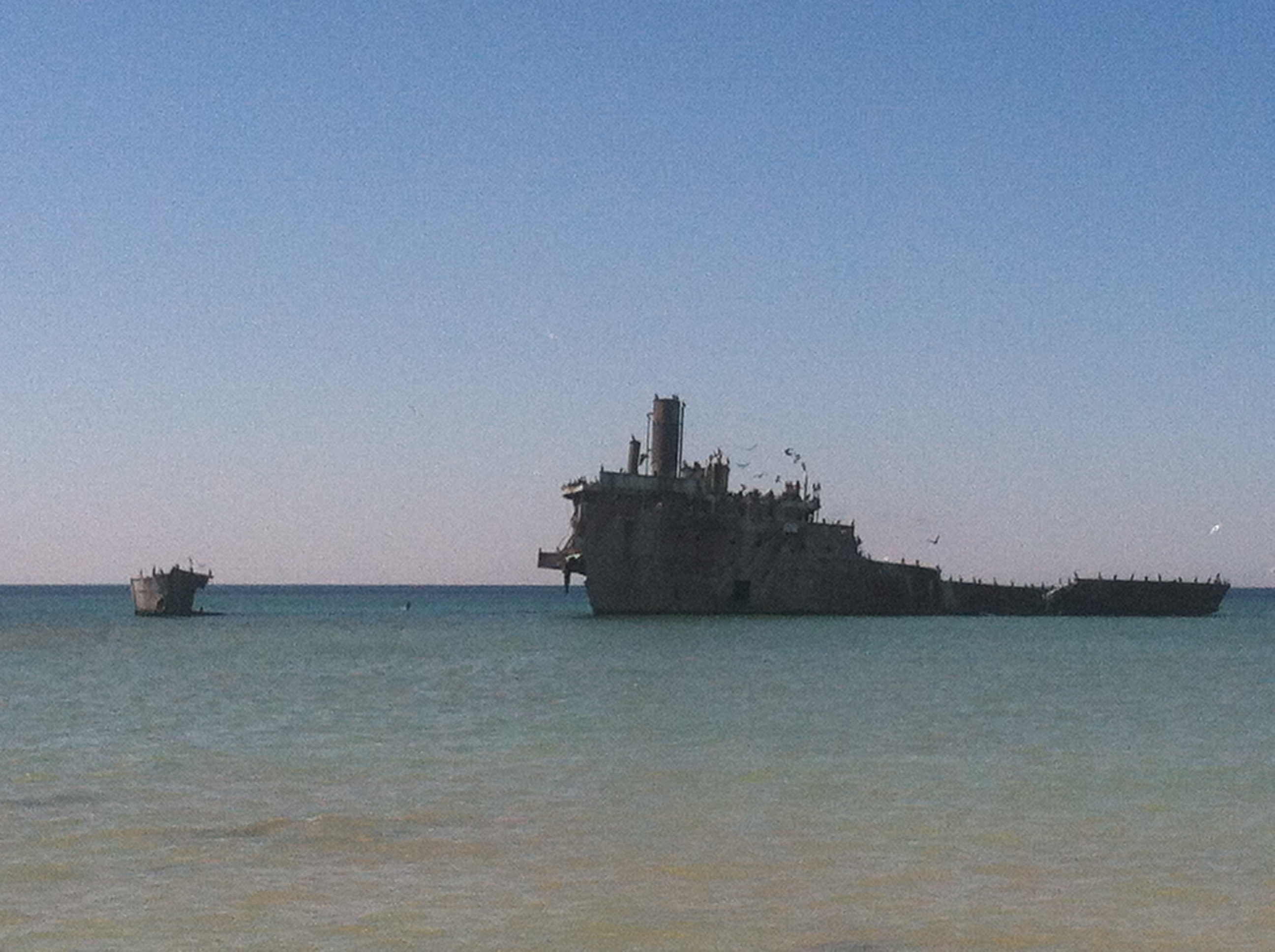
Francisco Morazan shipwreck.

The Manitou islands are surrounded by over 50 known shipwreck sites, some of which are popular diving spots. A preserve was established in 1988 to conserve the historic and archeological value of the fifty known shipwreck sites, dating from 1835 to 1960. One such shipwreck is the Francisco Morazan, which grounded and became a total loss in 1960 off the south shore of the island. She ran over the wreck of the bulk freighter Walter L Frost, stranded November 4, 1903, with a cargo of corn and general merchandise.

The eastern side of the island is dominated by a large round bay. This bay is deep until very close to shore. On more than one occasion, ships found here a safe port in a storm, even some of the large bulk carriers. During the "Big Blow" of 1913, Captain John Stufflebeam nosed the bow of the passenger/packet steamer Illinois up onto the beach. He kept the engines going full for 49 hours so the wind would not blow the vessel back out to sea, until he was able to send two seamen ashore to fasten to a stout tree. When the storm abated 24 hours later, he untied from the tree, put his engines in reverse and backed away from shore to proceed safely on his journey.
