= Fennville, Michigan =

- City
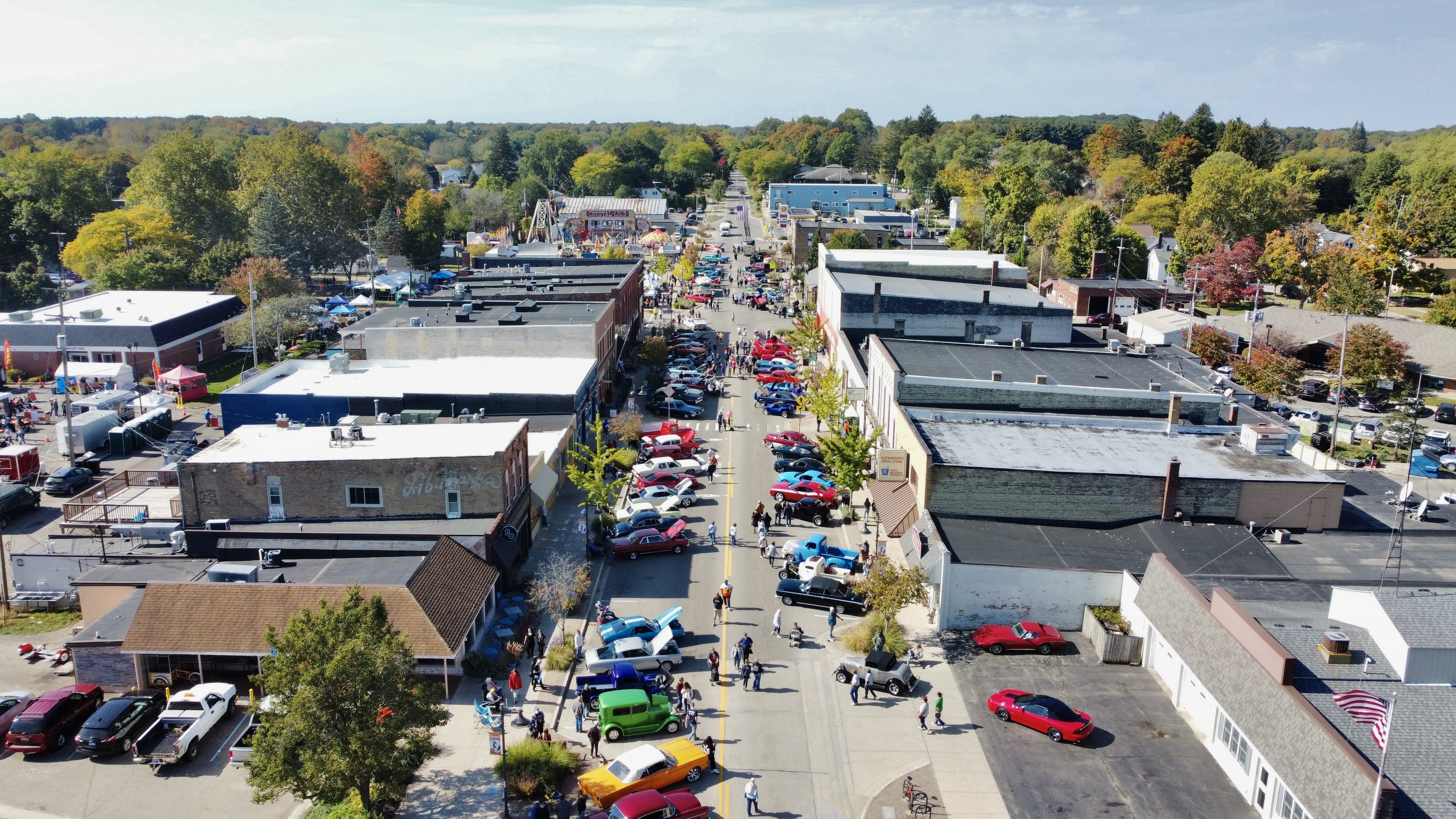
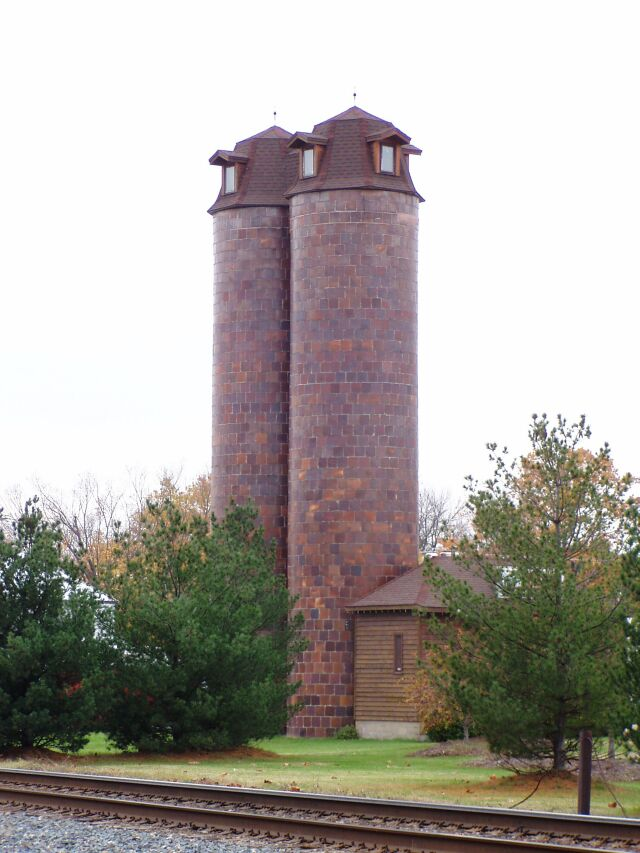
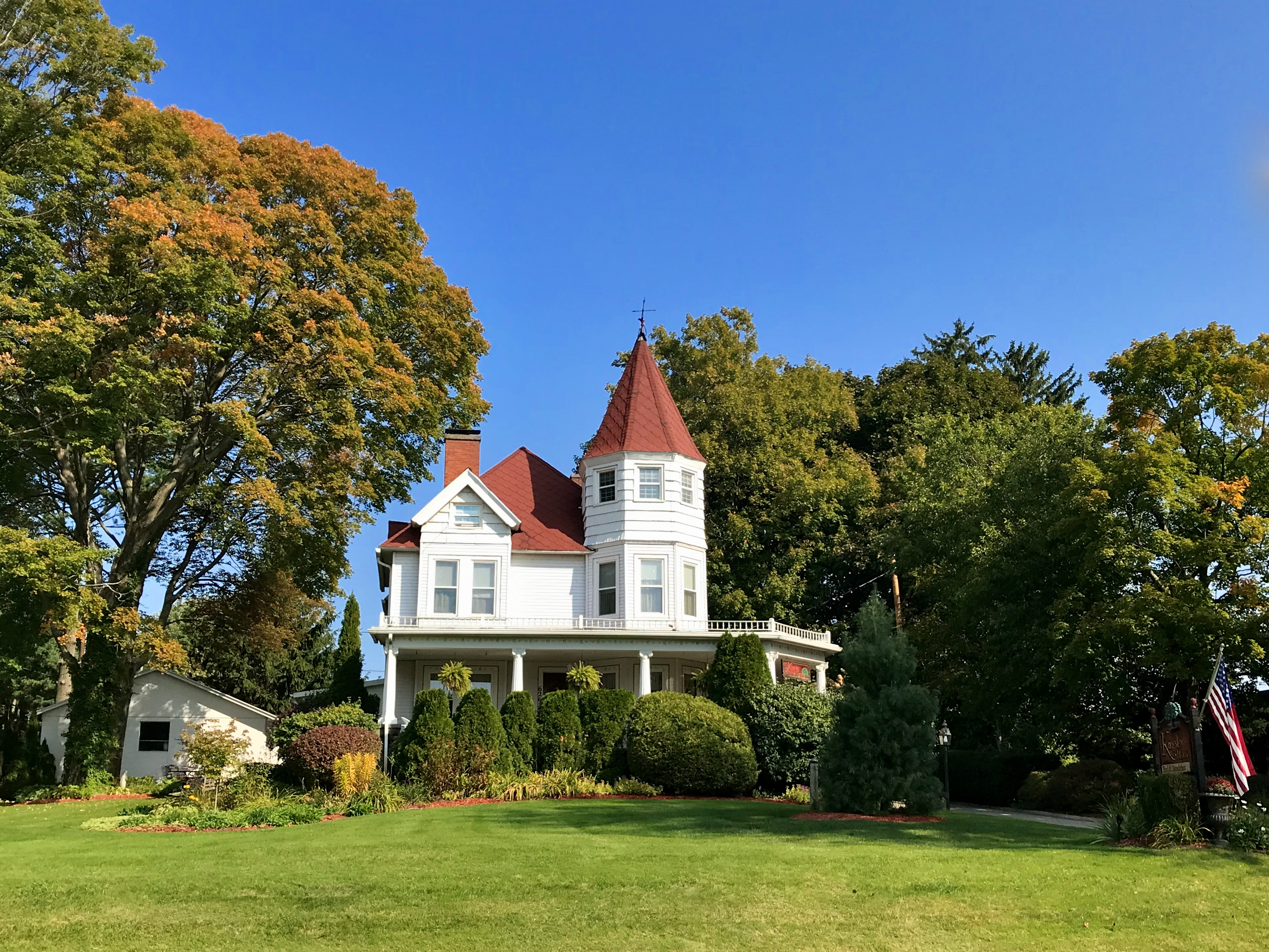
- Main Street during the Goose Festival Historic grain silos Kingsley House

- Logo

- Location of Fennville, Michigan
- Coordinates: 42°35′40.98″N 86°6′18.75″W
- Country: United States
- State: Michigan
- County: Allegan

Government
  - Mayor: Carlos Lopez
  - City Administrator: Kathryn Beemer

Area
  - Total: 1.10 sq mi (2.85 km^{2})
  - Land: 1.09 sq mi (2.83 km^{2})
  - Water: 0.012 sq mi (0.03 km^{2})
- Elevation: 666 ft (203 m)

Population (2020)
  - Total: 1,745
  - Density: 1,599/sq mi (617.3/km^{2})
- Time zone: UTC-5 (Eastern (EST))
  - Summer (DST): UTC-4 (EDT)
- ZIP code: 49408
- Area code: 269
- FIPS code: 26-27740
- GNIS feature ID: 1626274
- Website: www.fennville.gov

Fennville is a city in Allegan County in the U.S. state of Michigan. The population was 1,745 at the 2020 census. Located on M-89 on the boundary between Manlius Township to the north and Clyde Township to the south, Fennville is located about 11 miles (18 km) southeast of the city of Saugatuck and about 13 miles (21 km) west-northwest of the city of Allegan. It is about 13 miles (21 km) south of Holland, about 16 miles (26 km) northeast of South Haven and roughly 40 miles (64 km) miles southwest of Grand Rapids.

Initially settled in the mid-nineteenth century, the settlement was established on the perimeter of a swamp until the town was destroyed by fire in 1871. Following the creation of the Chicago and Michigan Lake Shore Railroad in the late nineteenth century, the settlement grew into an agricultural village. In the mid-twentieth century, Fennville became a city and experienced growth following the construction of Interstate 196. Towards the closing of the twentieth century, Fennville began to establish itself as an agritourism destination following the creation of the Fennville AVA for the local wine industry. Into the twenty-first century, Fennville experienced consistent population growth.

== History ==
=== 1800s ===
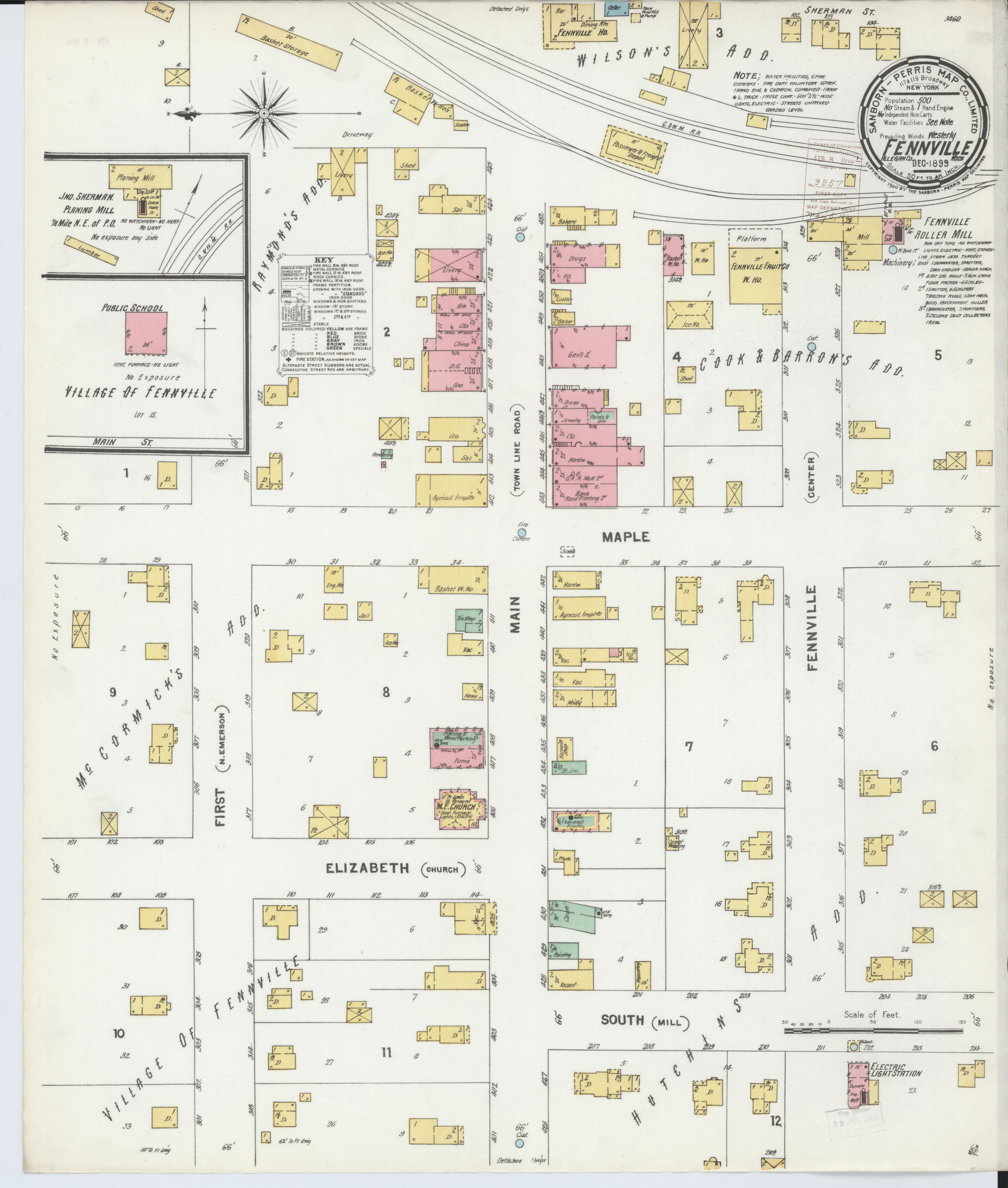
Map of Fennville in 1899

The place where Fennville is now located was originally a small settlement at a crossing of two wood roads. The first road was built by Harrison Hutchins and James McCormick in 1837. Elam Atwater Fenn from the state of New York entered the nearby place of Manlius in 1851.

The story of how Fennville received its name is that Fenn built a sawmill nearby in 1860. This led to people referring to the settlement as "Fenn's Mill" which became the name associated with the post office there. Some early documents pluralized "Mill" to render "Fenn's Mills. In the 1860s, Fennville had a swamp in the middle of the town and buildings were located on higher ground on the perimeter. A fire that may have been from the Great Chicago Fire or the Great Michigan Fire destroyed the town in 1871.

After the town was rebuilt, the Chicago and Michigan Lake Shore Railroad constructed a train station. The railroad named the town Fennville with help of citizens in the town. Towards the end of the 1800s, farmers drained the swamp in the middle of Fennville. On February 20, 1889, Fennville was officially made a village.

=== 1900s ===
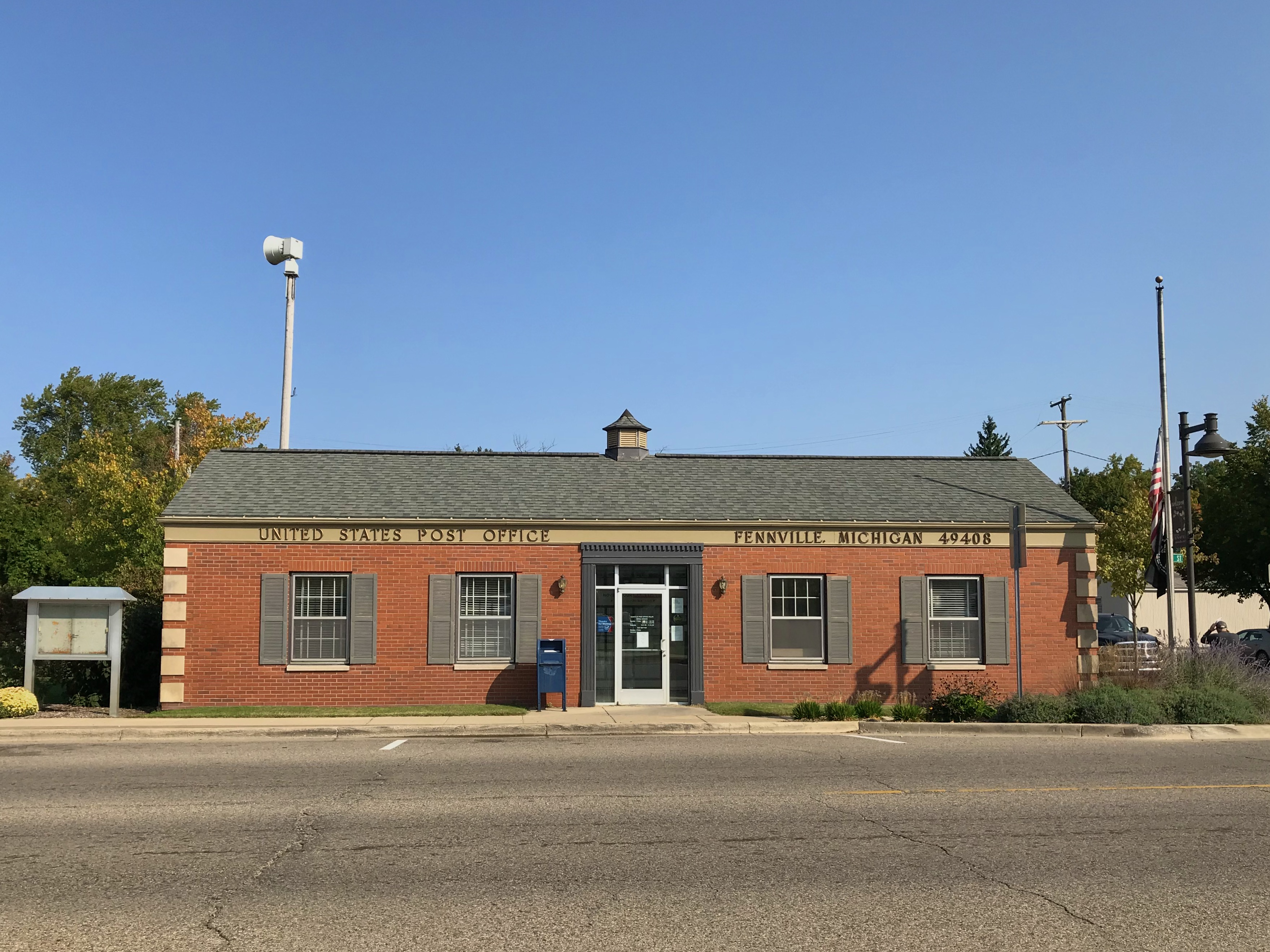
United States Post Office in Fennville

The landmark Stevens Hotel was built downtown in 1910. In the beginning of the 1920s, the train station became busy with transporting farm products like fruit and mint. The village faced trouble with the economy in the 1930s during the Great Depression like other places at the time.

The village began to grow in the 1950s and 1960s following the construction of the nearby Interstate 196 of the then recently-established Interstate Highway System. The Hispanic community also started to grow as the village became larger and continued to experience growth into the next century. Fennville was officially made a city in 1961.

The United States Department of the Treasury named Fennville an American Viticultural Area (AVA) in 1981. After Fennville was named an AVA, wine from the city became popular and Fennville wineries were recognized with awards.

=== 2000s ===
In the 2010s, the city was provided a grant by the state of Michigan to make improvements for downtown walkability.

During the COVID-19 pandemic in 2020, the historic Stevens Hotel was closed. In 2025, Fennville began the construction of City Square Park, a $1 million project which will include an amphitheater, an outdoor fireplace and splash pad fountains. In June 2025, the Conagra Brands food facility, which had been producing food goods for nearly a century, was closed and 85 workers lost their jobs. In late 2025, a groundbreaking occurred for the Wine Trail Inn, located in the former Stevens Hotel building.

== Geography ==
According to the United States Census Bureau, the city has a total area of 1.11 square miles (2.87 km^{2}), of which 1.10 square miles (2.85 km^{2}) is land and 0.01 square miles (0.03 km^{2}) is water.

== Demographics ==
Historical population
Census	Pop.	Note	%±
1890	360		—
1900	454		26.1%
1910	533		17.4%
1920	547		2.6%
1930	622		13.7%
1940	643		3.4%
1950	639		−0.6%
1960	705		10.3%
1970	811		15.0%
1980	934		15.2%
1990	1,023		9.5%
2000	1,459		42.6%
2010	1,398		−4.2%
2020	1,745		24.8%
U.S. Decennial Census

=== 2020 census ===
As of the 2020 census, Fennville had a population of 1,745. The median age was 29.2 years. 34.2% of residents were under the age of 18 and 9.4% of residents were 65 years of age or older. For every 100 females there were 95.0 males, and for every 100 females age 18 and over there were 91.2 males age 18 and over.

0.0% of residents lived in urban areas, while 100.0% lived in rural areas.

There were 592 households in Fennville, of which 44.1% had children under the age of 18 living in them. Of all households, 43.8% were married-couple households, 16.7% were households with a male householder and no spouse or partner present, and 29.7% were households with a female householder and no spouse or partner present. About 24.0% of all households were made up of individuals and 9.6% had someone living alone who was 65 years of age or older.

There were 642 housing units, of which 7.8% were vacant. The homeowner vacancy rate was 3.1% and the rental vacancy rate was 9.5%.

Racial composition as of the 2020 census
Race	Number	Percent
White	1,037	59.4%
Black or African American	49	2.8%
American Indian and Alaska Native	15	0.9%
Asian	7	0.4%
Native Hawaiian and Other Pacific Islander	0	0.0%
Some other race	347	19.9%
Two or more races	290	16.6%
Hispanic or Latino (of any race)	726	41.6%

=== 2010 census ===
As of the census of 2010, there were 1,398 people, 505 households, and 346 families residing in the city. The population density was 1,270.9 inhabitants per square mile (490.7/km^{2}). There were 588 housing units at an average density of 534.5 per square mile (206.4/km^{2}). The racial makeup of the city was 72.6% White, 1.9% African American, 0.5% Native American, 0.1% Asian, 20.7% from other races, and 4.2% from two or more races. Hispanic or Latino of any race were 39.1% of the population.

There were 505 households, of which 45.9% had children under the age of 18 living with them, 42.2% were married couples living together, 17.8% had a female householder with no husband present, 8.5% had a male householder with no wife present, and 31.5% were non-families. 26.7% of all households were made up of individuals, and 8.7% had someone living alone who was 65 years of age or older. The average household size was 2.77 and the average family size was 3.36.

The median age in the city was 28.7 years. 34.9% of residents were under the age of 18; 8.5% were between the ages of 18 and 24; 28.4% were from 25 to 44; 20.7% were from 45 to 64; and 7.7% were 65 years of age or older. The gender makeup of the city was 50.3% male and 49.7% female.

=== 2000 census ===
As of the census of 2000, there were 1,459 people, 484 households, and 349 families residing in the city. The population density was 1,378.4 inhabitants per square mile (532.2/km^{2}). There were 552 housing units at an average density of 521.5 per square mile (201.4/km^{2}). The racial makeup of the city was 73.27% White, 3.15% African American, 0.75% Native American, 0.34% Asian, 19.81% from other races, and 2.67% from two or more races. Hispanic or Latino of any race were 32.63% of the population.

There were 484 households, out of which 48.8% had children under the age of 18 living with them, 50.4% were married couples living together, 16.1% had a female householder with no husband present, and 27.7% were non-families. 23.3% of all households were made up of individuals, and 8.7% had someone living alone who was 65 years of age or older. The average household size was 3.01 and the average family size was 3.53.

In the city, the population was spread out, with 38.0% under the age of 18, 10.7% from 18 to 24, 29.8% from 25 to 44, 15.1% from 45 to 64, and 6.4% who were 65 years of age or older. The median age was 26 years. For every 100 females, there were 98.0 males. For every 100 females aged 18 and over, there were 88.1 males.

The median income for a household in the city was $39,013, and the median income for a family was $40,875. Males had a median income of $32,833 versus $25,556 for females. The per capita income for the city was $16,127. About 9.7% of families and 12.2% of the population were below the poverty line, including 15.5% of those under age 18 and 9.5% of those aged 65 or over.

== Education ==
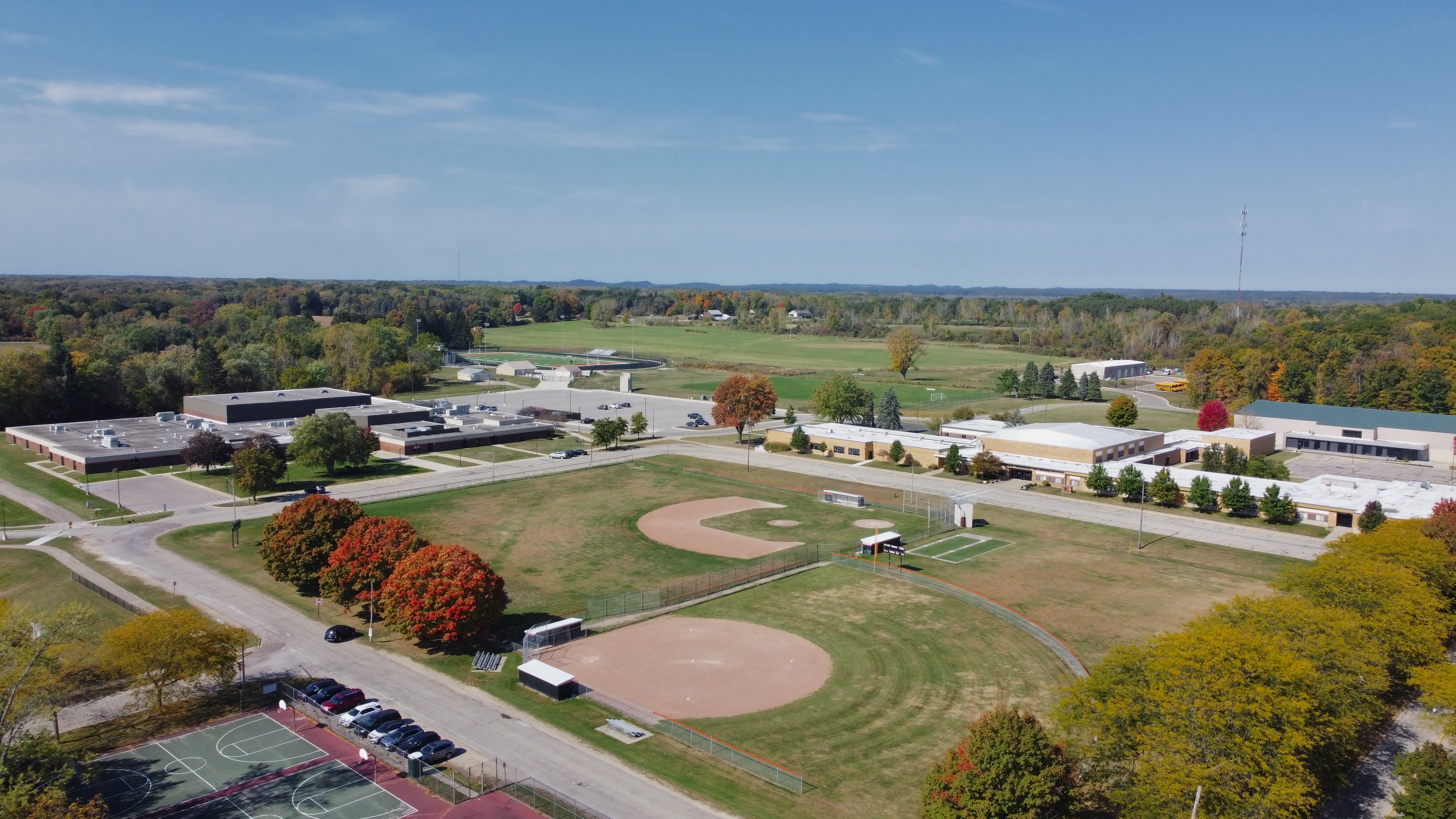
Fennville Middle School and Fennville High School

The first library in Fennville was created by the Fennville Women's Club in 1922, and in 1925 the club moved it to an Italian-style house located at 415 East Main Street. In 1990, the library moved from its original structure to a new location, and city residents transported each item by hand from the old location to the new one.

The city also has local educational institutions, including an elementary school, a middle school and a high school.

Currently, the Fennville Public Schools district includes:

- Fennville High School (9-12)
- Fennville Middle School (6-8)
- Fennville Elementary School (K-5)
- Pearl Alternative/Adult Education School (9-12)

The Discovery Elementary School, a chartered public school academy located in Fennville, closed at the end of the 2009 school year.

== Tourism ==
Fennville is recognized as an agritourism destination in the Grand Rapids metropolitan area. Located ten minutes from the scenic coastal city of Saugatuck, Michigan, Fennville is noted for its small town charm that includes local shops, restaurants supplied with ingredients from nearby farmers and its vineyards. In the autumn season, corn mazes and you-pick fruit harvesting at orchards, along with the annual Goose Festival, are popular activities.

=== Goose Festival ===
Each October since 1984, Fennville has held an annual local event known as the Goose Festival. Fennville's Goose Festival promotes the abundance of area game and wildlife, with a special emphasis on thousands of Canada geese as they pass through the nearby Todd Farm Unit of the Allegan State Game Area during their seasonal migration. One impetus for creating the festival was to encourage passenger train visitation via Amtrak on the railway that runs through Fennville. Tens of thousands of people flock to the small town annually to enjoy the various activities and attractions planned and managed by the volunteer-based Goose Festival organization that operates the Goose Festival. In 2025, the Goose Festival was put on pause, though a smaller-scale celebration occurred. The community aims to bring the festival back in 2026.

=== Wine ===
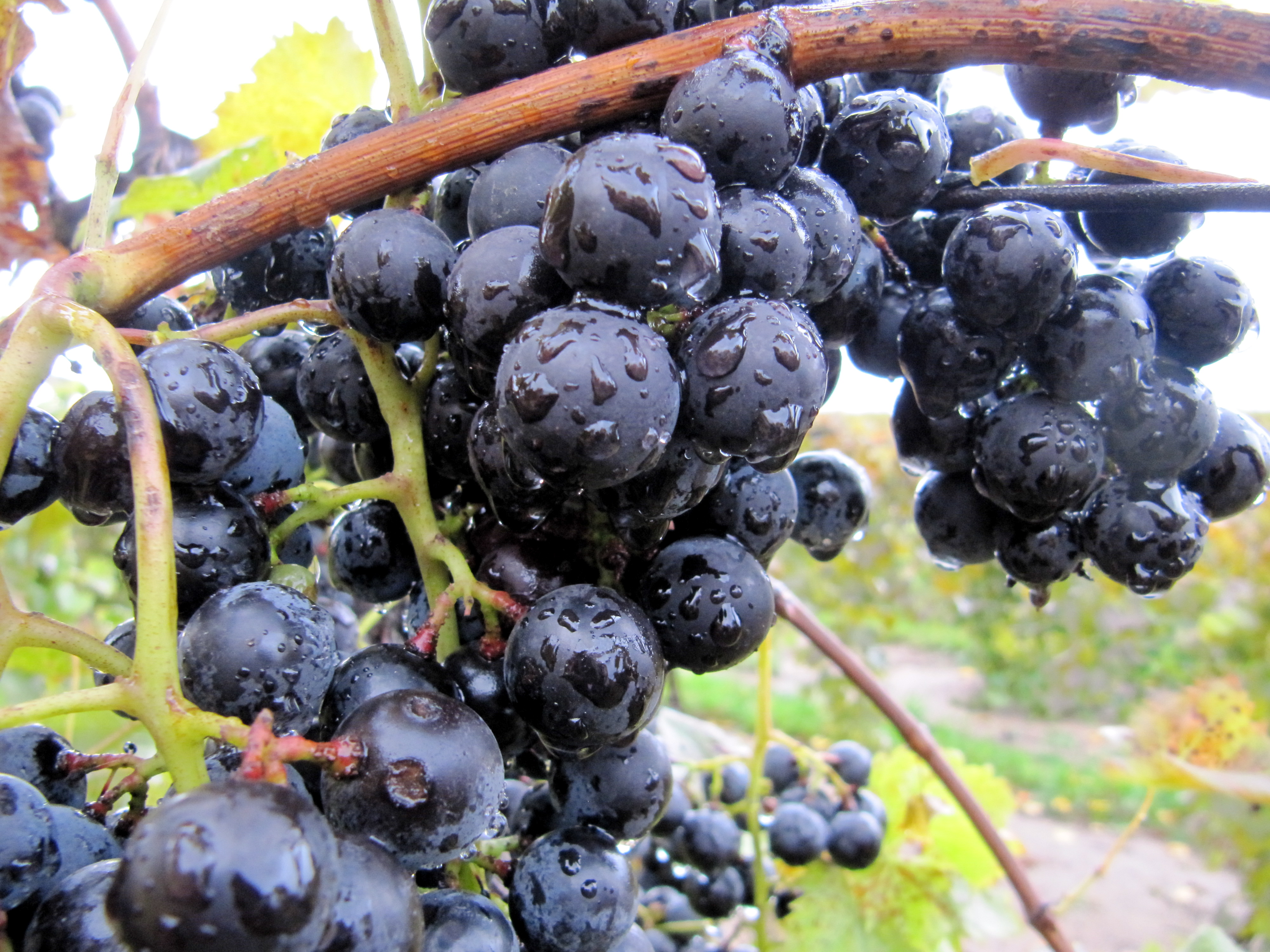
Grapes at a Fennville vineyard

Also playing a role in Fennville's appeal as a tourist destination, the city and surrounding region is an American Viticultural Area, the Fennville AVA, known for the production of Michigan wine. Locals reported that they had grown grapes and sold them to wine merchants in Chicago since the late 1800s and that dozens of farms historically grew grapes for either juice, jelly or wine.

In 1973, William Welsch bought an old, abused 230-acre (93 ha) fruit farm, which was converted into Fenn Valley Vineyards. In September 18, 1981, the Fennville AVA was recognized by the Bureau of Alcohol, Tobacco and Firearms (ATF) and the Department of Treasury after reviewing the petition submitted by Welsch on behalf of local vintners. The soil in the Fennville area is different from surrounding areas, primarily glacial sandy soils. The area's climate is moderated by the nearby Lake Michigan, and few days in the summer growing season exceed 90 °F (32 °C). Grape growers in the area have had success with both Vitis vinifera and Vitis labrusca wine grapes.

== Notable people ==
- Patricia L. Birkholz - Michigan State Senator
- Edward Hutchinson - United States Representative for the 4th Congressional District of Michigan 1963 – 1977
