= Tip of the Mitt AVA =

American Viticultural Area in Michigan

Coordinates: 45°21′46″N 84°53′41″W

Tip of the Mitt
- Wine region
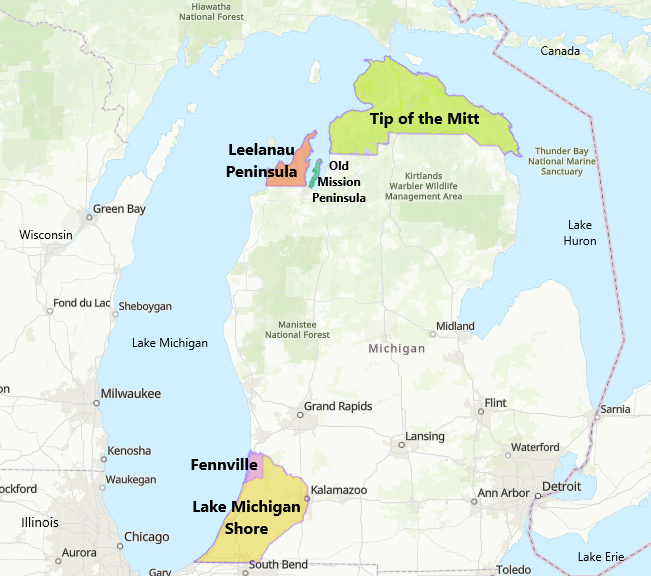
- Michigan AVAs
- Type: American Viticultural Area
- Year established: 2016
- Years of wine industry: 27
- Country: United States
- Part of: Michigan
- Other regions in Michigan: Fennville AVA, Lake Michigan Shore AVA, Old Mission Peninsula AVA, Leelanau Peninsula AVA
- Growing season: 117–161 days
- Climate region: Region I
- Heat units: 1959.1–2407.7 GDD
- Soil conditions: Coarse-textured glacial till and Lacustrine sand and gravel
- Total area: 1.77 million acres (2,760 sq mi)
- Size of planted vineyards: 143+ acres (58+ ha)
- No. of vineyards: 41
- Grapes produced: Aurore, Auxerrois, Bianca, Cabernet Franc, Chambourcin, Cayuga, Chardonnay, De Chaunac, Dolcetto, Frontenac, Gamay noir, Gewurztraminer, Lemberger, Leon Millot, Malbec, Marquette, Marechal Foch, Merlot, Muscat Ottonel, Pinot Blanc, Pinot Gris, Pinot Noir, Riesling, Seyval Blanc, Traminette, Vignoles
- No. of wineries: 8

Tip of the Mitt is an American Viticultural Area (AVA) located in the northernmost end of the Lower Peninsula of Michigan. The area encompasses all or part of Alpena, Antrim, Charlevoix, Cheboygan, Emmet, and Presque Isle counties at the northern tip of the Lower Peninsula, north of the established Leelanau Peninsula AVA and Old Mission Peninsula AVA grouped around Traverse City. It was established as the nation's 236^{th} and Michigan's fifth wine appellation on July 21, 2016 by the Alcohol and Tobacco Tax and Trade Bureau (TTB), Treasury after reviewing the petition submitted by the Straits Area Grape Growers Association, on behalf of winery and vineyard owners in the northern portion of Michigan's Lower Peninsula, proposing a viticultural area named "Tip of the Mitt".

The appellation is approximately 1.77 million acres (2,760 sq mi) in extent bordered by Grand Traverse Bay, Little Traverse Bay, and Lake Michigan to the west; the Straits of Mackinac to the north; and Lake Huron to the east. At the outset, there were 41 commercially-producing vineyards covering a total of 94 acres (38 ha) distributed throughout the AVA, along with eight wineries. According to the petition, an additional 48 acres (19 ha) of vineyards and four new wineries were planned in the near future. Tip of the Mitt wineries are grouped around Petoskey, the county seat of Emmet County. The major wine trail in the area, the Petoskey Wine Trail, was formerly known as The Bay View Wine Trail.

The Straits Area Grape Growers Association announced its intent to specialize in cold-hardy vines.The area is suited for the cultivation of cold-weather varietals such as Marquette and Frontenac.

== Name evidence ==
Tip of the Mitt AVA derives its name from its location at the northernmost end of Michigan's Lower Peninsula. The Lower Peninsula of Michigan is shaped like a mitten, and the AVA is located at the northern tip of the mitten. The petition noted that Tip of the Mitt has long been used to describe the region in which the AVA is located, and the petitioner included copies of three postcards dated from the 1960s which were submitted to demonstrate the historical use of the phrase in connection with that region. The first postcard contains a photo of the Tip of the Mitt Motel in Mackinaw City, which is located within the AVA. The second postcard depicts a map of the northern portion of the Lower Peninsula and is labeled "The Tip of the Mitt". The third postcard contains a photo of the Tip of the Mitt Restaurant in Topinabee, a community located within the AVA. The petition included additional evidence that the region of the AVA is currently known as Tip of the Mitt". The petitioner submitted as one piece of evidence an online guide of hiking trails that divides Michigan into nine regions, including the Tip of the Mitt region in the northern portion of the Lower Peninsula. Several annual events held throughout the AVA use the name, including the Tip of the Mitt Paddle Fest, the Tip of the Mitt Tractor Show, the Tip of the Mitt Classic road bike race, and a sailing race known as Michigan Challenge: Tip of the Mitt. Finally, the petition included a list of 14 businesses and non-profit organizations within the AVA.

One commenter supported the establishment of the proposed AVA but did not support the proposed name. The commenter stated that he believed Tip of the Mitt was a "whimsical" name that is "Michigan slang" and "doesn't provide the public with an accurate geographical description" of where the proposed AVA is located. The commenter suggested "The Straits" or "Little Traverse" as alternate names for the proposed AVA, but did not provide any evidence to support the alternative AVA names. Section 9.12(a)(1) of TTB regulations requires, among other things, that:

1. A proposed AVA name be currently and directly associated with an area in which viticulture exists;
2. the proposed name apply to all of the area within the proposed AVA; and
3. the region of the proposed AVA be known nationally or locally by the proposed name.

Although "Little Traverse" and "The Straits" both refer to geographical features within the proposed AVA, the commenter did not provide evidence to show that the entire region of the proposed AVA is known locally or nationally by either of those names. Additionally, "The Straits" could apply to any of the numerous straits in the United States and is therefore unsuitable as an AVA name without a geographical modifier. Therefore, TTB does not believe that either "Little Traverse" or "The Straits" meets the regulatory requirements for an AVA name. TTB believed that the petition to establish the Tip of the Mitt AVA provided sufficient evidence to demonstrate that the name "Tip of the Mitt" is widely used throughout the proposed AVA to describe the region. The petition included names of local businesses and organizations and regional events that use the phrase in their names. Therefore, TTB determined that "Tip of the Mitt" meets the regulatory requirements for an AVA name as set forth in § 9.12(a)

== Terroir ==
=== Climate ===
The climate of the Tip of the Mitt AVA is generally warmer than that of the region to the south. According to the petition, the primary reason for the warmer temperatures within the AVA is the westerly prevailing winds that distribute warmer air from the surface of Lake Michigan across the region. As a result of these warm winds, the proposed AVA has a suitable climate for growing cold-hardy hybrid grape varieties such as Frontenac, La Crescent, and Marquette. The following table compares the average annual high and low temperatures, as well as the average annual extreme low temperature and the average number of days per year with high temperatures below 32 °F (0 °C) and below 0 °F (−18 °C), for six weather stations within the Tip of the Mitt AVA and five weather stations south of the AVA. The data shows that although temperatures within the AVA are cold, the region to the south has average annual low temperatures that are generally lower than those within the AVA. The region to the south also generally has more days per year with high temperatures below 32 °F (0 °C) and also below 0 °F (−18 °C). The petition states that the number of very cold days is important to viticulture because only certain varieties of grapes can withstand very low temperatures. The petition states that, according to data produced by Iowa State University, there are 17 less-hardy varieties of grapes that can tolerate temperatures between −15 and −20 °F (−26 and −29 °C), including Marechel Foch and Leon Millot. Because the average annual extreme low temperatures for four of the six locations within the AVA are warmer than −20 °F (−29 °C), and half of the locations within the AVA have extreme low temperatures above −15 °F (−26 °C), these 17 varieties of grapes could reasonably be expected to survive and produce consistent crops within the AVA. However, because none of the locations south of the AVA have annual extreme low temperatures above −15 °F (−26 °C) degrees, it is less likely that these 17 varieties would thrive and produce crops reliably south of the AVA. The petition included information on growing season length and growing degree days (GDDs) gathered from locations both within and outside of the AVA. The data shows that the growing season for most locations within the AVA is longer than the growing season for most locations south of the AVA, and that most locations within the AVA have higher GDD accumulations than locations to the south. GDDs are important to viticulture because they represent how often the daily temperatures rise above 50 °F (10 °C), which is the minimum temperature required for active vine growth and fruit development. Because the AVA has a growing season that is generally longer, and GDD accumulations that are generally higher, than the region to the south, vineyard owners are able to grow less-hardy grapes as well as mid-to-late season ripening varieties, such as Frontenac, which would not ripen as consistently if they were grown south of the AVA. The higher GDD accumulations within the Tip of the Mitt AVA compensate for the relatively short growing season because the growing season temperatures rise above 50 degrees frequently enough during the growing season to allow the grapes to mature. For example, Boyne Falls has the shortest growing season of any location within the AVA, and the growing season is shorter than all but one of the locations south of the AVA. However, grapes are still able to ripen reliably in Boyne Falls because the average growing season GDD accumulation is 2,407.7. By contrast, even though four of the five locations south of the AVA have longer growing seasons than Boyne Falls, all of the locations south of the AVA still have significantly lower GDD accumulations. The USDA plant hardiness zone ranges from 4b to 6b.

=== Soils ===
The predominant soils within the Tip of the Mitt AVA contain coarse-textured glacial till and Lacustrine sand and gravel. Soils that contain either glacial outwash sand and gravel or ice-contact sand and gravel are only present in small amounts. The soils of the AVA have high levels of organic matter, which prevents nutrients from leaching rapidly. As a result, vineyard owners do not have to apply supplemental nutrients as frequently or heavily as in areas with soils that have lower levels of organic material. Soils with high levels of organic material also have a high water-holding capacity, so vineyard owners within the AVA often take steps to limit accumulations of soil moisture, such as planting cover crops between the rows of vines to help absorb excess water. Finally, the soils of the AVA do not heat up as quickly in the early spring as soils that contain higher levels of sand and gravel. The cool soil temperatures naturally prevent bud-break, often delaying new growth from forming until after the threat of damaging frost is over. According to the petition, delaying bud-break until after the threat of frost has passed is particularly important when growing cultivars that typically have an early bud-break such as Leon Millot or Marquette, which are both commonly grown in the AVA. South of the AVA, the soils are primarily glacial outwash sand and gravel and ice-contact sand and gravel, which are low in organic matter. Lesser quantities of coarse-textured glacial till and end moraines of fine- and coarse-textured till also occur. Because the soils south of the AVA contain low amounts of organic matter, they require heavier and more frequent additions of nutrients. The soils also have a lower water-holding capacity, increasing the need for supplemental irrigation. Vineyard owners also attempt to maintain plant-free conditions between rows, in order to maximize the amount of water available for the vines. Finally, the lower levels of organic matter, combined with higher levels of sand and gravel, allow soils south of the AVA to warm up more rapidly in the spring, which encourages bud-break before the last spring frost has occurred.

== Viticulture ==
Straits Area Grape Growers Association represents growers and supporters of the viticulture industry throughout the northern Lower Peninsula of Michigan. The area, which opened its first winery, Nicholas Black River Winery, in 1999, has experienced rapid growth within the past decade with significant planned growth in the coming years. As a result, the Association has deemed it appropriate to petition the TTB for the creation of an American Viticultural Area (AVA) to further support the industry as it grows into the future. The area that encompasses the AVA, which had minimal viticultural activity as recently as 2000, currently supports an industry that totals 41 commercial grape-growers, with 94 acres (38 ha) planted along with eight bonded wineries. Within the next five years, there are expressed plans amongst growers and future winery owners that would bring this total to, at a minimum, 142 acres (57 ha) of vineyards and 12 bonded wineries. As a result of the cooler climate, most cultivars grown in this region are cold-hardy hybrid varieties, such as Frontenac, La Crescent and Marquette, all bred by the University of Minnesota's viticulture department and released for propagation and production in 1996, 2002 and 2006, respectively.
