= Leelanau Peninsula AVA =

American Viticultural Area in Michigan

Coordinates: 44°54′48″N 85°38′52″W

Leelanau Peninsula
- Wine region
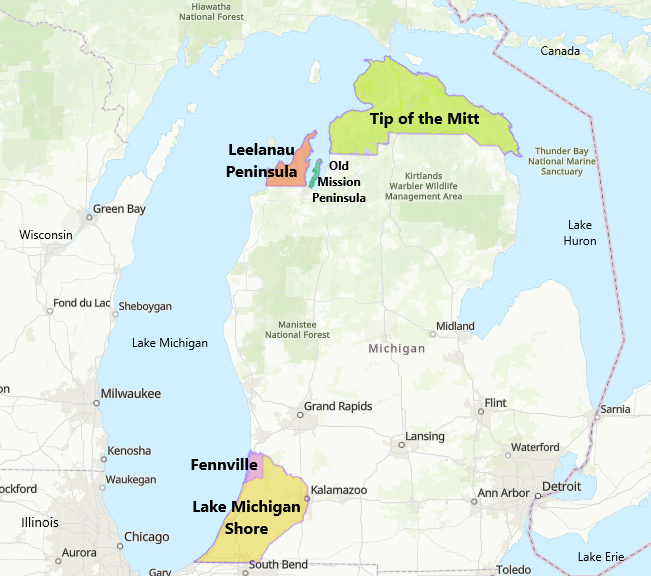
- Michigan AVAs
- Type: American Viticultural Area
- Year established: 1982
- Country: United States
- Part of: Michigan
- Other regions in Michigan: Lake Michigan Shore AVA, Old Mission Peninsula AVA, Fennville AVA, Tip of the Mitt AVA
- Growing season: 140–150 days
- Climate region: Region Ib
- Heat units: 2300 GDD
- Soil conditions: Granite and limestone bedrock, clay subsoils, with sand and gravel loam
- Total area: 330 sq mi (210,000 acres; 85,000 ha)
- Size of planted vineyards: 800+ acres (320+ ha)
- No. of vineyards: 14
- Grapes produced: Aurore, Auxerrois, Bianca, Cabernet Franc, Cabernet Sauvignon, Cayuga, Chardonnay, De Chaunac, Dolcetto, Gewurztraminer, Malbec, Marechal Foch, Merlot, Pinot Blanc, Pinot gris, Pinot noir, Riesling, Seyval Blanc, Traminette, Vignoles
- No. of wineries: 28

Leelanau Peninsula (//liːˈlɑːnoʊ// LEE-luh-naw) is an American Viticultural Area (AVA) located in Leelanau County on a peninsula between Lake Michigan to the west and Grand Traverse Bay to the east in the northern Lower Peninsula of Michigan. It was established as the nation's tenth and Michigan's second wine appellation on March 30, 1982, by the Bureau of Alcohol, Tobacco and Firearms (ATF), Treasury after reviewing the petition submitted by Lawrence Mawby, proprietor of the L. Mawby Vineyards & Winery in Suttons Bay, on behalf of local vintners proposing the viticultural area named "Leelanau Peninsula".

The 330-square-mile (211,200-acre; 85,470 ha) peninsula receives the tempering "lake effect" of Lake Michigan. Its climate is distinguished from the surrounding area by a more moderate high and low temperature range. This lake effect moderates the winter and summer temperature extremes, and delays budding of the vines beyond the late spring frosts. The lake effect also causes generally uniform climatic conditions, since large bodies of water retain heat and cold and react slower to temperature fluctuations. many types of fruit and vegetables. At the outset, Michigan's two wine-grape regions were 200 miles (320 km) apart along the Lake Michigan shore. The number of frost-free growing days, normally during the period of May 10 through October 13, in these two grape-growing regions differ by approximately 20 days. The southern region, Fennville on the Lake Michigan shore, averages 160–170 days and the northern region, Leelanau Peninsula, averages 140–150 days. Frost can occur on all but about 145 days of the calendar year. The soil in Leelanau Peninsula is complex, with glacial deposits of clay, sand, and loam on top of bedrock of granite and limestone. The hardiness zones are 6a and 6b.

== History ==
The heavily timbered wilderness that became Leelanau County is said to owe its name to the Indians who lived and moved about in all of Northern Michigan. They made trails, many of which are today's highways. They marked their routes with trees which were bent as saplings and which in some places still survive. But otherwise they left no records, only legends, so very little is known about the length of their occupancy. As for the white man, there is a definite possibility that French explorers moved through the waters in their canoes as early as 1622. They may have used the islands as their camping grounds as they explored, though there are no records of it. During the century that followed, when the French and the British, and the Indians, fought for possession of the lands and waters of the north country, no mention is made of this county's land. It was not until 1836 that the area comprising this county began to appear in written records. In the Treaty of Washington, signed in 1836, the Indians, for an agreed compensation, ceded their rights to the upper western half of the state. And four years later the area was laid out into 21 unorganized counties, all of which were given Indian names by Henry Schoolcraft, who was United States Commissioner to the Indians. One of the name selected was "Leelinau", spelled with an "i" instead of an "a", and he translated the word as meaning "delight of life". In one of his books, Algic Researches, he has a story called "Leelinau, on Ojibway Tale", in which he tells the story of an Indian girl who lived on the south shore of Lake Superior. This tale is repeated in Longfellow's "Myth of Hiawatha", in which the heroine says: "From her baby Neenizu, my dear life, she was called Leelinau." There is another opinion, however, to the effect that Leelanau does not appear to be an Indian name, there being no similarity in root between it and the Ottawa tongue. The assumption in this case is that the word is of French derivation, based upon the fact that the area is on the lee of the waters, "eau" or "au" (French) of Lake Michigan. The name has survived, however, with the adopted spelling using an "a" instead of an "i". At first it was entered in the state records as Leelanaw because someone in Lansing read the handwritten "u" as a "w". This spelling appeared on all maps and records until it was officially changed in 1896.

The name of the area, Leelanau Peninsula, was well documented in the petition as an area which has been associated with fruit-growing for over 100 years. At the outset, the area was identified as a distinctive grape-growing region containing four wineries. These wineries had approximately 120 acres (49 ha) of bearing French hybrid and Vinifera grapes. An additional 25 to 30 acres (10 to 12 ha) of these varieties have been planted.

== Terroir ==
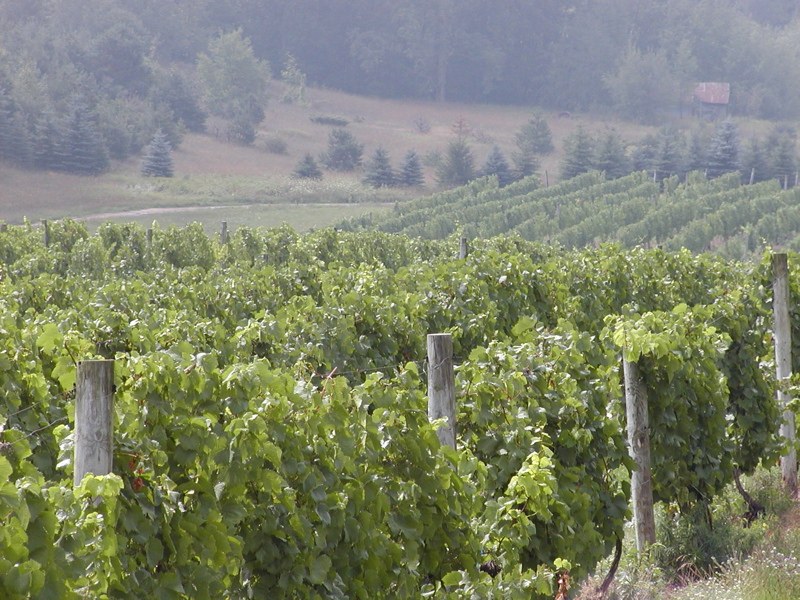
Leelanau Peninsula vineyard

The Leelanau Peninsula was formed by glacial action and is distinguishable on three sides by natural features: Lake Michigan on the west and north, and the West Arm of Grand Traverse Bay on the east. One petition comment stated that "the moderating effect of Lake Michigan delays fruit development in the spring generally beyond the most serious frost period and then prevents sudden drops in temperature in the fall. This area of Michigan also receives considerable winter snowfall which generally prevents the soil from freezing, thus preventing fruit tree and vine crop root injury." The petitioned area contains microclimates which support varieties of French hybrid and Vinifera winegrapes. The soils in the proposed area vary widely, as is always the case when land is formed by glacial action and deposits. The soil levels consist of granite and limestone bedrock, clay subsoils, with sand and gravel loam surface soils. This area is characterized by large deep inland lakes which add an additional moderating effect to the climate, high-rolling and heavily timbered hills in the north, and undulating plateaus in the south which rise 250 to 400 feet (76 to 122 m) above Lake Michigan. The Leelanau Peninsula and the Old Mission Peninsula to the east, comprise one of Michigan's two wine grape regions, northern and southern. The other region is located approximately 200 miles (320 km) south along the Lake Michigan shore. These two regions are distinguishable by an average 20 day difference in the number of frost-free growing days which relates to an approximate difference of 400–500 cumulative growing-degree days (2300 degree days in the Leelanau area and 2800 degree days in the southern area). Based on the information contained in the petition and comments received pertaining to the geographical, climatic and soil features, the ATF determined that the proposed area is distinguishable from the surrounding area. Leelanau Peninsula's 45th Parallel is the same parallel as the renowned Bordeaux and Côtes du Rhône regions of France and the Piedmont region of Italy.
