= Old Mission Peninsula AVA =

American Viticultural Area in Michigan

Coordinates: 44°52′49″N 85°30′40″W

Old Mission Peninsula
- Wine region
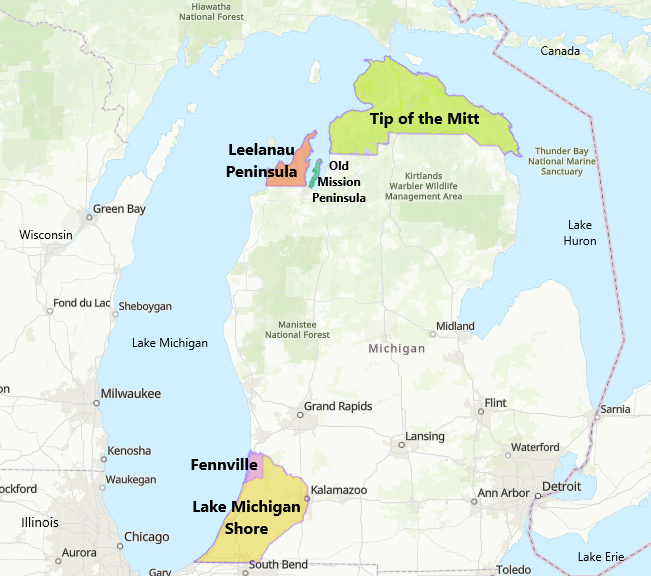
- Type: American Viticultural Area
- Year established: 1987
- Country: United States
- Part of: Michigan
- Other regions in Michigan: Fennville AVA, Lake Michigan Shore AVA, Leelanau Peninsula AVA, Tip of the Mitt AVA
- Growing season: 2,075 days
- Climate region: Region Ib
- Heat units: 2,134 GDD units
- Total area: 19,200 acres (30 sq mi)
- Size of planted vineyards: 1,800 acres (730 ha)
- No. of vineyards: 7
- Grapes produced: Cabernet Franc, Cabernet Sauvignon, Chardonnay, Gamay noir, Gewurztraminer, Malbec, Merlot, Muscat Ottonel, Pinot blanc, Pinot gris, Pinot noir, Riesling
- No. of wineries: 8

Old Mission Peninsula is an American Viticultural Area (AVA) located in Grand Traverse County on the Old Mission Peninsula landform extending into Grand Traverse Bay of Lake Michigan in Northern Michigan. The peninsula is approximately 19 miles (31 km) long and no more than three miles (4.8 km) wide at any point bracketed by Traverse City at the southern end and Old Mission Point on its northern end. It was established as the nation's 92^{nd} and Michigan's fourth wine appellation on June 8, 1987 by the Bureau of Alcohol, Tobacco and Firearms (ATF), Treasury after reviewing the petition submitted by Edward O'Keefe, President of the Chateau Grand Traverse Winery, proposing a viticultural area named "Old Mission Peninsula".

The total size is approximately 19,200 acres (30 sq mi) with 1,800 acres (730 ha) of vinifera vineyards for wine production in the Old Mission Peninsula. Chateau Grand Traverse Winery was the only winery located within the boundary of the viticultural area. As of 2023, the Peninsula wine industry includes 11 wineries and a thriving enotourism industry. The climate on the peninsula is moderated by the surrounding waters, helping to prevent frost during the growing season. Grape varietals suitable to cool climates, such as Riesling, Chardonnay, Gewürztraminer, Pinot gris, Pinot noir, Cabernet Franc, and Merlot do best in the Old Mission Peninsula AVA.

The peninsula has extensive cherry orchards and vineyards. There are ten wineries offering tasting rooms, each located within five miles (8.0 km) of each other. Of Traverse City's two wine-growing peninsulas, Old Mission is smaller and more easily accessible in a single day. The hardiness zones are 5b and 6a.

== History ==
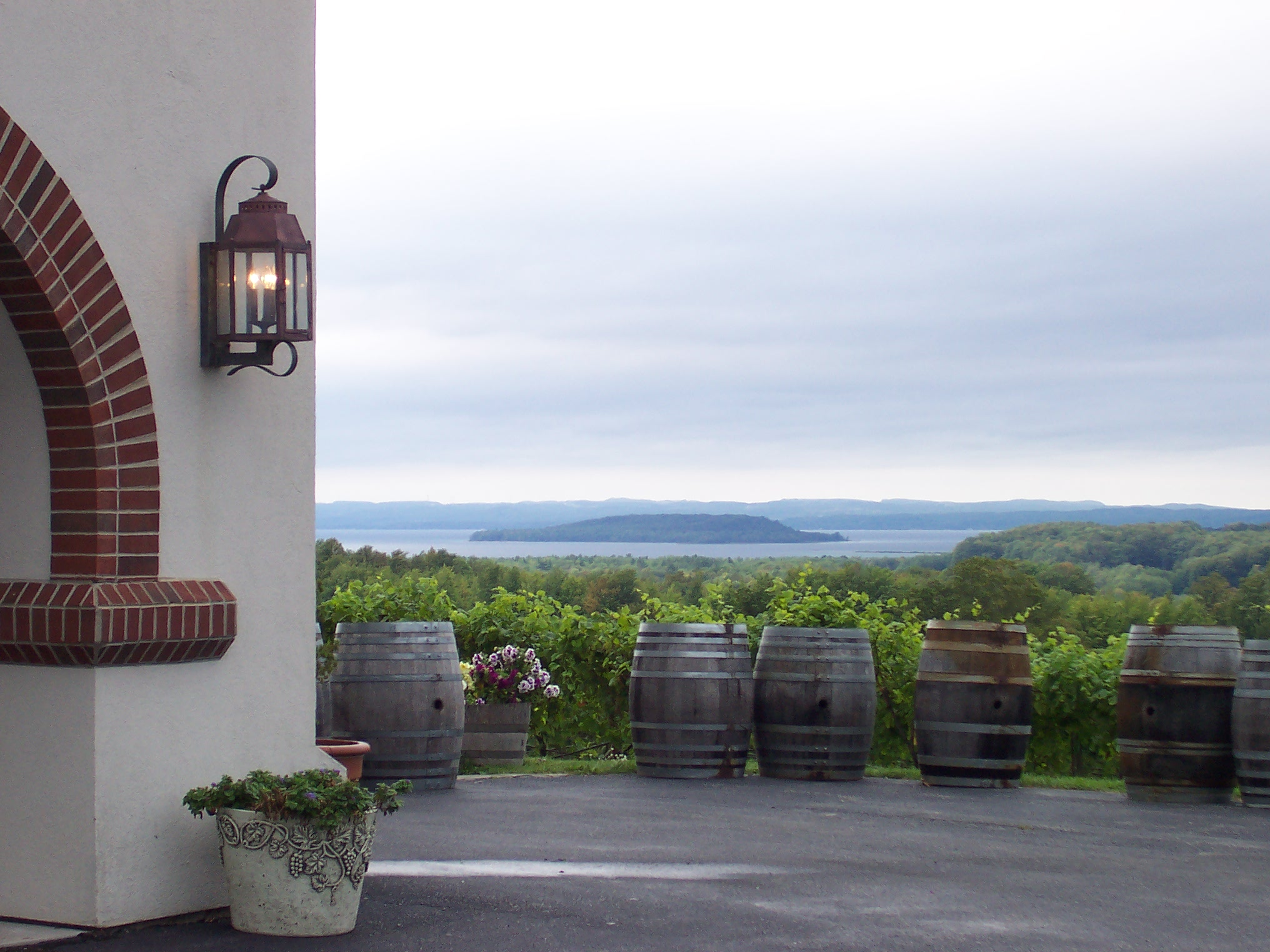
Chateau Chantal winery on the Old Mission Peninsula

The Old Mission Peninsula was settled in 1842 by a Presbyterian minister. During the Civil War period, the area saw an influx in population with many families today able to trace their ties to the area back to this period. Located along the 45th parallel north, and moderated by Lake Michigan and the deep Grand Traverse Bay, the region soon showed that it had macroclimate to produce a wide range of fruits and vegetables. Early agriculture in the area subsisted on apples, cherries and potatoes. In 1870, George Parmalee, of the Michigan State Horticultural Society, encouraged farmers of Old Mission Peninsula to branch out to different plantings but it would be another 100 years before wine grape varieties really took hold in the area.

In 1974, Edward O'Keefe Jr. of Chateau Grand Traverse began planting Vitis vinifera varieties including Chardonnay, Pinot noir and Riesling near Traverse City. The following year he expanded to 55 acres (22 ha) of grapevines, which was the first large-scale planting of Vitis vinifera. (However, it was not the very first commercial planting of vinifera since Tabor Hill Winery of Berrien County, had planted a few experimental acres of vinifera grapevines in southwest Michigan in 1969.)
In the 1980s, the Michigan wine industry flourished with its initial AVA Fennville (1981) established followed by the neighboring Leelanau Peninsula (1982) and Lake Michigan Shore (1983).

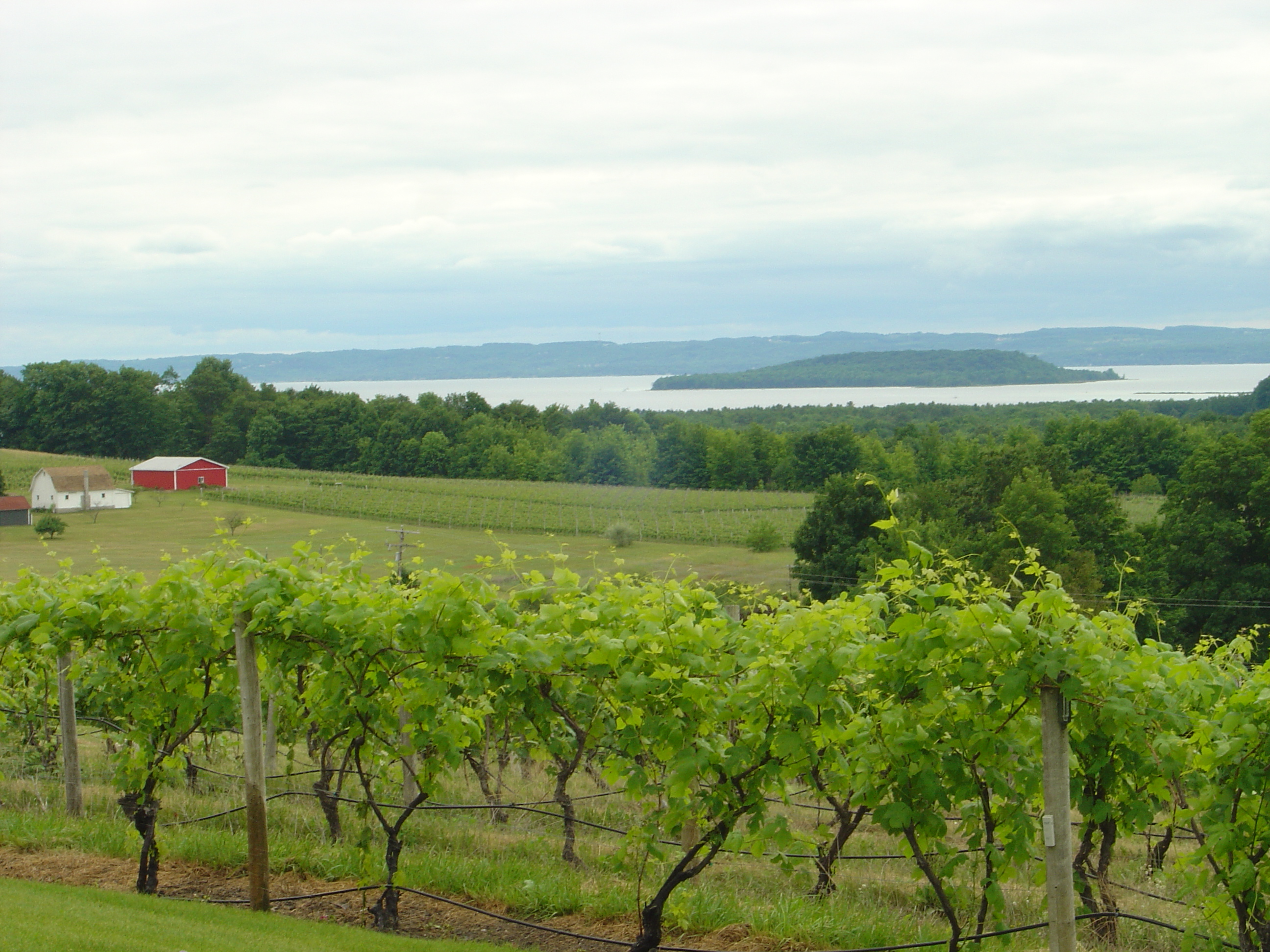
Peninsula vineyard

== Grape varieties and wine styles ==
Currently the wineries of the Old Mission Peninsula are focused on the production of Vinifera wines with an average of 90,000 cases produced in the AVA on a yearly basis. Among the grape varieties planted in the peninsula are Cabernet Franc, Cabernet Sauvignon, Chardonnay, Gamay noir, Gewurztraminer, Malbec, Merlot, Muscat Ottonel, Pinot blanc, Pinot gris, Pinot noir, Riesling.

== Wineries ==
There are 11 wineries in the Old Mission Peninsula AVA. The Old Mission Peninsula AVA sits close to the 45th parallel, a longitude known for growing prestigious grapes. Wineries featured on the Old Mission Peninsula Wine Trail are 2 Lads Winery, Bonobo Winery, Black Star Farms, Bowers Harbor Vineyards, Brys Estate Vineyard & Winery, Chateau Chantal, Chateau Grand Traverse, Hawthorne Vineyards, Left Foot Charley (with vineyards in OMP, winery in Traverse City), Mari Vineyards, Peninsula Cellars, and Tabone Vineyards.
