= Chateau Grand Traverse =

Winery in Michigan, United States

Coordinates: 44.86509°N 85.51993°W

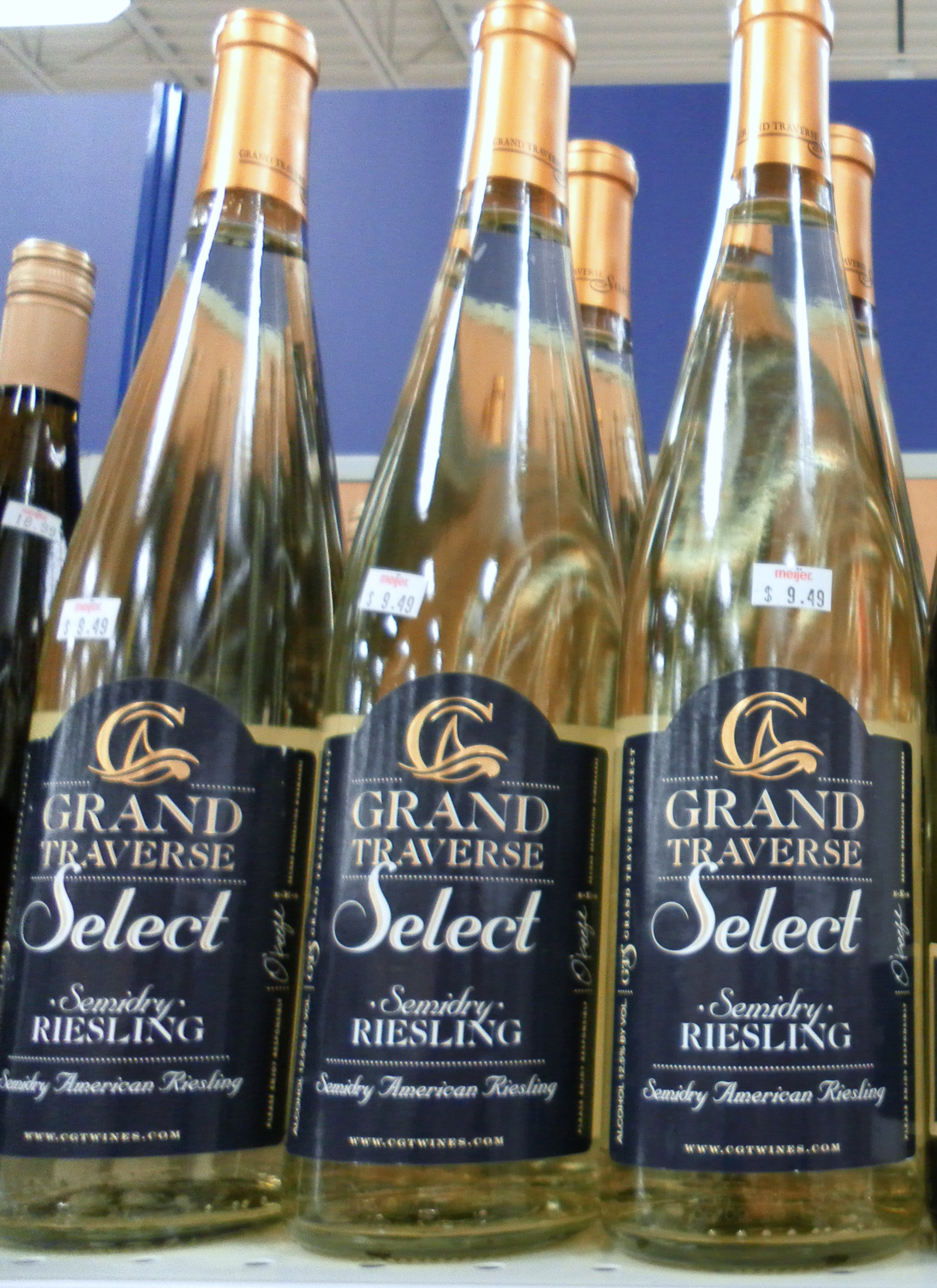
Bottles of Grand Traverse Select Riesling, one of the brands produced by Chateau Grand Traverse

Chateau Grand Traverse is a Michigan winery located in the Old Mission Peninsula AVA around Traverse City. The winery was founded by Edward O'Keefe Jr. and is notable for having the first large-scale planting of Vitis vinifera in Michigan. O'Keefe and Chateau Grand Traverse were also the driving force behind the establishment of an American Viticultural Area on the Old Mission Peninsula back in the 1980s when the estate was the only commercial winery on the peninsula. In 1980, the winery produced Michigan's first commercial ice wine and the 1987 vintage of Chateau Grand Traverse Johannisberg Riesling Ice Wine was served at the presidential inauguration of George H. W. Bush.

== History ==
Edward O'Keefe, Jr., the founder of Chateau Grand Traverse, was born in Philadelphia, Pennsylvania, in 1931. He attended West Chester University and afterwards toured Europe as a member of the US gymnastics team, making the first cut of the 1952 Olympic Men's Gymnastic team. However, his gymnastic career ended abruptly when he ruptured his appendix. During the Korean War, O'Keefe served as a captain in the Airborne Special Forces and was stationed in France and Germany. The situation allowed him to become acquainted with the wines of both regions. After the war, O'Keefe finished his degree at West Chester and then attended the University of Miami School of Law before joining the United States Treasury Department.

In 1973, O'Keefe built a home in Acme Township in Grand Traverse County and began planning a vineyard and winery that would make wine of comparable qualities to those he had encountered in Europe. At the time, the Michigan wine industry was primarily concentrated in the southwestern region of the state (in what is now the Fennville AVA and Lake Michigan Shore AVA), and used grapes from French-American hybrids or Native American labrusca stock. O'Keefe planned to grow Vitis vinifera in the Old Mission Peninsula based on the fact that the peninsula was located along the 45th parallel north, which crosses through many of the world's most notable wine regions. Nevertheless, his plans were greeted with skepticism by many experts within Michigan's viticulture and agricultural establishment.

The 1987 vintage of Chateau Grand Traverse Riesling Ice wine was served at the presidential inauguration of George H.W. Bush.

Seeking help abroad, O'Keefe consulted with German winemaker Karl Werner, who put him in touch with Helmut Becker, chief viticulturist of the Geisenheim Grape Breeding Institute in Germany. Becker traveled to Michigan and appraised O'Keefe on the favorable conditions of his land and gave him advice on changes he should make to the landscape that would maximize his chance of success, namely by ensure proper air drainage that can ward off the risk of frost damage and the creation of a southwest slope that would increase the amount of sunlight that hits the vines. O'Keefe put into action Becker's recommendation and by 1974 was planting Vitis vinifera vines of German clones that were first grafted in Canada. Those early plantings included 55 acres (22 ha) of Riesling, Chardonnay, Pinot noir and Merlot, which was planted almost accidentally after another grower on Lake Leelanau told O'Keefe he was growing Merlot, but the vine actually was a French-American hybrid. However, the vinifera Merlot took hold and the vines were still producing grapes in 2009.

Chateau Grand Traverse became the first bonded winery in northern Michigan on May 1, 1976. O'Keefe sold fruit wines made from apples and cherry until the vinifera grape vines were ready for production. The winery used a second wine label, O’Keefe Cellars, for these fruit wines as well as inexpensive wines made from grapes imported from other areas of the state until 1985 when the label was discontinued. In the 1980s the estate was the only commercial winery on the peninsula and was the driving force behind the recognition of the Old Mission Peninsula was a wine region. In 1980, the winery produced Michigan's first commercial ice wine and the 1987 vintage of Chateau Grand Traverse Johannisberg Riesling Ice Wine was served at the presidential inauguration of George H. W. Bush. By 2009, Chateau Grand Traverse was producing over 80,000 cases of wine a year and is one Michigan's largest wine producers.

== Vineyard ==
The vineyards of Chateau Grand Traverse were designed after the German wine regions of the Rhine with more vines closely planted together (1,066 vines per acre versus 750 vines that was common in the US at the time) along seven-wire parallel trellising system.

== Grapes and wines ==
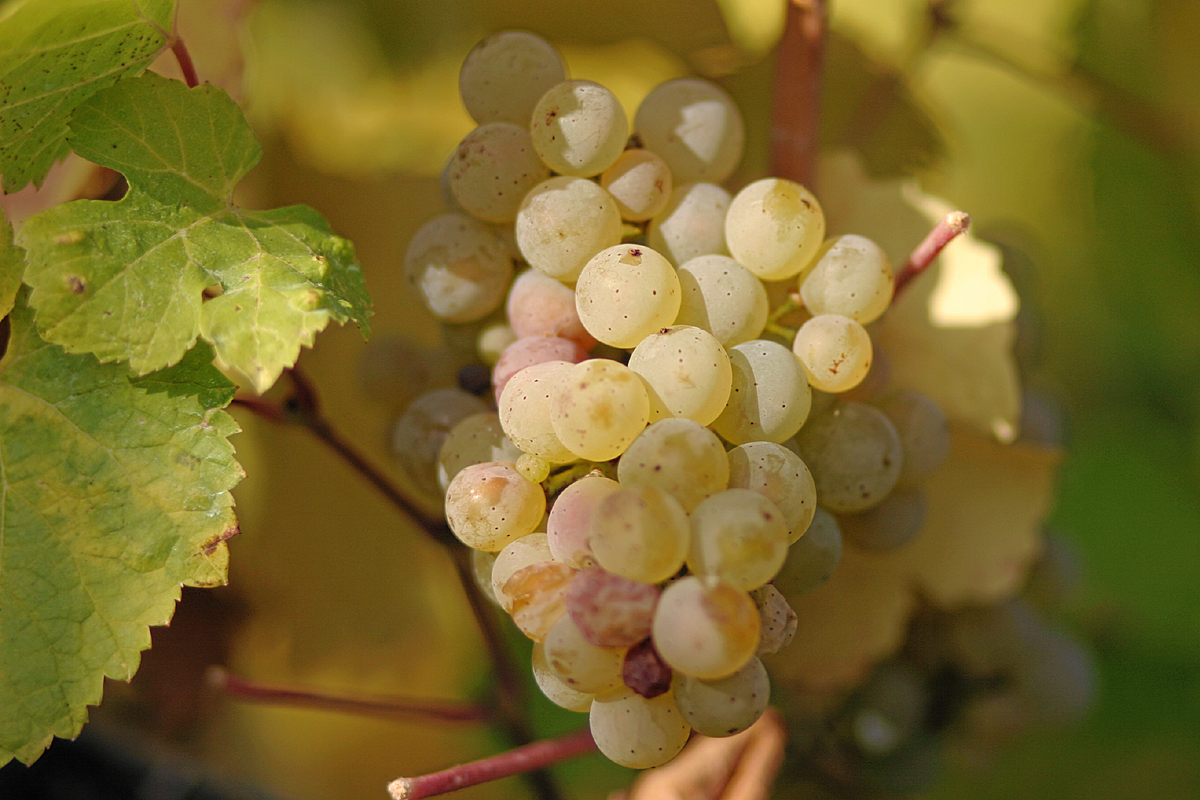
Chateau Grand Traverse's primary focus is Riesling.

Chateau Grand Traverse's primary focus is Riesling grapes, with many of the winemakers in the winery's history descending from prominent German wine-producing families in the Mosel and Pfalz regions. The O'Keefes have even developed a unique clone of Riesling that has adapted to the climate of northern Michigan. Today, the winery produces more than nine different bottlings of Riesling ranging a dry wine to sweet botrytized wines to ice wines that are allowed to freeze naturally on the vine before harvest. They also produce wine from other vinifera grapes include Chardonnay, Gamay, Gewürztraminer, Merlot, Muscat, Pinot noir, Pinot blanc, and Pinot gris.
