= Chateau Chantal =

Winery in Michigan, U.S.

Coordinates: 44.91945°N 85.502°W

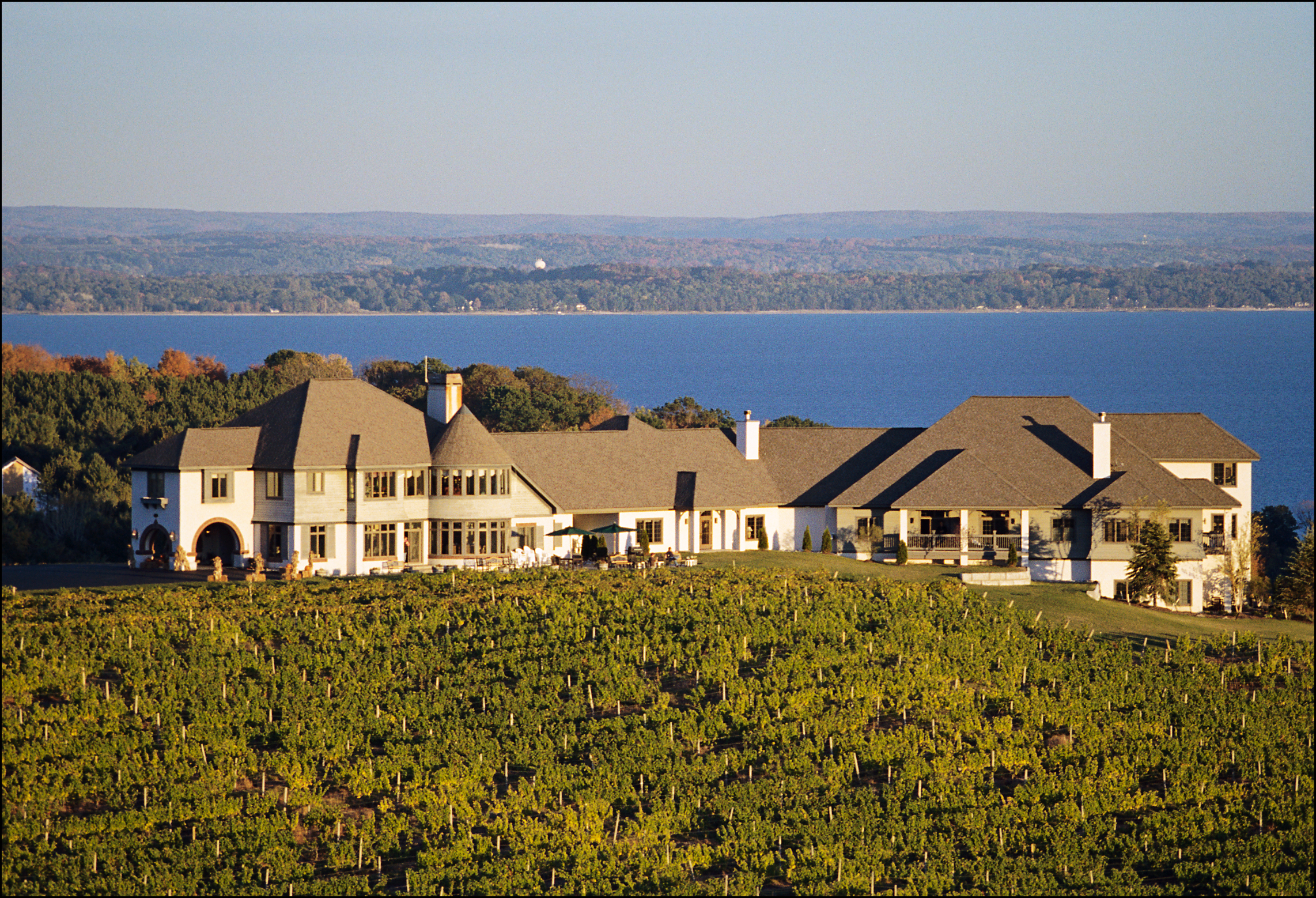
- Location: Old Mission Peninsula, Michigan, USA
- Appellation: Old Mission Peninsula AVA
- Formerly: Begin Orchards
- Founded: 1983
- First vintage: 1990
- Key people: Mark Johnson, Winemaker; Brian Hosmer, Winemaker; Elizabeth Berger, Operations Manager; Marie-Chantal Begin-Dalese, Director of Marketing
- Cases/yr: 15,000 - 20,000
- Known for: Late Harvest Riesling
- Varietals: Riesling, Chardonnay, Pinot noir, Cabernet Franc, Gewürztraminer, Blaufränkisch, Pinot blanc, Pinot grigio
- Other products: Ice Wine, Cerise (grape), Entice, http://www.chateauchantal.com/b-b 11 room B&B, http://www.chateauchantal.com/tours-events Tapas Tours, http://www.chateauchantal.com/tours-events Jazz at Sunset, http://www.chateauchantal.com/tours-events Cooking Classes
- Distribution: National
- Tasting: Open to the Public
- Website: http://www.chateauchantal.com/

Chateau Chantal is a winery located on the Old Mission Peninsula, only a few miles north of Traverse City, in Grand Traverse County, Michigan, United States. The chateau sits atop one of the highest points on the Old Mission Peninsula and has views of both East and West arms of Grand Traverse Bay. The winery is a European style chateau on a 64-acre (26 ha) estate. Chantal is in an official American Viticultural Area, one of five in Michigan, a state that specializes in vinifera, hybrid and native grape varieties. The Chateau has a tasting room, an eleven-room bed and breakfast, and a hospitality room where cooking classes and Jazz at Sunset are hosted.

== History ==
While Chateau Chantal was not incorporated until 1991, its history began in December 1983, when Robert and Nadine Begin formed Begin Orchards and purchased 60 acres of cherry orchards on the company's current site. Between 1984 and 1991, the Begins cleared much of this land, planted various grapes varieties and purchased additional land.

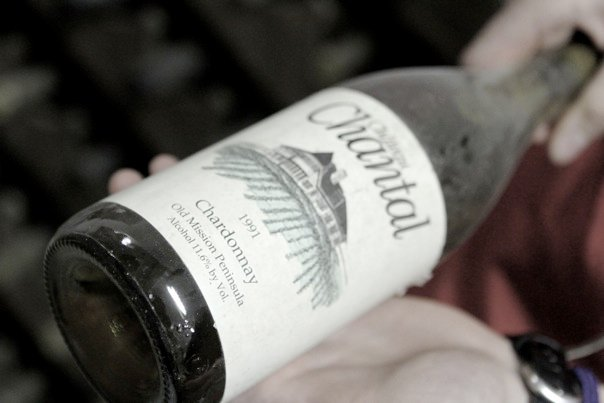
Bottle from the a harvest

In July 1990, Mr. Begin received a Special Use Permit from the Peninsula Township to operate the Chateau. In June 1991, the company was incorporated and in 1993 construction of the Chateau was completed. July 2003 saw the completion of an expansion which added eight B&B units to the original three, and a 2,000 square feet (190 m^{2}) Hospitality Room equipped for executive retreats and events. In late 2010, Chantal finished its second major expansion adding onto its cellar and tasting room. The addition adds 9,835 square feet (913.7 m^{2}) to the cellar, a 1,784 square feet (165.7 m^{2}) tasting room addition, and 2,730 square feet (254 m^{2}) patio space located on the roof of the cellar for seasonal use.

=== Argentina ===
Chantal purchased a vineyard in Argentina in 2003 to be able to offer a bold red wine to their lineup. The vineyard is in the province of Mendoza, Argentina. The proper name of the South American Vineyard is Chateau Chantal SA and it grows Malbec and Bonarda. Bonarda is a widely planted grape variety in Argentina used to make red wines. Malbec grapes are known for their robust tannins, and are thought of as being the grape of Argentina.

=== Founders Robert and Nadine Begin ===
Robert was a Roman Catholic priest for twelve years and Nadine, a former Felician Sister. The two went their separate ways from serving in the church and were married in 1974. They remain devout in their faith. Mr. Begin did post graduate studies in low-income housing under a one-year Ford Foundation Grant in the late 1960s. Further, Mr. Begin studied with the Smaller Company Management Program at the Baker School of Business, Harvard University, during the early 1970s. In 1972, he headed a construction business in the Detroit area. As a nun, Nadine earned a master's degree in home economics and taught for 22 years. From 1972 to 1983, Mr. Begin served as the CEO of Matvest, Inc., a construction management company with operations in nine major cities at the time of his resignation. He has been the sole proprietor of Begin Orchards since 1983. In 1991 the company was renamed Chateau Chantal after their daughter Marie-Chantal Begin. Mr. Begin is the company's founder and chairman of the board. Nadine wrote the book Feed my Lambs, Feed my Sheep - The Meals and Memories of a Lifetime. This book is half cookbook half memoir. Nadine is an accomplished cook and prepares many of the meals in the B&B herself. The book outlines her life story from growing up on a farm, joining the convent, marrying Bob and starting a family, and starting a winery in Northern Michigan. The book is filled with photos, prose, poetry and family recipes that she picked up in her journey that began in 1932.

=== Chateau Chantal as a corporation ===
The company was incorporated in 1991.

==== Governance ====
The company is governed by a five to nine member board of directors. Directors are elected by majority vote of shareholders voting at the company's annual meeting.

== Winemakers ==
=== Mark B. Johnson ===
Johnson was the company's founding wine maker and vice president. Mr. Johnson received his B.A. degree in social work from Michigan State University in 1974.

In 1983, he received a degree in viticulture and enology at the Federal Research Station and Institute in Geisenheim, Germany. From 1983 to 1993, Mr. Johnson was employed as a winemaker at Chateau Grand Traverse, a local winery. His employment with the Chateau Chantal began in 1993. Mr. Johnson passed in 2017.

=== Brian Hosmer ===
Hosmer was hired as a WineMaker at Chateau Chantal in 2007. Hosmer was born in Flint, and is a graduate of Michigan State University in Resource Development, he switched his area of study to winemaking and viticulture after several years at a teaching-assistant position in France, Spain, and The Netherlands—where he learned to appreciate wine. Hosmer did his post-graduate studies in the wine/viticulture program at MSU.

== Speciality Wines ==
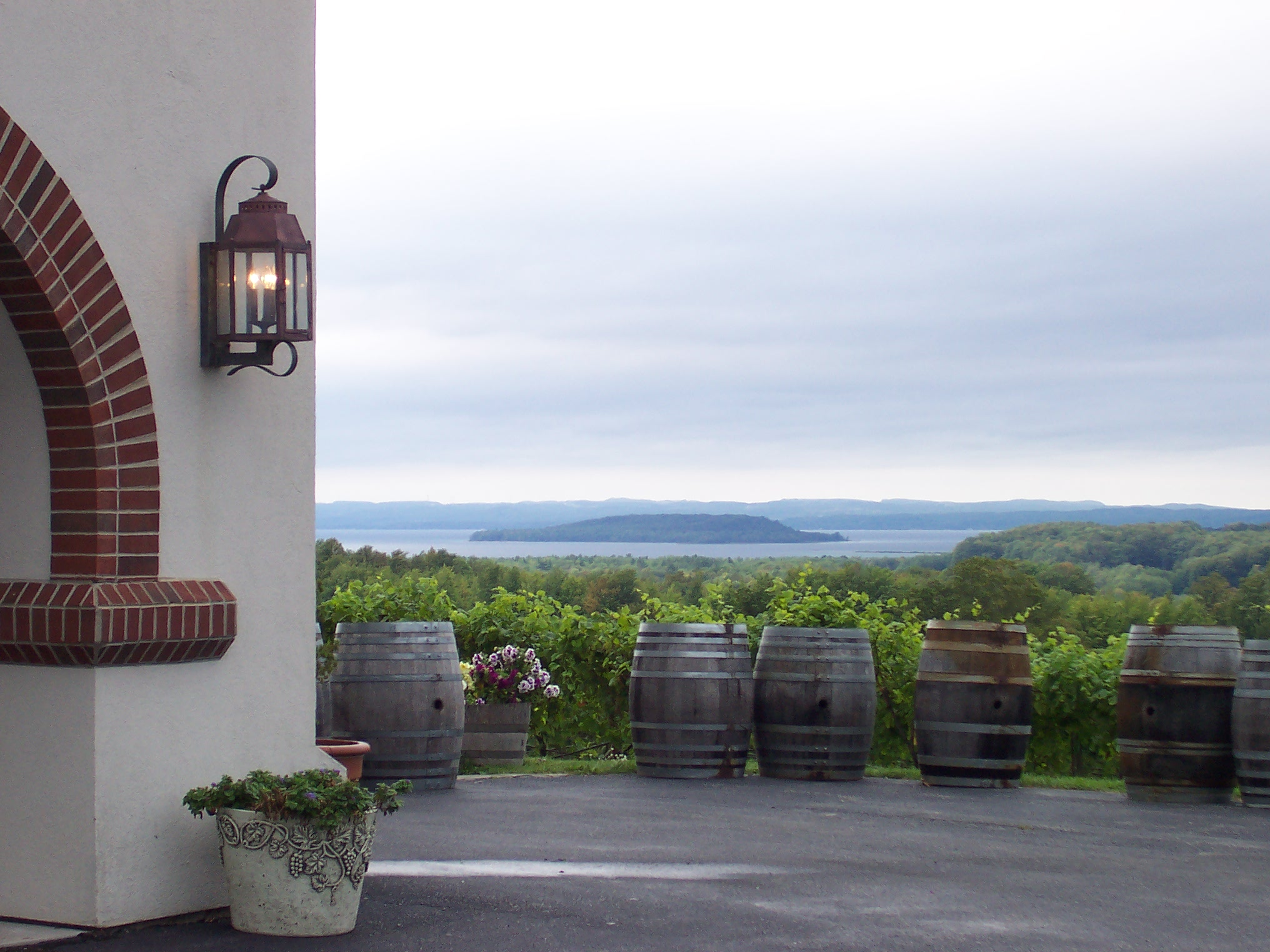
Power Island from Chateau Chantal

=== Ice Wine ===
On years when weather permits Chantal preserves a portion of the Riesling grapes to be harvested after the first hard freeze. Ice wine was first produced in Michigan in 1983 by Mark Johnson, who was working at Chateau Grand Traverse at the time. Chantal continues to follow the German laws that govern what wine qualifies as ice wine. German wine law is similar to the United States wine law and both dictate that ice wine must be picked only when the grapes are frozen on the vine. Because of the impossibility of predicting nature, making ice wine requires a great deal of luck. The grapes are generally picked in December after prolonged below freezing temperatures, to ensure they are frozen all the way through. But on warmer years the grapes cannot be picked until late into January or February. It can also be difficult to protect the grapes from birds and wind as they stay on the vine until after they are very ripe. Leaving the grapes on the vine until the first hard freeze ensures the grapes have reached their full ripeness while the ice captures the excess water leaving naturally concentrated sugars. Ice wine is sometimes referred to as liquid gold because of its high cost to make and purchase and because of the wine's intense sweetness.

The high cost of producing ice wine causes it to generate little profit for the winery. When asked why Chantal still makes it year after year Johnson replied "A good ice wine is almost certain to bring home a medal or two. I do think that natural ice wine is something incredibly special, and it's quite rare. And because they can't do it in California."

=== Fruit Wines ===
==== Entice ====
Entice is a blend of Chantal's ice wine and barrel aged grape brandy, making this a white port.

==== Cerise ====
Cerise is a blend of distilled whole tart cherries and the Chantal's cherry wine.

== Annual Events ==
=== Blossom Days ===
The Original Traverse City Cherry Festival began in 1925 as the Blessing of the Blossoms Festival. This Festival was originally an event held in early may to attract tourists to Northern Michigan to view the cherry blossoms. In 1931 the Michigan Legislature renamed the festival the National Cherry Festival, and moved the event to the summer. The Wineries of Old Mission Peninsula restarted this tradition in 2004 by hosting the Blossom Days Festival. The festival is a two-day event. The Blessing of the Blossoms is a non-denominational ceremony that takes place at Chateau Chantal. The 2011 Blossom days event took place on May 14–15 and the Blessing of the Blossoms was performed by Bishop Bernard Hedba.

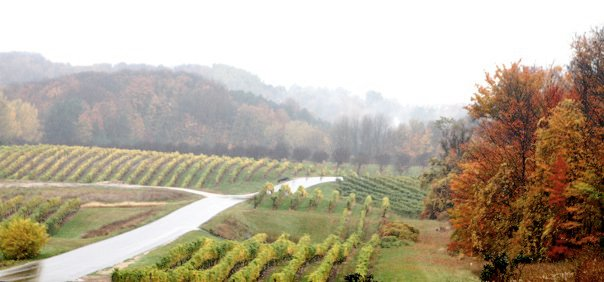
Vineyard on a fall day

=== Harvest Festival ===
In 2010 Chantal hosted its 11th Annual Harvest Festival in late October. This festival celebrates the successful completion of the growing season. The event includes wine tasting, rides through the vineyard, tours of the winery, and barefoot grape smashing.

== Notable Awards ==
Fox News Travel ranked Chateau Chantal among the top ten wine inns in the United States.

== Gallery ==
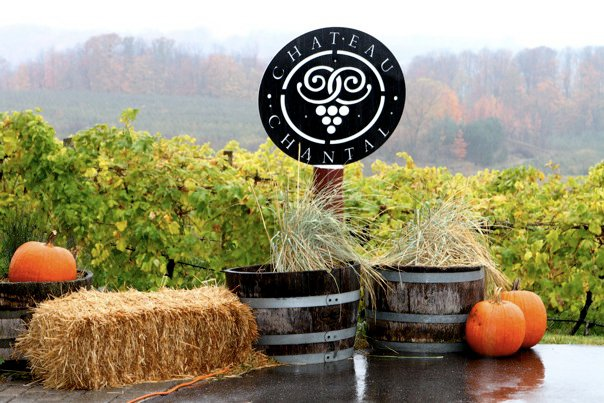

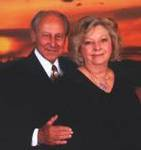
Bob and Nadine Begin

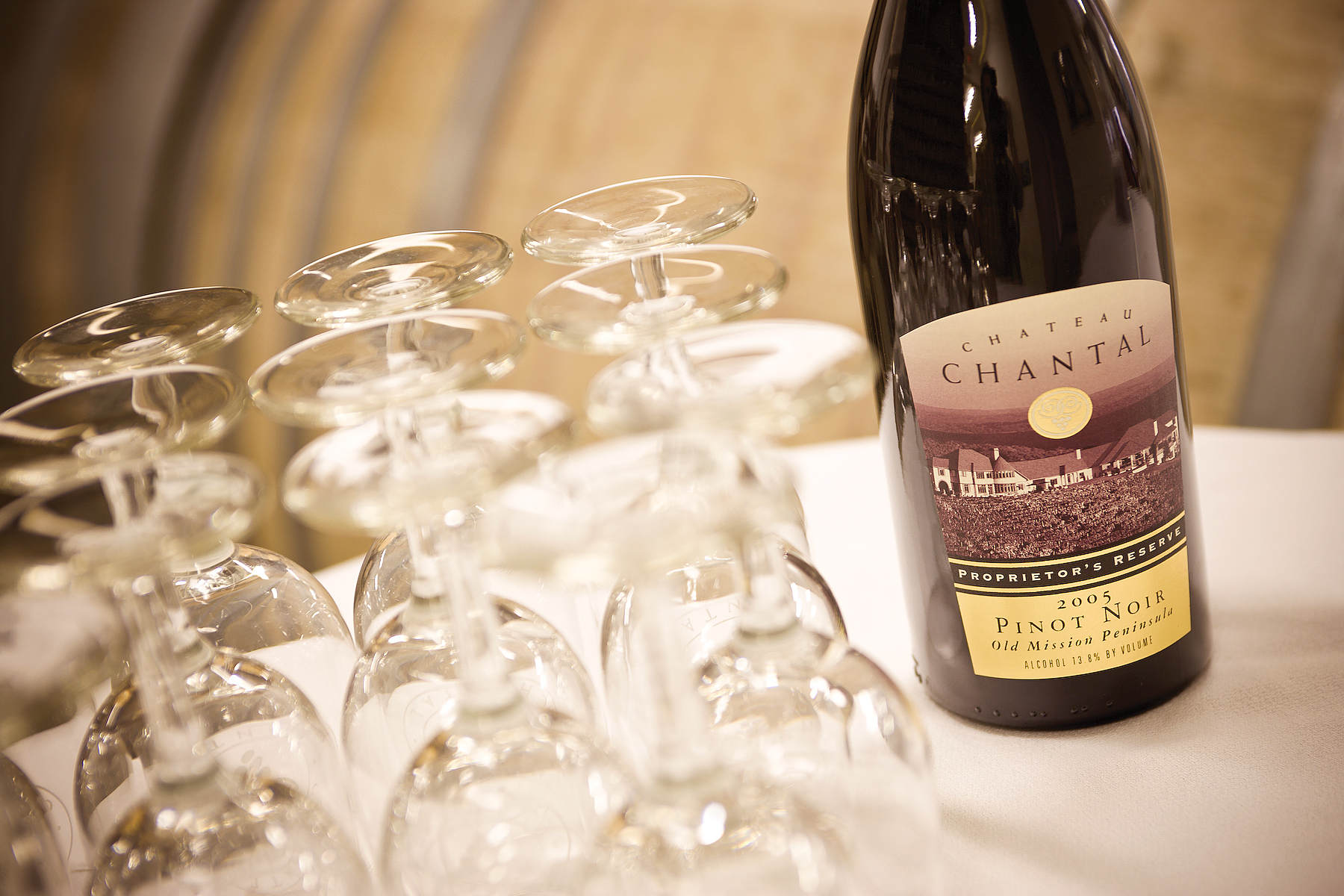
Tapas Tour Tasting
