= Fennville High School =

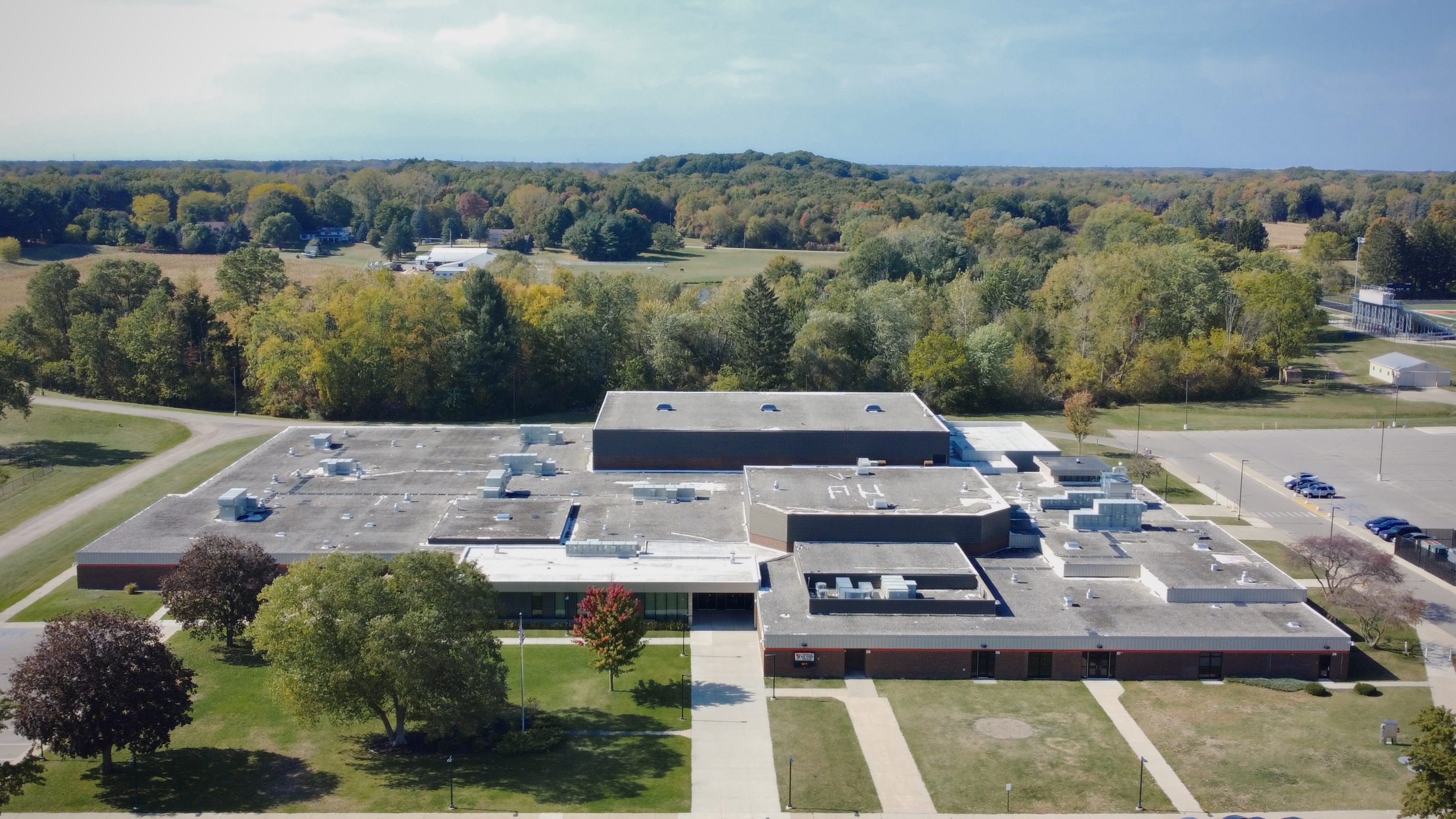
- Fennville High School

Location
- 5 Memorial Drive; Fennville, Michigan 49408; United States; 42°36′00″N 86°06′22″W

Information
- Type: Public high school
- Principal: Albert Lombard
- Teaching staff: 19.69 (FTE)
- Grades: 9-12
- Enrollment: 396 (2023–2024)
- Student to teacher ratio: 20.20
- Colors: Black and orange
- Team name: Blackhawks
- Website: School website

Fennville High School is a four-year comprehensive public high school serving students in grades nine through twelve from Fennville, Michigan, United States, as part of the Fennville Public Schools.

== Notable alumni ==
- J. Edward Hutchinson - US Congressman from Fourth Congressional District of Michigan 1963-1977

== See also ==
- List of high schools in Michigan
