= Michigan wine =

Wine made from grapes grown in Michigan, United States

Michigan
- Wine region
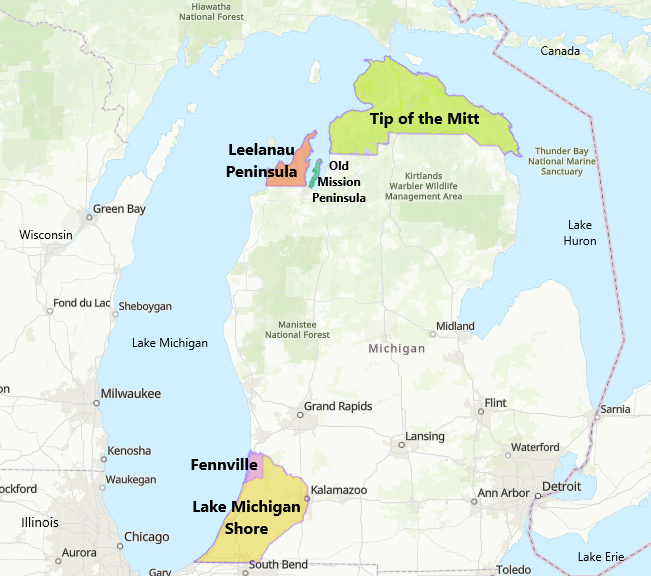
- Michigan AVAs
- Official name: State of Michigan
- Type: U.S. State Appellation
- Year established: 1837
- Years of wine industry: 93
- Country: United States
- Other regions in vicinity: Minnesota, Wisconsin
- Sub-regions: Fennville AVA, Lake Michigan Shore AVA, Leelanau Peninsula AVA, Old Mission Peninsula AVA, Tip of the Mitt AVA
- Climate region: Continental
- Total area: 36.2 million acres (56,539 sq mi)
- Size of planted vineyards: 3,375 acres (1,366 ha)
- Grapes produced: Baco noir, Cabernet Franc, Cabernet Sauvignon, Catawba, Cayuga, Chambourcin, Chancellor, Chardonnay, Concord, Gamay noir, Gewürztraminer, Kerner, Lemberger, Leon Millot, Malbec, Marechal Foch, Merlot, Niagara, Pinot blanc, Pinot gris, Pinot noir, Riesling, Sauvignon blanc, Seyval blanc, Syrah, Traminette, Valiant, Vidal blanc, Vignoles
- No. of wineries: 200+

Michigan wine refers to any wine that is made in the state of Michigan in the United States. As of 2020, there were 3,375 acres (1,366 ha) under wine-grape cultivation and over 200 commercial wineries in Michigan, producing 3 million US gallons (11,000,000 L) of wine. According to another count there were 112 operating wineries in Michigan in 2007.

Wine and enotourism were estimated in 2017 to have an economic impact of $5.4 billion, up from $300 million in 2007. Most of the quality bottled wine of Michigan is produced in the five American Viticultural Areas (AVAs) of Fennville AVA, Lake Michigan Shore AVA, Leelanau Peninsula AVA, Old Mission Peninsula AVA, and the Tip of the Mitt AVA. There are also a few disjunct wineries in every region of the state, including some in the Upper Peninsula that have opened over the past several years. In addition to grape wine, Michigan is a leader in the production of fruit wines such as cherry wine.

== History ==
The traditional wines of Michigan were sweet wines, often made from grape varieties native to North America, such as the Catawba, Concord, and Niagara, or from hybrid grapes partly developed by crossing native species with vinifera grapes. North American native grapes have the advantage of being adapted to local growing conditions, with consequent high fruit yield. In addition, growers can switch back and forth between the production of sweet wine and grape juice. Of Michigan's 14,600 acres (5,900 ha) under grape cultivation, only 12%, 1,800 acres (730 ha), were devoted to wine grapes as of 2007.

Michigan's wine industry dates from 1780s, Monroe the birthplace of Michigan wine industry. The state's first true wine region was established in Monroe at Frenchtown. The River Raisin flows for almost 139 miles in that area, and there were so many grapes growing naturally along its banks when French settlers arrived in the 1780s that they named it after the sun-dried fruit and were making good wine as many were farmers and many had trading posts. By the mid-1800s, a viable wine industry had been established in Monroe County.

With large plantings of Concord in the southwest, mostly for the Welch Grape Juice Company, the state was well positioned to enter wine production. Four large wineries (out of eleven wineries established by 1946) came to produce almost all Michigan wine: La Salle Wine and Champagne Company which was established in Windsor, Ontario, and moved to Farmington, Michigan; the Bronte Champagne and Wines Company of Hartford; Michigan Wineries (now Tabor Hill Winery) of Buchanan; and St. Julian Winery, which was also established in Windsor, Ontario, on the Canadian shore across from Detroit during Prohibition and moved to Paw Paw, Michigan, after repeal. To promote the local industry, Michigan law in the mid-20th century placed a tax of four cents per U.S. gallon on Michigan wine while other wine was taxed at 50 cents per U.S. gallon. Michigan wine of that era was, primarily, fermented to dryness, giving about 9% alcohol, and then fortified with California brandy to 16% alcohol. State laws considered this natural wine and allowed it to be sold in grocery and drug stores while fortified wines from out of state, produced to 18-20% alcohol, could only be sold from state liquor stores.

The wineries of Michigan specialized in sweet wine and fruit wine well into the 1970s. With the growth in demand, starting in the latter half of the 20th century, for locally grown and locally labeled U.S. fine wines, several existing Michigan makers of sweet wine experimented with upgrading their production, and new vintners entered the scene. Tabor Hill Winery, in southwest Michigan, opened in 1971 as the first Michigan winery specializing in vinifera wines. Only a few years later in 1974, Chateau Grand Traverse opened in the Traverse Bay region of Northern Michigan. A slow growth in the number of wineries and continued trials of different vinifera varieties continued well into the 2000s. Presently, various hybrid varieties are being looked at which could allow grape growing in the Upper Peninsula to expand significantly over the next several years.

== Regions ==
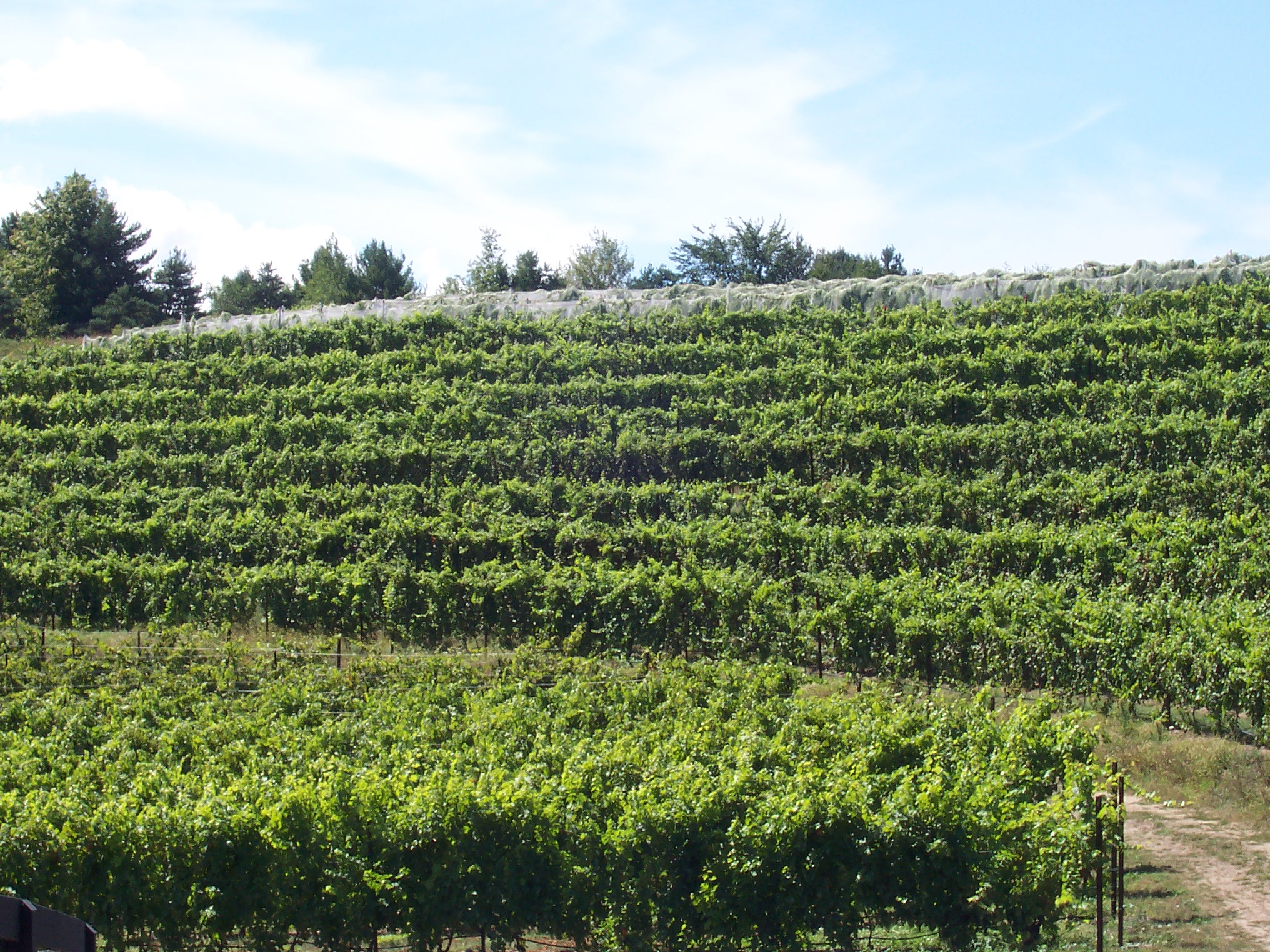
Leelanau Peninsula Vineyard

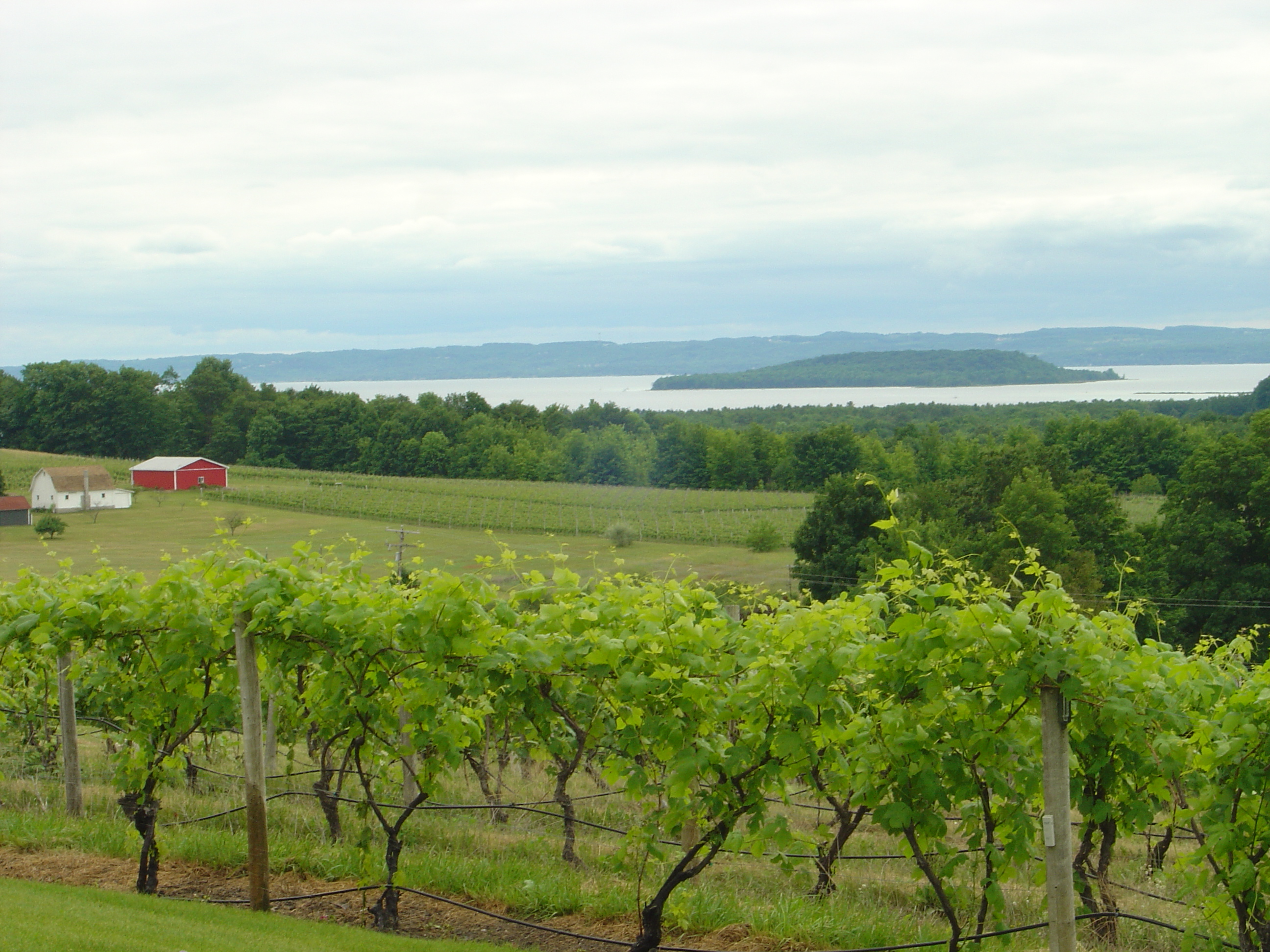
Chateau Chantal on Old Mission Peninsula

As of 2025, Michigan contains five American Viticultural Areas (AVAs), regions whose wines share similar and distinct characteristics: Fennville, Lake Michigan Shore, Leelanau Peninsula, Old Mission Peninsula, and Tip of the Mitt. All five regions are located in proximity to Lake Michigan, and almost all of Michigan's wine grapes are grown within 25 miles (40 km) of the lake. The lake effect provides a favorable microclimate compared to interior regions of the state. The northern wine regions have a 145-day growing season while the southern ones have a 160-day season.

The Greater Traverse City area, which includes the peninsulas of Leelanau and Old Mission, is one of the primary wine regions of Michigan. The soil is sandy, with good drainage, and a lake-dominated climate allows a longer growing season than in most of the U.S. Midwest. Fifty-one percent of Michigan's wine grapes, including much of the state's vinifera grapes, are grown in this area.

The same advantages exist, to a slightly lesser degree, on the eastern shore of Lake Michigan south of Grand Rapids in the Fennville and Lake Michigan Shore regions. Forty-five percent of Michigan's wine grapes are grown in this area.

Michigan’s cool-climate viticulture is subject to winter injury and related grapevine diseases. Michigan State University Extension reports that crown gall, caused by Agrobacterium vitis, is a significant disease of grapevines and is more prevalent in cool-climate production regions. The disease commonly develops following freeze damage or wounds to vine tissue. European Vitis vinifera cultivars are generally more susceptible, while hybrid and native grape varieties tend to show greater tolerance. Management strategies focus on prevention, including the use of clean planting material, resistant rootstocks, and practices that reduce vine injury.

== Grape varieties ==
Michigan is the fourth largest grape-growing state in America, with over 13,500 acres (5,500 ha) of vineyards. Much of the state's acreage is planted to varieties like Concord and Niagara, destined for juice production. Wine grapes represent 11% of total vineyard area. The 100,000 short tons of grapes produced in 2005, just 4,600 tons were used for wine-making. However, the proportion of vinifera grapes used in wine–making is increasing. In 2005, the wine industry pressed 2,640 tons of European vinifera grapes, 1,660 tons of hybrid varieties, and 300 tons of American varieties. European grapes grown include Cabernet Franc, Chardonnay, Gewürztraminer, Pinot noir, Merlot, Syrah, Pinot gris, and Riesling.

== Specialty wines ==
=== Ice wine ===
The climate of Greater Traverse City allows for the production of ice wine, which requires an early hard freeze so the fruit still on the vine can be harvested while frozen. A small number of wineries produce this style, although it is not possible every year. In 2002, for example, six Michigan wineries produced over 13,000 half-bottles of ice wine, a record at that time.

Ice wine was first produced in Michigan in 1983 by Mark Johnson, who at the time was working at Chateau Grand Traverse and is currently the head winemaker at Chateau Chantal. Northern Michigan wineries follow some of the German practices that govern what wine qualifies as ice wine. German law dictates that ice wine must be picked only when the grapes are frozen on the vine, while United States law allows for wine to be sold as ice wine if the grapes are picked and then artificially frozen. Because of the impossibility of predicting nature, making ice wine requires a great deal of luck. The grapes are generally picked in December after prolonged below-freezing temperatures, to ensure they are frozen all the way through. But in warmer years the grapes cannot be picked until late into January. It can also be difficult to protect the grapes from birds and wind as they stay on the vine until after they are very ripe.

=== Fruit wine ===
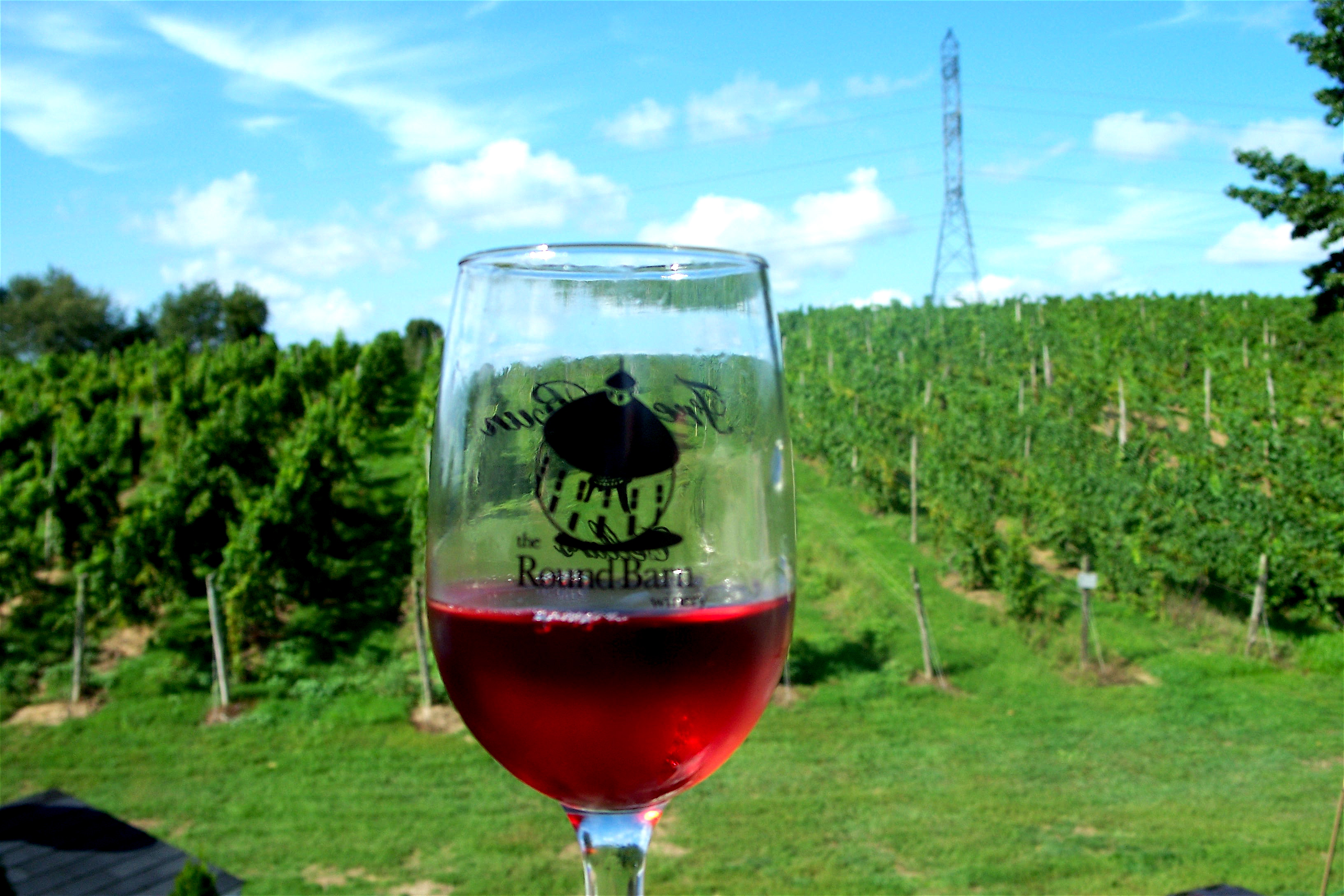
Cranberry wine in Lake Michigan Shore vineyard

Michigan is one of the foremost U.S. states in the production of diverse varieties of bottled, fermented fruit wine. Fruit wine has a long history in Europe, especially in regions such as Poland and the Baltic states where grapes do not easily grow. In Michigan, apple wine and cherry wine are produced in the highest volume, but other fruit juices are fermented as well. Michigan is the leading state for tart cherry production (many Traverse City vineyards were formerly cherry orchards); a number of Michigan wineries produce cherry wine, spice cherry wine, and cherry-grape blends. Michigan is a North American leader in the production of fortified fruit wines and eau-de-vie (fruit brandy).

== Ongoing issues ==
=== Tourism synergy ===
As with other states, the Michigan wine industry is seen as an attractive example of regional cuisine and is supported by tourists. More than 800,000 tourists visited Michigan wineries in 2005.

=== State support ===
The wine industry in Michigan is supported by an agricultural research program at Michigan State University, which began experimental vineyards around the state in 1970 and established a winery on campus in 1972. The Michigan Grape and Wine Industry Council was a state agency established in 1985 to promote and support Michigan wineries. In 2018 the Michigan Grape and Wine Industry Council was replaced by the Michigan Craft Beverage Council which sought to more robustly represent the entirety of craft (alcoholic) beverages in the state. The state government has declared May to be "Michigan Wine Month."

=== Future prospects ===
A warming trend in the climate of the Great Lakes region could increase Michigan vinifera productivity and lead to a higher profile for Michigan wines. However, Michigan vineyards, particularly vinifera vineyards, remain vulnerable to late spring and early fall cold snaps, such as the killing frost of March 2003, insufficient growing season heat to fully ripen the grapes, and rot or mildew originating from rainfall while the grapes are maturing. Consumption of Michigan wine has risen from 1.5% of all wine consumed in Michigan in 1997 to 5.2% in 2006, with the number of wineries rising from about 16 to 50 in the same period. Michigan liquor law revisions in 2005 affirmed the right of wineries to sell from their tasting rooms, ship wine directly to consumers, and sell directly to licensed retailers and restaurants, bypassing wholesale distributors.

In 2004, the Michigan Grape and Wine Industry Council (which rebranded to the Michigan Craft Beverage Council in 2018) set a goal of 10,000 acres (4,000 ha) of wine grape production and 3,000,000 cases of Michigan-produced wines annually by 2024, about 10 times current production. Only 1,500 acres were earmarked for wine grape production in 2004. In 2024, wine grape acreage in Michigan sat at 3,375 acres, more than double what it had been in 2004 but still short of the 10,000 acre goal. At the 2024 Dirt to Glass Conference, attendees and speakers reflected on reasons why the Michigan growers were short, and how to foster better collaboration amongst growers and those in the wine industry to increase wine grape specific growing land.

== Industry and events ==
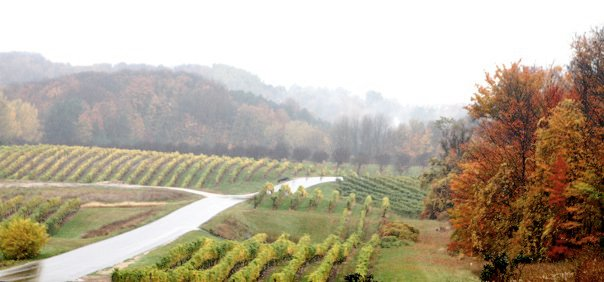
Autumn in northwest Michigan vineyard

=== Blossom Days ===
The Original Traverse City Cherry Festival began in 1925 as the Blessing of the Blossoms Festival. This festival was originally an event held in early May to attract tourists to Northern Michigan to view the cherry blossoms. In 1931 the Michigan Legislature renamed the festival the National Cherry Festival, and moved the event to the summer. The Wineries of Old Mission Peninsula revived this tradition in 2004 by hosting the Blossom Days Festival. The festival is a two-day event with a non-denominational ceremony taking place to bless the cherry and grape blossoms for the coming growing season. The 2011 Blossom Days event took place on May 14 and 15, and the Blessing of the Blossoms was performed by Bishop Bernard Hedba at Chateau Chantal.

=== Great Lakes Wine Festival ===
Starting in 2010, Michigan International Speedway (MIS) has hosted the annual Great Lakes Wine Festival. In 2011, 25 Michigan wineries and 17 breweries attended this event. The 2011 Great Lakes Wine Festival was a three-day event from Friday, May 20, through Sunday, May 22. The festival offers the opportunity to taste Michigan wine from all over the state while wineries demonstrate food pairings. MIS has camping available for festival goers to spend the entire weekend.

=== Paw Paw Wine and Harvest Festival ===
The Paw Paw Wine and Harvest Festival is a three-day event held on the second weekend of September in Paw Paw, Michigan.

=== Leland Wine & Food Festival ===
The Leland Wine & Food Festival in Leland, Michigan, started in 1986 and is still ongoing. Its most recent event was on June 14, 2025.

== Awards and recognition ==
In 2010, USA Today named Traverse City one of "10 great places for local wines".
