= Fennville Public Schools =

School district in Michigan, United States

Address
- 5 Memorial Drive Fennville, Allegan County, Michigan, 49408; United States

District information
- Grades: Pre-Kindergarten-12
- Superintendent: Albert Lombard
- Schools: 4
- Budget: $22,320,000 2022-2023 expenditures
- NCES District ID: 2614230

Students and staff
- Students: 1,219 (2024-2025)
- Teachers: 83.75 (on an FTE basis) (2024-2025)
- Staff: 185.25 FTE (2024-2025)
- Student–teacher ratio: 14.56 (2024-2025)

Other information
- Website: www.fennville.org

Fennville Public Schools is a public school district in West Michigan. It serves Fennville, Clyde Township, and parts of the townships of Casco, Ganges, Lee, Manlius, Saugatuck, and Valley.

== History ==
One of Fennville's early schools was a brick building originally built in 1894 and expanded several times. It was the only school in the district until Anna Michen Elementary was built in 1957.

A new high school was dedicated on May 11, 1963. The architect was G.E. Diekema of Kalamazoo. The 1894 building then became the junior high school.

After voters rejected a bond issue in 1971 to replace the antiquated junior high, the building began falling apart. Collapsing plaster and unstable floors made the district close certain rooms in October 1972. With the recommendation from the Michigan Department of Education to close the building, students were sent home early on October 8 for an emergency meeting of district staff. The school was then abandoned, and the junior high students began sharing the high school building, with each student body attending on a half-day basis.

The crisis ended when the present high school opened for classes on March 17, 1975. The previous high school then became the district's middle school.

Fennville Elementary opened in fall 2006, replacing Michen Elementary.

== Schools and buildings ==
Fennville schools share a campus on Memorial Drive, north of downtown Fennville.

Schools in Fennville Public Schools district
School	Address	Notes
Fennville High School	4 Memorial Drive, Fennville	Grades 9-12. Built 1975.
Fennville Middle School	1 Memorial Drive, Fennville	Grades 6-8. Built 1963.
Fennville Elementary	8 Memorial Drive, Fennville	Grades PreK-5. Opened fall 2006.
Fennville Alternative High School	4 Memorial Drive, Fennville	Alternative high school within Fennville High School, grades 9-12
Fennville Community Recreation	515 North Maple St., Fennville	Stand-alone recreation center open to the public. Opened spring 2007.
