= Lake Michigan Shore AVA =

American Viticultural Areas in Michigan

Coordinates: 42°11′27″N 86°17′12″W

Lake Michigan Shore
- Wine region
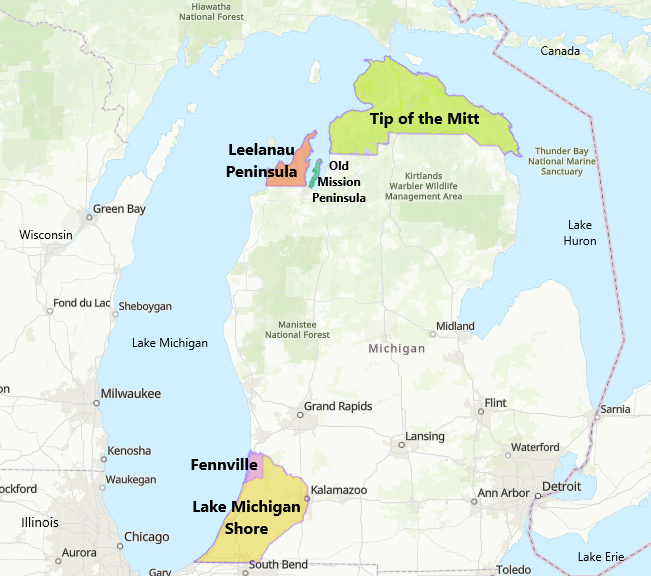
- Michigan AVAs
- Type: American Viticultural Area
- Year established: 1983
- Years of wine industry: 159
- Country: United States
- Part of: Michigan
- Other regions in Michigan: Leelanau Peninsula AVA, Old Mission Peninsula AVA, Tip of the Mitt AVA
- Sub-regions: Fennville AVA
- Growing season: 155 to 175 days
- Climate region: Region Ia-IIb
- Heat units: 2250–2620 GDD units
- Soil conditions: Sandy loam
- Total area: 1.28 million acres (0.52×10^{6} ha)
- Size of planted vineyards: 14,472 acres (5,857 ha)
- No. of vineyards: 930
- Grapes produced: Baco Noir, Cabernet Franc, Cabernet Sauvignon, Chambourcin, Chancellor, Chardonnay, Chelois, Concord, De Chaunac, Gamay Noir, Gewurztraminer, Kerner, Lemberger, Malbec, Marechal Foch, Marsanne, Merlot, Müller-Thurgau, Muscat Ottonel, Niagara, Petit Verdot, Pinot gris, Pinot Meunier, Pinot Noir, Riesling, Roussanne, Sauvignon Blanc, Seyval blanc, St. Vincent, Syrah, Traminette, Vidal Blanc, Vignoles, Viognier
- No. of wineries: 33

Lake Michigan Shore is an American Viticultural Area (AVA) located in southwestern corner of the state of Michigan bordered by Lake Michigan and entirely encompassing Berrien and Van Buren counties in addition to portions of Allegan, Kalamazoo and Cass counties. It was established as the nation's 46th and Michigan's third wine appellation on October 13, 1983, by the Bureau of Alcohol, Tobacco and Firearms (ATF), Treasury after reviewing the petition submitted by Charles W. Catherman Jr., vice president and winemaker of the St. Julian Wine Company, and Michael F. Byrne, winemaker of Warner Vineyards, proposing a viticultural area known as "Lake Michigan Shore".
The 1.28-million-acre (2,000 sq mi) area has specifically been known by two names, "Fruit Belt" and "Lake Michigan Shore", while also generally referred to as "Southwestern Michigan" or "Western Counties".

"Michigan's southwestern counties, behind the towering sand dunes of the Lake Michigan Shore and extending east and north to Kalamazoo are one of the great fruit-producing sections of the earth." Several state and national books on wine and grapes refer to this area generally as the area behind the sand dunes on the Lake Michigan shore. After carefully evaluating the petition for this viticultural area, ATF agreed that "Lake Michigan Shore" is the most appropriate name as the land borders the shore and is close to Lake Michigan including acreage 30 to 60 miles (48 to 97 km) inland because the entire area shares the same terroir most notably the tempering "lake effect" of Lake Michigan. At the outset, the area included nine commercial wineries, approximately 930 grape growers, and 14,472 acres (5,857 ha) under vine. The previously approved Fennville viticultural area lies within the northwest corner of the Lake Michigan Shore viticultural area.

== History ==
Lake Michigan Shore is the oldest modern commercial wine region and resident to over 90 percent of Michigan vineyards. Most of the vineyards are planted with labrusca varieties like Concord and Niagara. Thus, Lake Michigan Shore AVA vine acreage only amounts to a small percentage of the total, even though it still represents nearly half of Michigan's total wine production. It is believed that the first grapes grown in Michigan were planted in Van Buren County in 1867 by A. B. Jones in a small vineyard just outside the present village limits of Lawton. Since then grapes has consistently been a part of the agricultural brand of the area. Bob Hollis, the historian of the Van Buren County Historical Society, completed a work on grape growing and marketing in this area entitled Eighty Years of Marketing Grapes in Van Buren County. In this book, Hollis details the various companies which have, since 1901, been formed and located here in the heart of the Lake Michigan Shore grape region and verifies beyond doubt that this region has had significant importance as a viable and distinct viticultural area. He mentions that in 1901 and 1902 the first processing plants were being started here because "the tonnage of grapes has saturated the fresh fruit market which at that time was limited to about 200 miles [320 km] because there were no refrigerator railroad cars available that would permit grapes to be sold on any market 500 to 800 miles [800 to 1,290 km] distant. This practice would happen about five years later...." The region suitable for the growing of quality grapes was limited to the shore region in southwestern Michigan. Otherwise there would not have been a large market for the crop within a 200 miles (320 km) or even 800 miles (1,300 km) radius of this area.

There were many corporations formed in the early 1900s to process and market the grape crop produced in this region, most long since dismantled, even though several were of a large size. The October 1918 Lawton Leader gave the size of the J. Hungerford-Smith plant in Lawton as 700,000 gallons and as requiring 4,000 tons of grapes to fill. In that same year, 1918, the now largest grape juice processor in America came to Lawton in southwestern Michigan as they had expanded sales beyond what the grape growing regions of New York could supply. Since 1918 Welch's Grape Juice Company has made a significant portion of their products from southwestern Michigan grapes and today operates a plant here that consumes over 40,000 tons annually.

The first winery established in Van Buren County was founded in 1932 by William Houppert. Houppert selected this area for a winery because of experience gained from his father, Franz, a descendant of a several-generation winemaking family from France who had operated a winery in Indiana since 1850 and had, since 1889, purchased grapes from southwestern Michigan for his winery. William was so impressed by the quality of the grapes which he purchased from southwestern Michigan,'that it was a logical choice to move his winery to the area.

Since the repeal of Prohibition and the start of BW-MI-1 in Lawton, 50 wineries have been bonded in Michigan. Most of these have been or are currently located in the Lake Michigan Shore area. Those that did not or do not have bonded premises physically located here have historically been and currently are dependent upon this area for a significant percentage of their annual production, as the "Lake Michigan Shore" area produces 97.7% of the grapes grown in the state of Michigan. Over the course of 116 years of ongoing viticultural experimentation and 46 years of continuous viticulture, the boundaries of Lake Michigan Shore have been tested and re-tested. The net result of these efforts has confined the economically feasible growing region to its boundaries where "Lake Michigan Shore" is synonymous with grape growing in Michigan.

== Terroir ==
=== Geography and climate ===
The southwestern corner of Michigan, which is bordered on its western side and tremendously influenced by Lake Michigan, has, for over a century, been widely recognized as an important grape growing region. The petition contained substantial geographic and climatic information which distinguish the viticultural boundaries from surrounding areas, based on the fact that:

- The entire area receives the tempering lake effect of Lake Michigan. This lake effect moderates the winter and summer temperature extremes, and delays budding of the vines beyond the late spring frosts. The lake effect also causes generally uniform climatic conditions, since large bodies of water retain heat and cold and react slower to temperature fluctuations. The number of frost-free growing days in this area ranges from 155 to 175 days, normally during the period of May 10 through October 13. Immediately to the north and west, the cities of Holland and Jackson, respectively, the last and first frost-free dates of the growing season are May 25 through September 24. To the immediate south, South Bend, Indiana, the frost-free growing season is May 30 through September 30. Further, the South Bend areas has consistent January mean minimum temperatures of 2 to 4 °F (1.1 to 2.2 °C) lower than the proposed area. The significance of the lake effect bears out the 116 years history of grape-growing in the area and the fact that 97 percent of the State's grapes are grown in the proposed area. The USDA plant hardiness zone range is 6a except near enough to Lake Michigan in Berrien County where it is 7a.
- The western boundary, the eastern shore of Lake Michigan, is a natural boundary from which the area draws its name and receives the necessary lake effect which moderates the climate. The northern, eastern, and southern boundaries generally identify the extent to which the glacial moraine soil construction changes to till plain. This viticultural area encompasses a large area with generally uniform geographic and climatic features, as opposed to small microviticultural areas which exhibit very definitive geographic and climatic features such as the "Fennville" viticultural area which is located within this area in the northwest corner.

Lake Michigan Shore boundaries encompasses the smaller Fennville AVA and extends as far as 45 miles (72 km) inland from the lakeshore; however, the climate and glacial moraine soils are relatively similar throughout. The AVA has a warmer growing season, as much as two weeks longer than the Leelanau Peninsula AVA and Old Mission Peninsula AVA, which are both in Northern Michigan.

=== Soil ===
The composition of the soils within the area are not a definitive distinguishing factor. However, the topography of the area does distinguish the area because it is of "glacial moraine" construction as opposed to "till plain" construction for the surrounding areas. Glacial moraines are more conducive to grape growing because of the creation of needed air drainage, whereas till plains flatten out and are unsuitable for grape growing.

== Viticulture ==
The majority of grapes grown in Michigan are Concord grapes which are used in the production of grape juice and jelly. Approximately, 20 percent of the state's grapes are used in wine and account for 3,330 tons of grapes. The wine grapes grown in the Lake Michigan Shore viticultural area comprise 17 varieties of American, French hybrid, and vinifera grapes. The counties of Berrien and Van Buren account for 83 percent of the state's grape production, with the three remaining counties in the area comprising an additional 14 percent. The remaining three percent of the state's grape production primarily comes from the previously approved Leelanau Peninsula viticultural area 200 miles (320 km) north along the Lake Michigan shore.
