= Fennville AVA =

American Viticultural Area in Michigan

Coordinates: 42°34′48″N 86°08′41″W

Fennville
- Wine region
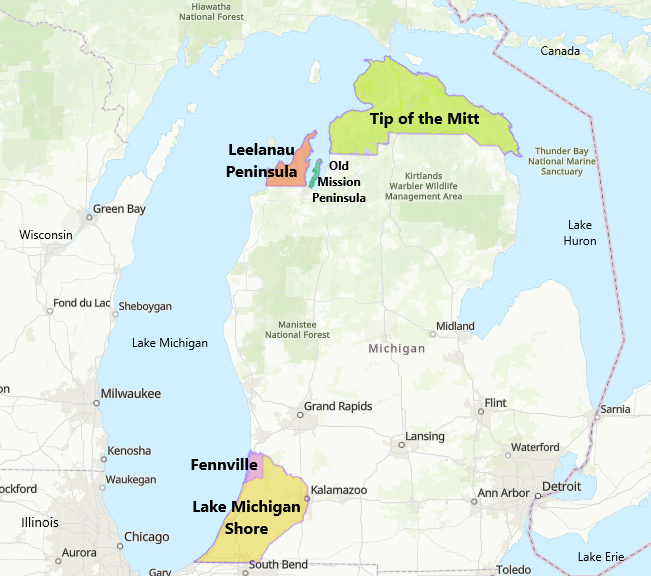
- Michigan AVAs
- Type: American Viticultural Area
- Year established: 1981
- Years of wine industry: 146
- Country: United States
- Part of: Michigan, Lake Michigan Shore AVA
- Growing season: 155 to 175 days
- Climate region: Region Ia-IIb
- Heat units: 1057–2743 GDD
- Soil conditions: Sandy loam
- Total area: 75,000 acres (117 sq mi)
- Size of planted vineyards: 500 acres (200 ha)
- No. of vineyards: 5
- Grapes produced: Aurora, Baco Noir, Cascade, Chelois, Cabernet Franc, Chardonel, Chancellor, Chambourcin, Maréchal Foch, Pinot Gris, Pinot Noir, Primitivo, Seyval, Riesling, Vignoles, Vidal Blanc
- No. of wineries: 6

Fennville is an American Viticultural Area (AVA) located in Allegan County, with a small portion in Van Buren County in southwestern Michigan. It was established as the nation's fourth and Michigan's initial wine appellation on September 18, 1981 by the Bureau of Alcohol, Tobacco and Firearms (ATF), Treasury after reviewing the petition submitted by William Welsch, President of Fenn Valley Vineyards, on behalf of local vintners, proposing the viticultural area to be named "Fennville."

The boundaries of the viticultural area, using landmarks and points of reference are as follows: starting at the most southwestern point, the intersection of the Black River as it empties into Lake Michigan at the city of South Haven; northward along the eastern shore of Lake Michigan approximately 20 miles (32 km) to the intersection of the Kalamazoo River;, easterly along the course of the Kalamazoo River for approximately 11.25 miles (18.11 km), seven miles (11 km) due east to 86°5' west longitude which is 1.25 miles (2.01 km) east of the community of New Richmond; south along 86°5' west longitude for 13.5 miles (21.7 km) to the intersection of the Middle Fork of the Black River;, westerly along the course of the twisting Middle Fork of the Black River until it joins the Black River, continuing west for a total of 12.5 miles (20.1 km) (10 miles (16 km) due west) to the starting point. It lies within the region specifically been known by two names, "Fruit Belt" and "Lake Michigan Shore", while also generally referred to as "Southwestern Michigan" or "Western Counties".

The soil in the Fennville area is different from surrounding areas, primarily glacial sandy soils. The area's climate is moderated by the nearby Lake Michigan, and few days in the summer growing season exceed 90 °F (32 °C). Grape growers in the area have had success with both Vitis vinifera and Vitis labrusca wine grapes. The hardiness zone range is 6a to 7a. In 1983, Fennville viticultural area became a sub-appellation encompassed within the vast 1.28-million-acre (2,000 sq mi) Lake Michigan Shore.

== Public hearing ==
A public hearing was held on February 3, 1981, in Douglas, Michigan, to gather evidence concerning the proposed area. The hearing included six scheduled speakers with an additional five persons giving testimony. The testimony given by these 11 persons and the information furnished with the petition is the criteria on which ATF based the decision.

== History ==
Fennville is the name of a small community of approximately 850 people which has been associated with the growing and processing of fruits since the late 1880s. In 1888 the Fruit Shippers Association was established and in 1897 the Fennville Fruit Company co-operative was organized. The community of Fennville has continued to be a majorcrossroad and trading center within the appellation. The name, Fennville, was well documented at the public hearing as a fruit growing region within the state of Michigan. One of the witnesses testified that the area was initially named after his great-grandmother whose name was Fenn. This same individual stated that his great-grandfather operated a woodmill under the name "Fennmill". Another witness gave testimony that the current name "Fennville" came about as a mistake in printing of the schedule by a railroad company who refused to correct the mistake. Witnesses also presented testimony that the area has a history dating back over 100 years for growing various fruits, including grapes for the production of wine. One witness stated that 100 years ago, his family grew grapes and sold them to wine merchants in Chicago. Another person verified that he personally knew of 27 different farms in the area that commercially grew grapes for either juice, jelly or wine.

In 1973, William Welsch bought an old, abused 230-acre (93 ha) fruit farm with diseased orchards and junk yard. After removing the trees and building up the soil, the property was converted into Fenn Valley Vineyards. At the outset, there were seven of these original 27 farms growing grapes commercially. Proprietors of two wineries, one located in the proposed area and one located 50 miles (80 km) south, gave testimony as to the differences in character and taste of the same type of grapes grown in the two areas. After evaluating the testimony presented and the written comments, ATF determined the historical and current evidence supports the name of the viticultural area as being a distinct grape-growing region.

== Terroir ==
Fennville AVA boundaries are distinguished on three sides by natural features: the Kalamazoo River on the north, the Black River and Middle Fork of the Black River on the south, and Lake Michigan's eastern shore on the west. The majority of the area consists of rolling terrain within a 650 to 700 feet (200 to 210 m) elevation and forms a natural barrier. Because the terrain is rolling, excellent air drainage into the surrounding lowlands of cold air on frosty nights and during severe cold spells results in a 2 to 4 °F (1.1 to 2.2 °C) higher temperature on the higher grape growing areas than in the lowlands.

The entire area receives the tempering lake effect of Lake Michigan. Its climate is distinguished from the surrounding area by a more moderate high and low temperature range attributed to its proximity to Lake Michigan and the protecting sand dunes. This lake effect moderates the winter and summer temperature extremes, and delays budding of the vines beyond the late spring frosts. The lake effect also causes generally uniform climatic conditions, since large bodies of water retain heat and cold and react slower to temperature fluctuations. The number of frost-free growing days in this area ranges from 155 to 175 days, normally during the period of May 10 through October 13. The higher elevations of the Fennville area have been producing fruit since the mid-1800s, including peaches, apples, pears, plums, cherries, and grapes. Proximity to Lake Michigan moderates both winter and summer temperatures by as much as 10 °F (5.6 °C). Thus, winter minimums seldom are registered below −10 °F (−23 °C) and summer maximums seldom above 90 °F (32 °C). Higher winter minimums permit the winter survival of most suitable wine grape varieties; lower summer maximums prevent the sun burnt grape flavors from developing here.

The area generally consists of sandy loam soil and rolling terrain which is well drained and ideal for growing peaches, apples, cherries, plums, pears, and grapes, especially winegrapes.
