= Leelanau Township, Michigan =

- Civil township
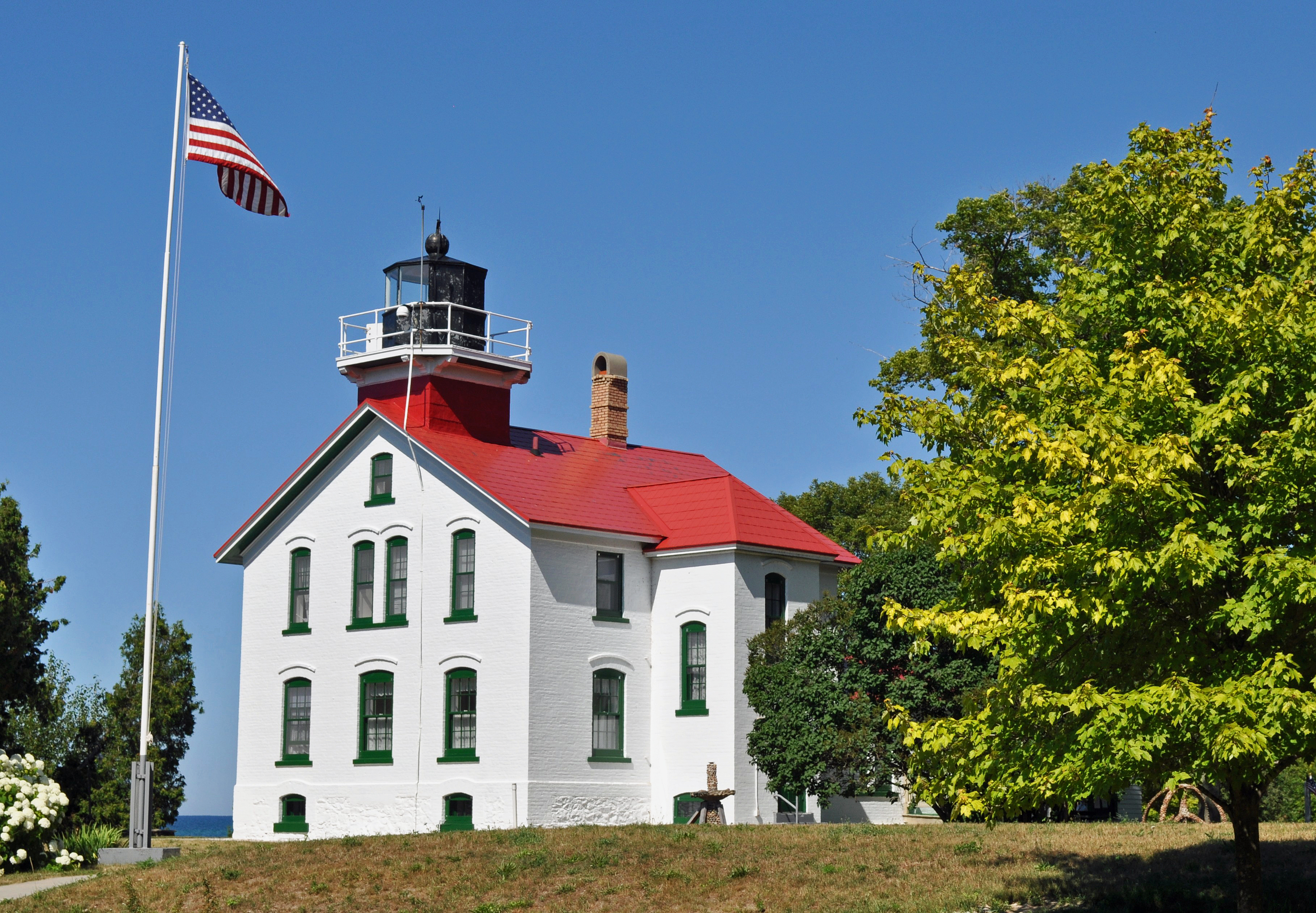
- Grand Traverse Light, within Leelanau State Park, on the shore of Lake Michigan.

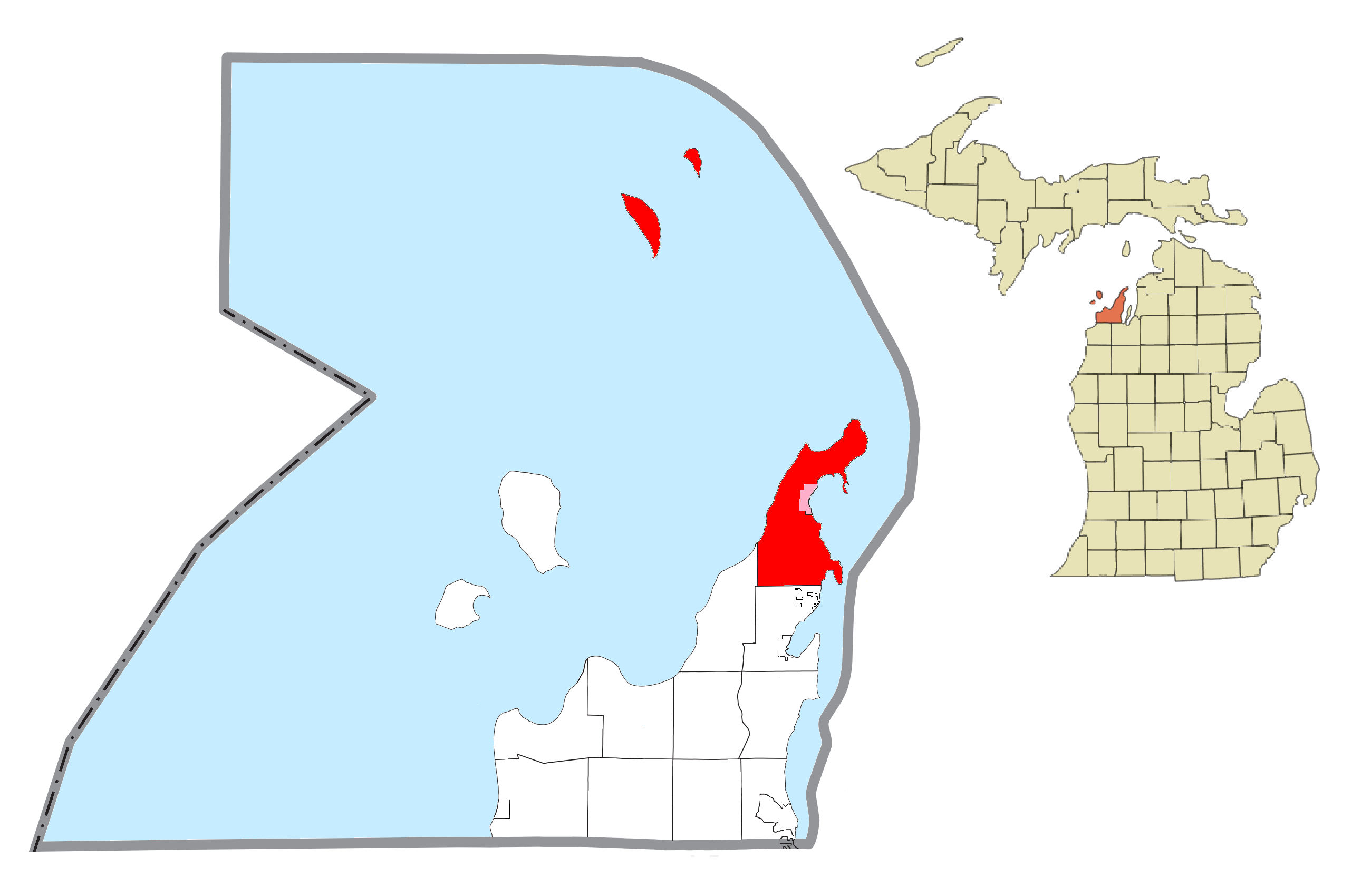
- Location within Leelanau County (red) and the administered village of Northport (pink)

- Location within the State of Michigan Leelanau Township (the United States)
- Coordinates: 45°5′0″N 85°38′30″W
- Country: United States
- State: Michigan
- County: Leelanau

Area
  - Total: 227.6 sq mi (589.4 km^{2})
  - Land: 49.2 sq mi (127.5 km^{2})
  - Water: 178.3 sq mi (461.9 km^{2})
- Elevation: 909 ft (277 m)

Population (2020)
  - Total: 1,552
  - Density: 44/sq mi (16.8/km^{2})
- Time zone: UTC-5 (Eastern (EST))
  - Summer (DST): UTC-4 (EDT)
- ZIP codes(s): 49670 (Northport); 49674 (Omena P.O. Box); 49682 (Suttons Bay)
- Area code: 231
- FIPS code: 26-46700
- GNIS feature ID: 1626601
- Website: https://leelanautownshipmi.gov/

Leelanau Township (/ˈliːlənɔː/ LEE-lə-naw) is a civil township of Leelanau County in the U.S. state of Michigan. At the northern tip of the Leelanau Peninsula, Leelanau Township is part of Northern Michigan, and is home to the village of Northport. Leelanau Township also includes the Fox Islands, as well as mainland shorelines on both Lake Michigan and Grand Traverse Bay. The township population was 1,552 at the 2020 census.

== Communities ==
- Cherry Home, in the center of the township's cherry orchards, had a post office from 1919 until 1931.
- Gill's Pier, or Gills Pier was a settlement at 45°05′20″N 85°41′02″W along Lake Michigan in the southwest of the township. The community took its name from the William Gill and Son lumber mill. A post office operated from January 22, 1883, until January 15, 1908. At its peak, in the 1890s, Gill's Pier had 12 houses, a post office, and a general store. The community, now mostly a memory, has been replaced by more vacation and year-round houses overlooking the lake. However, the name still appears on maps and lives on in the Gill's Pier Vineyard and Winery.
- Northport is a village on the Grand Traverse Bay side of the township. The Northport post office with ZIP Code 49670 also serves most of Leelanau Township.
- Northport Point is an unincorporated community within the township.
- Omena is an unincorporated community in the southeast part of township on the Grand Traverse Bay.
- Onominese is a ghost town, originally an Odawa settlement.
- St. Wenceslaus Church, named for Wenceslas I, Duke of Bohemia, a Roman Catholic Church founded nearby by immigrants from Bohemia who worked at the Leland Lake Superior Iron Foundry and at the Gills Pier sawmill also remains. After the Holy Trinity Church in Leland burned down in 1880, the first wood-frame church was built in 1890 and the cemetery was established. Church membership had doubled by 1908 and a brick structure replaced it in 1914. The two church buildings stood side by side until the autumn of 1963 when the frame structure was razed.

== Geography ==
According to the United States Census Bureau, the township has a total area of 227.6 square miles (589 km^{2}), of which 49.2 square miles (127 km^{2}) is land and 178.4 square miles (462 km^{2}) (78.37%) is water.

Leelanau Township forms the very tip of the Leelanau Peninsula, a roughly-triangular peninsula extending off of the Lower Peninsula of Michigan into Lake Michigan. This forms Grand Traverse Bay, which is to the east of the township.

The uninhabited Fox Islands are administered as part of Leelanau Township.

At the northernmost point of Leelanau Township is Leelanau State Park, which includes the Grand Traverse Lighthouse.

=== Major highways ===
- M-22 has two legs within the township, with one running north–south paralleling Grand Traverse Bay, and another running southwest–northeast paralleling Lake Michigan. M-22 continues south along both shorelines until reaching Traverse City or Manistee.
- M-201 is a short spur of M-22 that runs into the village of Northport. It continues north as a county road toward Leelanau State Park.

== Demographics ==
As of the census of 2000, there were 2,139 people, 903 households, and 634 families residing in the township. The population density was 43.5 inhabitants per square mile (16.8/km^{2}). There were 1,737 housing units at an average density of 35.3 per square mile (13.6/km^{2}). The racial makeup of the township was 92.85% White, 0.28% African American, 3.13% Native American, 0.09% Asian, 2.52% from other races, and 1.12% from two or more races. Hispanic or Latino of any race were 7.01% of the population.

There were 903 households, out of which 23.4% had children under the age of 18 living with them, 62.0% were married couples living together, 5.8% had a female householder with no husband present, and 29.7% were non-families. 26.4% of all households were made up of individuals, and 12.1% had someone living alone who was 65 years of age or older. The average household size was 2.28 and the average family size was 2.71.

In the township the population was spread out, with 19.8% under the age of 18, 4.8% from 18 to 24, 18.5% from 25 to 44, 30.6% from 45 to 64, and 26.3% who were 65 years of age or older. The median age was 48 years. For every 100 females, there were 97.1 males. For every 100 females age 18 and over, there were 93.6 males.

The median income for a household in the township was $42,112, and the median income for a family was $50,962. Males had a median income of $30,726 versus $24,671 for females. The per capita income for the township was $23,799. About 5.0% of families and 8.6% of the population were below the poverty line, including 10.9% of those under age 18 and 8.6% of those age 65 or over.
