= M-201 (Michigan highway) =

State highway in Leelanau County, Michigan, United States

M-201
- M-201 highlighted in red

Route information
- Maintained by MDOT
- Length: 1.467 mi (2.361 km)
- Existed: by April 15, 1949–present

Major junctions
- South end: M-22 in Northport
- North end: CR 640 north of Northport

Location
- Country: United States
- State: Michigan
- Counties: Leelanau

Highway system
- Michigan State Trunkline Highway System; Interstate; US; State; Byways
← M-199	→ M-203

M-201 is a state trunkline highway in the US state of Michigan that serves as a spur route for the village of Northport near the northern tip of Leelanau County. The trunkline zig-zags through to provide a path through the village, connecting with the county road that provides access to Leelanau State Park. The highway was first shown on state maps in the late 1940s, and remains unchanged since.

== Route description ==
M-201 starts on the south side of the Northport at M-22 and runs north on Shabwasung Street. The highway turns east onto Main Street for one block; the area in town is predominantly residential. At the intersection with Waukazoo Street, the trunkline turns north until it meets Nagonaba Street where it runs west for a block before turning north onto Mill Street, passing near the marina. Heading out of the village, the highway crosses Northport Creek and passes some small farms. The designation ends at the village limits just south of the three-way intersection of Mill Street, County Road 640 (CR 640), and East Peterson Park Road. CR 640 continues northward to Leelanau State Park at the tip of the Leelanau Peninsula.

Like other state highways in Michigan, M-201 is maintained by the Michigan Department of Transportation (MDOT). In 2011, the department's traffic surveys showed that on average, 2,245 vehicles used the highway daily. No section of M-201 is listed on the National Highway System, a network of roads important to the country's economy, defense, and mobility.

== History ==
The entire routing was transferred to state control at an earlier date, but it would first appear on the state highway map published on April 1, 1949. The highway remains unchanged since designation.

== Major intersections ==
The entire highway is in Leelanau County.

Location	mi	km	Destinations	Notes
Northport	0.000	0.000	M-22 / LMCT – Traverse City, Leland	
Northport–Leelanau Township village line	1.467	2.361	CR 640 – Leelanau State Park	Roadway continues north as Mill Street and Woolsey Lake Road
1.000 mi = 1.609 km; 1.000 km = 0.621 mi
