= Northport Point, Michigan =

- Unincorporated community
- Location within the state of Michigan Northport Point (the United States)
- Coordinates: 45°08′52″N 85°33′40″W
- Country: United States
- State: Michigan
- County: Leelanau
- Township: Leelanau
- Founded: 1899
- ZIP code(s): 49670
- Area code: 231

Northport Point is an unincorporated community in Leelanau County, Michigan.

== History ==
It is located at the tip of the Leelanau Peninsula and was developed over 100 years ago as a recreational and vacation destination. Founded in 1899, Northport Point became a permanent summer mecca for many big-city families from the Midwest and the East Coast. While there are a few year-round residences, Northport Point is generally a summer community of 100 homes on a wooded peninsula surrounded by the waters of Grand Traverse Bay.

The community was named for its location across from Northport on Grand Traverse Bay.

Northport Point contains a nine-hole golf course that has hosted several U.S. presidents and senators.

"It is a fortunate thing for all of us who love Northport Point, that, during the Glacier Period, Mother Nature graciously deposited our beautiful boulders and left intact the Peninsula which is today Northport Point. Had it not been for this geological phenomenon this spot would not exist."

- Jack Oliver
