= Northport Public School =

Location
- Northport, Michigan; United States
- Coordinates: 45.1287°N 85.6195°W

Information
- Type: Public, Coeducational [K-12]
- Established: 1884
- School district: Northport Public School
- Superintendent: Neil Wetherbee
- Teaching staff: 16.33 (FTE)
- Grades: PreK-12
- Student to teacher ratio: 7.72
- Colors: Blue and Gold
- Athletics conference: Cherryland Athletic Conference
- Team name: Wildcats
- Accreditation: North Central Association of Colleges and Schools
- Website: www.northportps.org

Northport Public School is a K-12 public school in Northport, Michigan, located at 104 Wing Street. It is one of seven high schools in Leelanau County. The K-12 enrollment comprises approximately 150 students. Northport is located in the Northport Public Schools school district. Northport offers classes for students in grades kindergarten–12. Additionally, students are given the option to dual enroll and attend classes at Northwestern Michigan College or the Traverse Bay Area Intermediate School District. In addition to the dual enrollment program, AP Biology and English classes are offered.

== Extracurricular activities ==
Youth Advisory Council is a student group organized under the Leelanau Township Community Foundation. Through a matching grant from the W.K. Kellogg Foundation, YAC was created to offer young students the opportunity to volunteer and learn about philanthropy. The Youth Advisory Council recommends grants to the Leelanau Township Community Foundation, where the grant is either approved or denied by the board.

Art Attack is new to Northport as of 2011. It is the after-school art club in which students spend time raising funds to go on trips to New York, Grand Rapids, and San Francisco. Its fundraisers are all art-related.

== Fine arts ==
Northport has a high school and middle school drama program that each put on two shows a year. The performances are free to the public and are held in the school's auditorium, which seats close to 400 people. There is a fall and spring production. The high school, under the direction of teacher Donna Wilson, has produced "The Magician's Nephew", "Bye Bye Birdie", "1984" and "Sherlock Holmes and the Case of the Jersey Lily". The middle school has also been a part of theater, putting on shows such as "Anne Frank and Me" in 2010.

Northport also has an art program for K-12 students. The teacher, Jenny Evans, offers high school art, community art, and photography as well as teaching art fundamentals to kindergarten through eighth grade. The art room has a printing press and a screen printing studio which includes a dark room and spray out booth. Northport student art is also a part of the local annual journal, Exposures.

== Sports ==
Northport competes in basketball, soccer, and volleyball. There is a middle school boys and girls basketball team, as well as an elementary girls team. JV and varsity basketball are also offered for both boys and girls. Boys varsity soccer is played in the fall and serves as the homecoming game. There is a girls middle school, JV and varsity volleyball team as well.
