= Grand Traverse Light =

Lighthouse in Michigan, United States

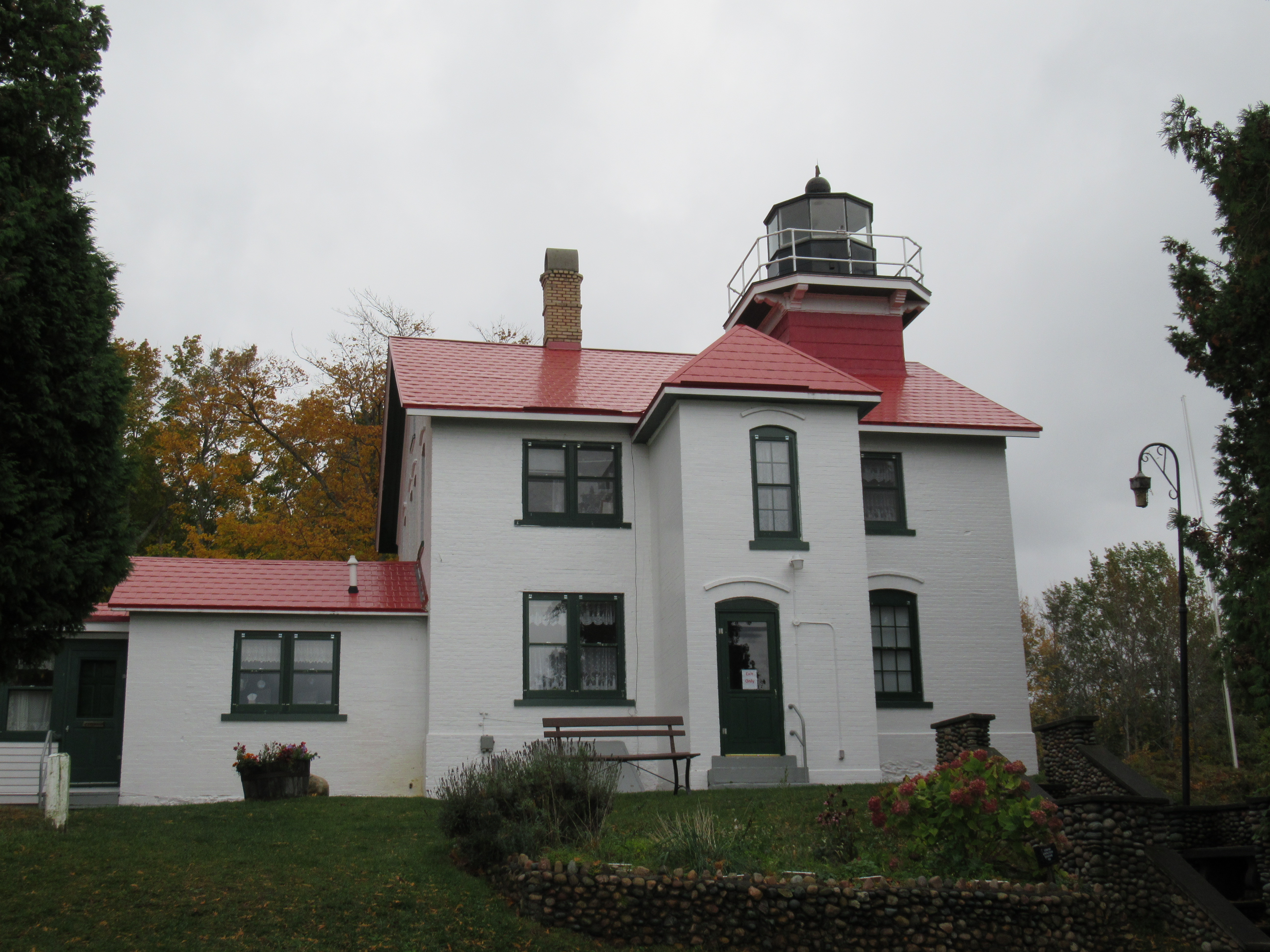
- Grand Traverse Light in October 2020
- Location: Leelanau Peninsula, Michigan
- Coordinates: 45.21°N 85.55°W

Tower
- Constructed: 1852
- Foundation: Dressed stone and timber
- Construction: Brick, wood, and iron
- Automated: 1972
- Height: 41 feet (12 m)
- Shape: Nine-sided on roof of dwelling/Flemish revival
- Markings: Red w/black trim
- Heritage: National Register of Historic Places listed place

Light
- First lit: 1852
- Deactivated: 1972
- Focal height: 47 feet (14 m)
- Lens: Fifth order Fresnel lens (original), DCB 24 Aerobeacon (current)
- Range: 7 nautical miles (13 km; 8.1 mi)
- Grand Traverse Light Station
- U.S. National Register of Historic Places
- Location: Leelanau Peninsula, Northport, Michigan
- Area: 3 acres (1.2 ha)
- Built: 1858
- MPS: U.S. Coast Guard Lighthouses and Light Stations on the Great Lakes TR
- NRHP reference No.: 84001799
- Added to NRHP: July 19, 1984

Grand Traverse Light is a lighthouse in the U.S. state of Michigan, located at the tip of the Leelanau Peninsula, which separates Lake Michigan and Grand Traverse Bay. It marks the Manitou passage, where Lake Michigan elides into Grand Traverse Bay. In 1858, the present light was built, replacing a separate round tower built in 1852. The lighthouse is located inside Leelanau State Park, 8 miles (13 km) north of Northport, a town of about 650 people. This area, in the Michigan wine country, is commonly visited by tourists during the summer months.

== History ==
Some call this "Cat's Head Point Light." It is also locally called Northport Light, in honor of the nearby town of Northport.

The first version of this light, which no longer exists, was ordered built by President Millard Fillmore in July 1850. A brick tower with separate keeper's quarters was constructed at a site east of the present Lighthouse in the state park campground. This first house and tower were deemed inadequate and razed in 1858 when the present structure was built. Still visible is a portion of the lighthouse foundation and the original tower site was located in 1999.

The 1858 light is listed in the National Register of Historic Places, Reference #84001799, Name of Listing: GRAND TRAVERSE LIGHT (U.S. COAST GUARD/GREAT LAKES TR). It is also on the State List/Inventory having been listed in 1991. Alpena, Michigan's Fourth Order Fresnel Lens is on display in the lighthouse keeper's house. The complex is listed as Michigan Registered Site S0615, and a state historical marker was erected in 1993.

Today, one can tour the restored lighthouse resembling a keeper's home of the 1920s and 1930s. Exhibits on area lighthouses, foghorns, shipwrecks and local history are located in the Lighthouse and Fog Signal Building. The restored air diaphone foghorn is demonstrated throughout the year, and visitors can climb the tower for views of Lake Michigan. The surrounding shoreline has accessible albeit rocky beaches one can visit. The lighthouse is inside of Leelanau State Park which contains campsites and other amenities, and requires either payment or a Michigan Recreation Passport to enter. A separate admission fee is charged to enter the lighthouse itself.
