= Port Oneida Rural Historic District =

- U.S. National Register of Historic Places
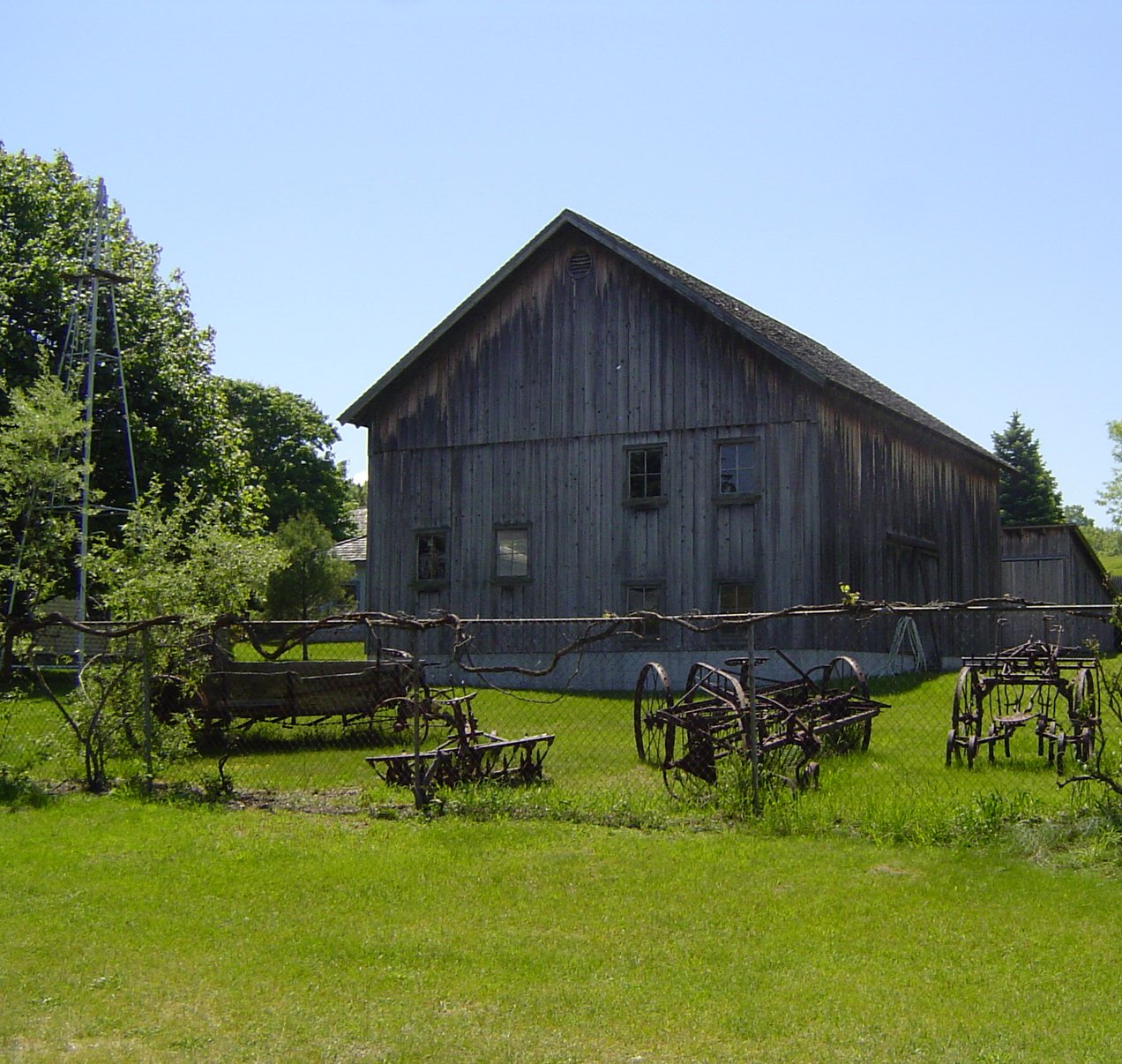
- Farm equipment

- Location within Michigan Location within the United States
- Interactive map
- Location: Roughly bounded by Lake Michigan, Shell Lake, Bass Lake, and Tucker Lake, Cleveland and Glen Arbor Townships
- Coordinates: 44°56′14″N 85°56′11″W
- Area: 3,400 acres (1,400 ha)
- Built: 1880
- Architectural style: Upright and Wing house with Greek Revival elements, gable roofed barn
- NRHP reference No.: 97000563
- Added to NRHP: June 27, 1997

The Port Oneida Rural Historic District is a historic district located along M-22 between Glen Arbor and Lake Leelanau in Leelanau County, Michigan. It was listed on the National Register of Historic Places in 2017.

== History ==
The first European residents of Port Oneida, Carsten and Elizabeth Burfiend, arrived in the area in 1852. By 1860, the population had grown to 87 people, many of whom had emigrated from Hanover and Prussia. In 1861, Thomas Kelderhouse arrived and made an agreement with Carsten Burfiend to construct a dock in exchange for the land to build it on. The dock was completed the next year, and logging began in the area. Kelderhouse also constructed a sawmill, and in the next 25 years the settlement grew, adding a blacksmith shop, a boarding house/hotel, and a general store/post office.

However, by the 1890s the forests had been depleted, and the residents of Port Oneida turned to agriculture to support them. By 1908, the dock and surrounding buildings had been abandoned, and the social center of Port Oneida shifted inland to the site of the Port Oneida School and the Evangelical Lutheran church. Residents of the area continued farming until World War II; after this many shifted to non-farm jobs for income. With the establishment of Sleeping Bear Dunes National Lakeshore in 1970, the National Park Service began acquiring much of the land and buildings in Port Oneida.

== Description ==
Port Oneida Rural Historic District contains approximately 3,400 acres (1,400 ha) along Lake Michigan, within Sleeping Bear Dunes National Lakeshore. The historic district has roughly 150 buildings, most of which are gathered in separate farmsteads throughout the district. Also included are the remnant of agricultural land-use: fields, orchards, fences, and woodlots.

The district also includes the one-room North Unity Schoolhouse, dating from the 1850s, and the 1860 Port Oneida Schoolhouse. Nearby are the Port Oneida cemetery and the former location of the Evangelical Lutheran Church and the Kelderhouse sawmill. The remains of the dock are still in the water.

== Gallery ==
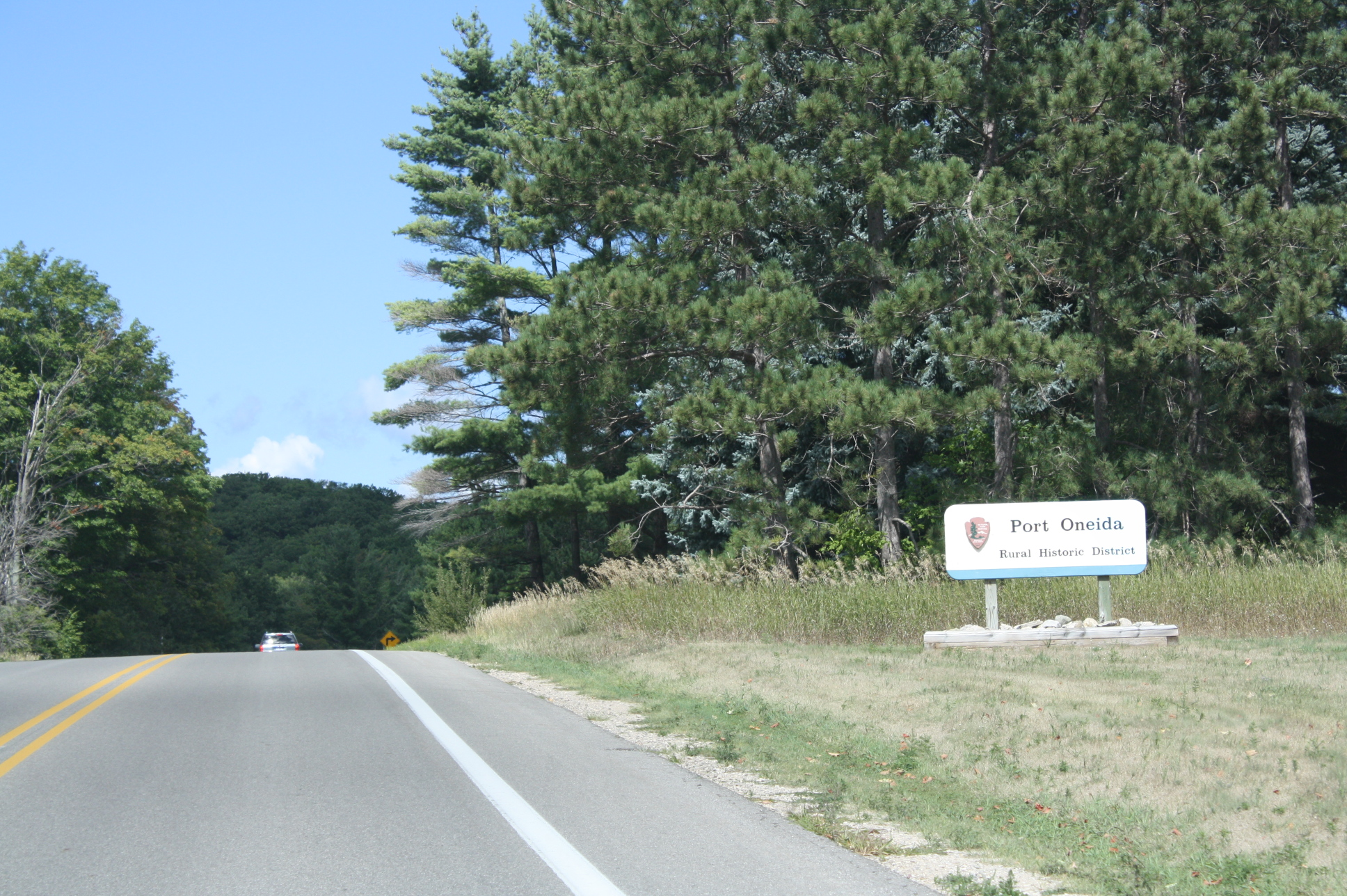
Sign

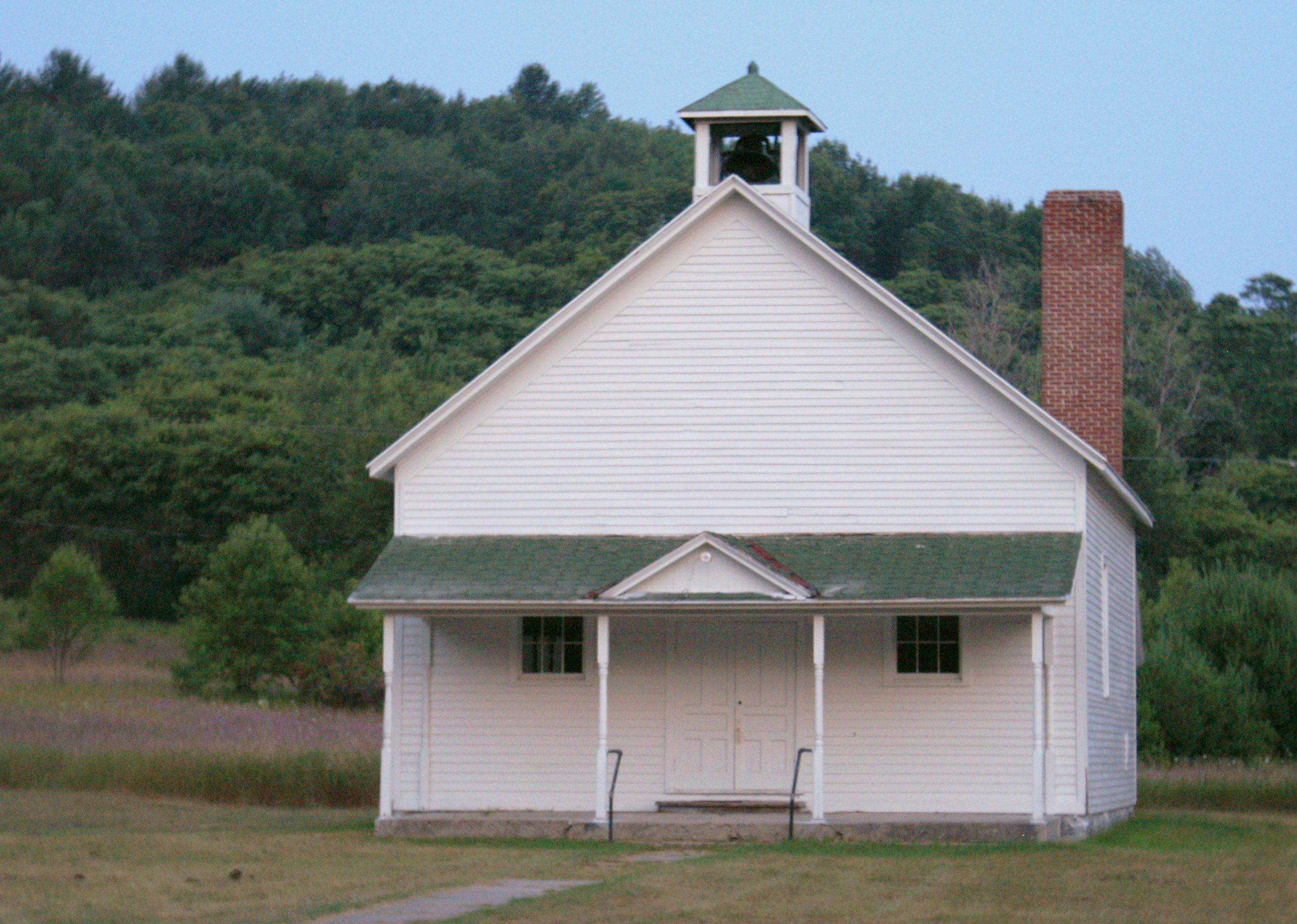
Port Oneida School

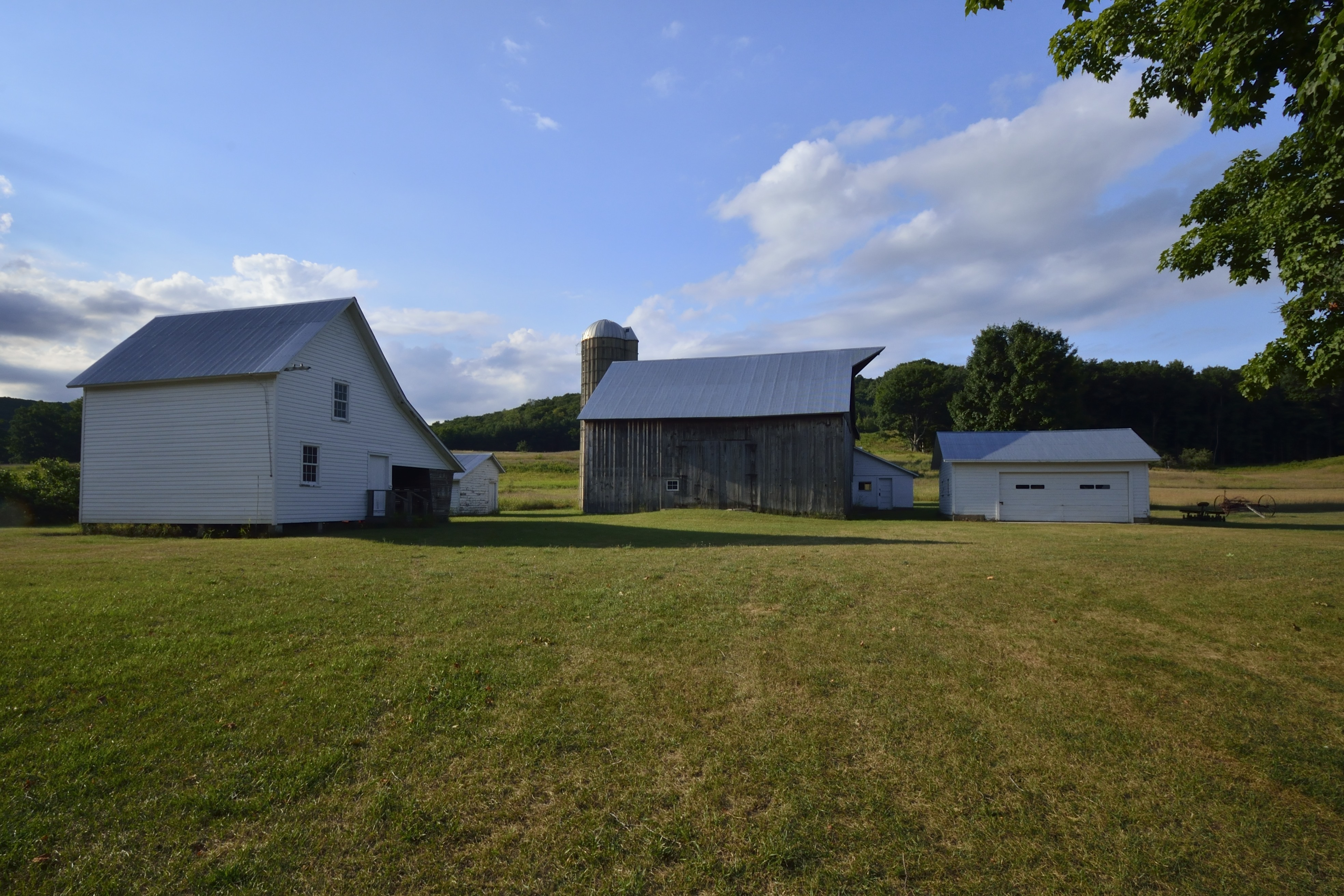
Barn
