= Northport, Michigan =

- Village
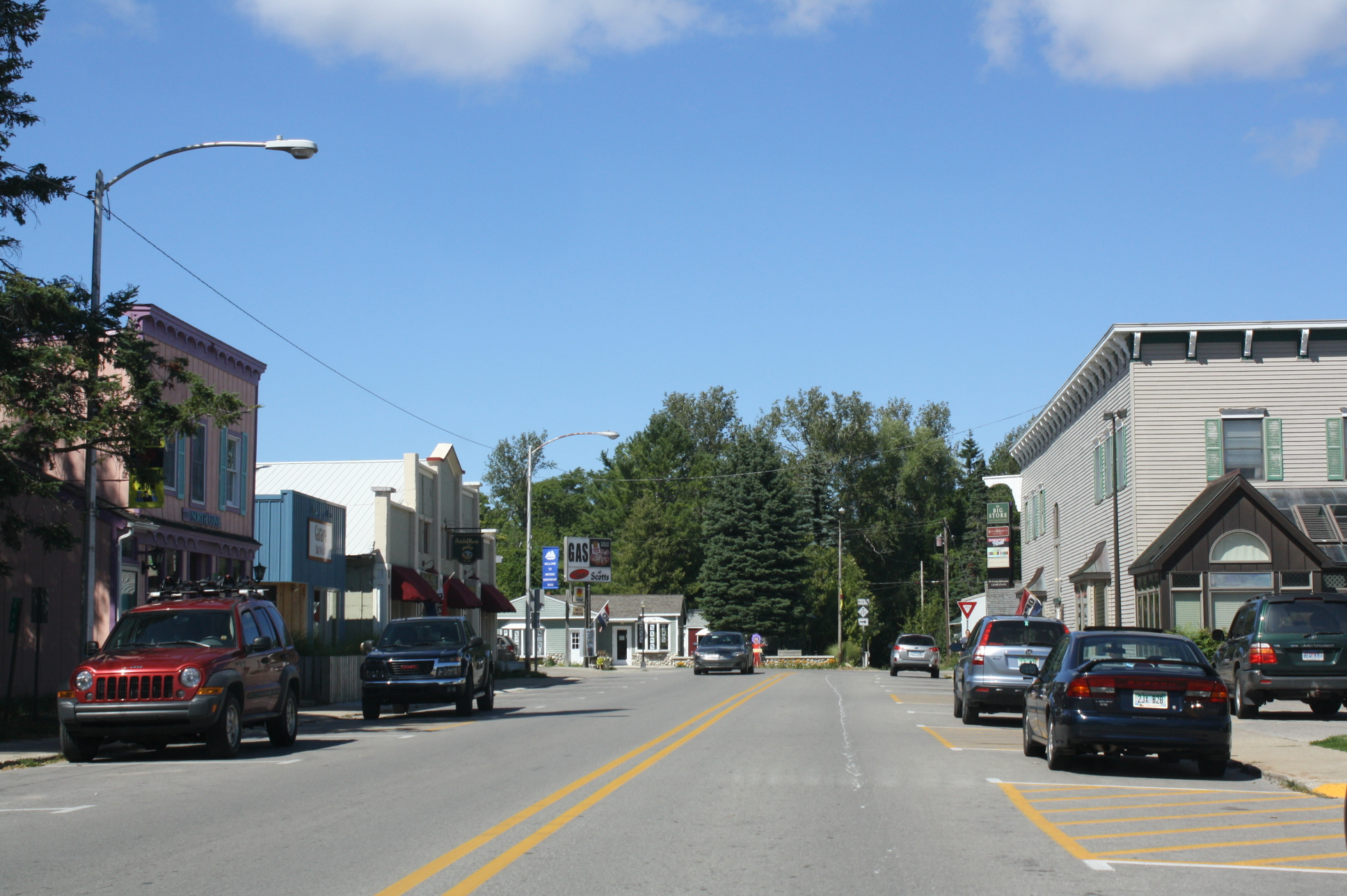
- Downtown Northport, along M-201

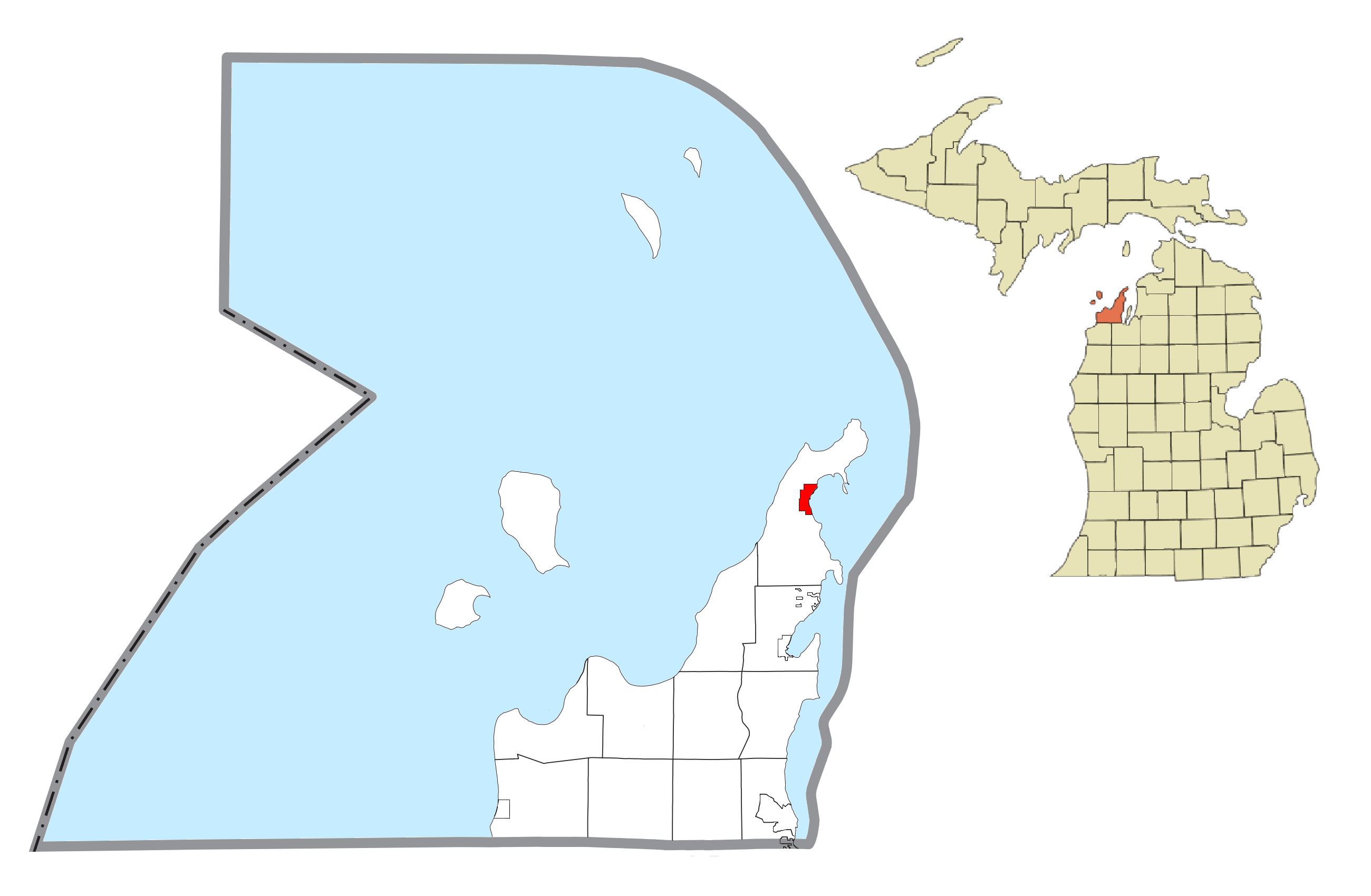
- Location within Leelanau County

- Location within the state of Michigan
- Coordinates: 45°07′51″N 85°37′00″W
- Country: United States
- State: Michigan
- County: Leelanau
- Township: Leelanau

Area
  - Total: 1.65 sq mi (4.28 km^{2})
  - Land: 1.65 sq mi (4.27 km^{2})
  - Water: 0.0039 sq mi (0.01 km^{2})
- Elevation: 607 ft (185 m)

Population (2020)
  - Total: 496
  - Density: 301.1/sq mi (116.24/km^{2})
- Time zone: UTC-5 (Eastern (EST))
  - Summer (DST): UTC-4 (EDT)
- ZIP code(s): 49670
- Area code: 231
- FIPS code: 26-58740
- GNIS feature ID: 0633697
- Website: villageofnorthport.net

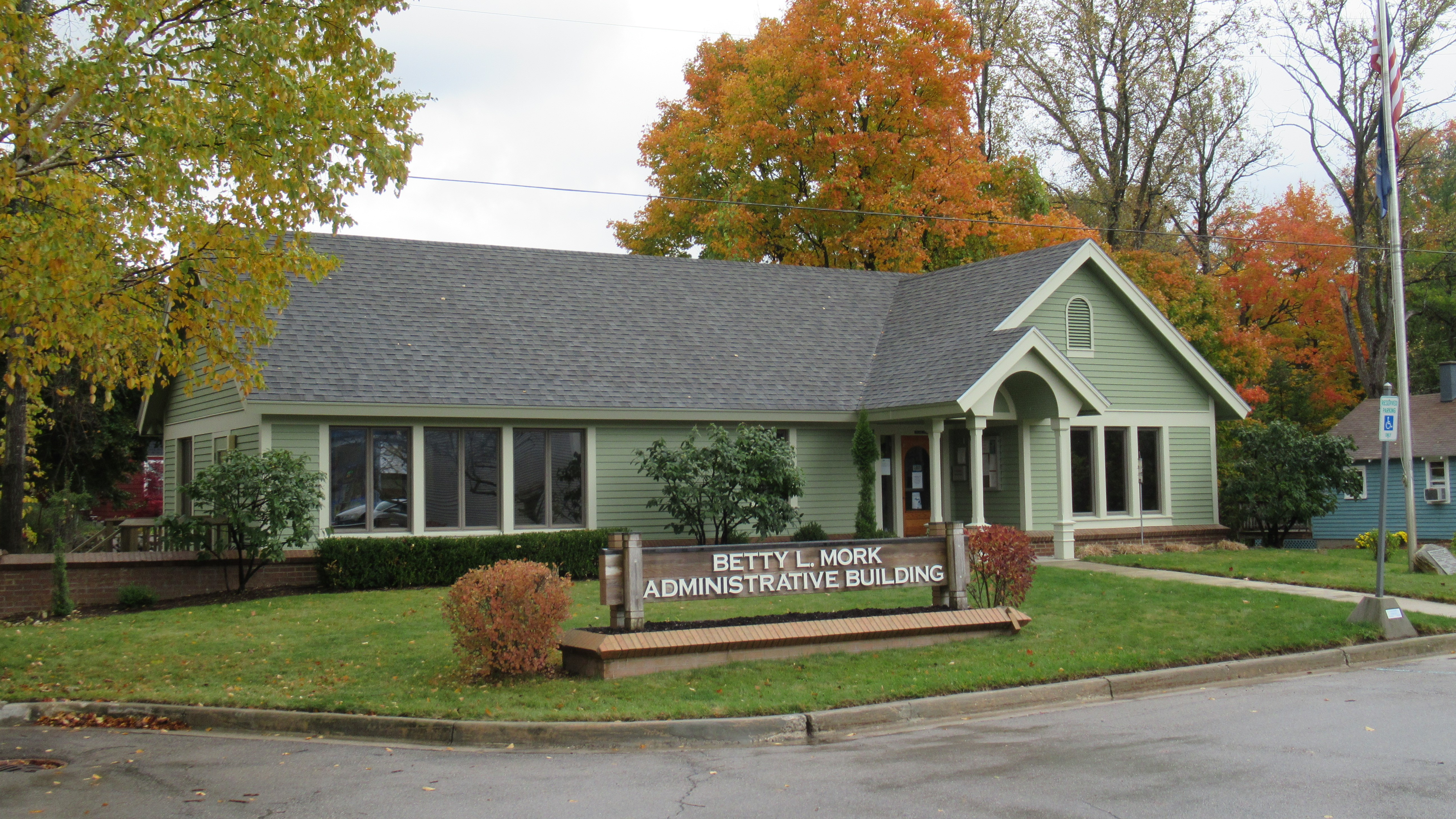
Betty L. Mork Administrative Building

Northport is a village in Leelanau County in the U.S. state of Michigan. Located near the northern tip of the Leelanau Peninsula, Northport is located within Leelanau Township, and lies on the shore of Grand Traverse Bay, a bay of Lake Michigan. Northport had a population of 496 at the 2020 census. The village is located about 29 miles (47 km) north of Traverse City, and is part of that city's metropolitan area. From 1863 to 1883, Northport served as the county seat of Leelanau County.

== History ==
In 1848 Michigan suffered from a smallpox epidemic that affected the entire community of people. Chief Peter Waukazoo and Reverend George Smith moved the community as well as the Holland-area Ottawa Mission up to the Leelanau Peninsula on boats or canoes. When the settlers had reached their destination they called it Waukazooville. Deacon Joseph Dame arrived at Waukazooville in 1854 and decided to change the name to Northport at this time.

Northport was the largest town in Leelanau County for quite a while in the late 1800s and early 1900s. Several general stores were built in the town in 1859 which sold items such as cloth, thread, needles, foods, axes, and more. There was no doctor in town at this time so Reverend Smith was called on to deliver babies and help the ill.

Many people that ended up living in Northport came from New York or Canada. The fishermen, farmers, and other community members would gather on the bay and cut chunks of ice for fisheries, hotels, or even private homes.

The cherry industry that is prevalent in Northport today had just begun in 1853 on Reverend Smith's farm. Farmers began producing cherries so much within those first few years that cherries were being shipped to nearby cities for their markets. The cherry industry in Northport and Leelanau County remains one of the largest in the world.

== Geography ==
According to the United States Census Bureau, the village has a total area of 1.65 square miles (4.27 km^{2}), all land.

=== Major highways ===
- M-22 reaches the northernmost point along its route in Northport, with the highway's two legs meeting at a junction south of the central business district. Southwest of Northport, M-22 travels along the Lake Michigan shore through the communities of Leland, Glen Arbor, Empire, Frankfort, Elberta, Arcadia, and Onekama, before terminating at US-31 north of Manistee. South of Northport, M-22 travels along the western shore of Grand Traverse Bay through the communities of Omena, Suttons Bay, and Greilickville, before terminating at an intersection in Traverse City.
- M-201 is a short north–south highway solely serving travelers through the village of Northport. North of the village, the highway transitions to Leelanau County Road 640, which can be used to access Leelanau State Park and the Grand Traverse Lighthouse.

== Climate ==
This climatic region has large seasonal temperature differences, with warm to hot (and often humid) summers and cold (sometimes severely cold) winters. According to the Köppen Climate Classification system, Northport has a humid continental climate, abbreviated "Dfb" on climate maps.

Climate data for Northport, Michigan
| Month | Jan | Feb | Mar | Apr | May | Jun | Jul | Aug | Sep | Oct | Nov | Dec | Year |
|---|---|---|---|---|---|---|---|---|---|---|---|---|---|
| Mean daily maximum °C (°F) | −2.0 (28.4) | −1.1 (30.1) | 3.4 (38.2) | 10.3 (50.6) | 16.1 (60.9) | 21.3 (70.4) | 24.0 (75.2) | 23.8 (74.8) | 20 (68) | 13 (56) | 6.5 (43.7) | 0.4 (32.8) | 11.4 (52.5) |
| Mean daily minimum °C (°F) | −8 (17) | −9 (16) | −5.7 (21.8) | 0.3 (32.5) | 5.4 (41.7) | 11.0 (51.8) | 14.8 (58.6) | 14.6 (58.3) | 11.1 (51.9) | 5.2 (41.3) | −0.5 (31.1) | −5.2 (22.6) | 2.9 (37.2) |
| Average precipitation mm (inches) | 56 (2.2) | 36 (1.4) | 48 (1.9) | 69 (2.7) | 66 (2.6) | 74 (2.9) | 74 (2.9) | 81 (3.2) | 97 (3.8) | 91 (3.6) | 71 (2.8) | 58 (2.3) | 820 (32.3) |
Source: Weatherbase

== Demographics ==
Historical population
| Census | Pop. | Note | %± |
|---|---|---|---|
| 1860 | 393 | | — |
| 1870 | 238 | | −39.4% |
| 1880 | 198 | | −16.8% |
| 1890 | 304 | | 53.5% |
| 1910 | 524 | | — |
| 1920 | 507 | | −3.2% |
| 1930 | 577 | | 13.8% |
| 1940 | 606 | | 5.0% |
| 1950 | 582 | | −4.0% |
| 1960 | 530 | | −8.9% |
| 1970 | 594 | | 12.1% |
| 1980 | 611 | | 2.9% |
| 1990 | 605 | | −1.0% |
| 2000 | 648 | | 7.1% |
| 2010 | 526 | | −18.8% |
| 2020 | 496 | | −5.7% |
U.S. Decennial Census

=== 2010 census ===
As of the census of 2010, there were 526 people, 251 households, and 147 families residing in the village. The population density was 318.8 inhabitants per square mile (123.1/km^{2}). There were 405 housing units at an average density of 245.5 per square mile (94.8/km^{2}). The racial makeup of the village was 93.2% White, 0.6% African American, 2.5% Native American, 0.2% Asian, 0.4% from other races, and 3.2% from two or more races. Hispanic or Latino of any race were 6.1% of the population.

There were 251 households, of which 15.9% had children under the age of 18 living with them, 48.2% were married couples living together, 8.0% had a female householder with no husband present, 2.4% had a male householder with no wife present, and 41.4% were non-families. 37.5% of all households were made up of individuals, and 19.9% had someone living alone who was 65 years of age or older. The average household size was 2.10 and the average family size was 2.63.

The median age in the village was 57.5 years. 14.4% of residents were under the age of 18; 6.6% were between the ages of 18 and 24; 13.5% were from 25 to 44; 29.4% were from 45 to 64; and 36.1% were 65 years of age or older. The gender makeup of the village was 46.4% male and 53.6% female.

=== 2000 census ===
As of the census of 2000, there were 648 people, 272 households, and 174 families residing in the village. The population density was 389.7 inhabitants per square mile (150.5/km^{2}). There were 391 housing units at an average density of 235.1 per square mile (90.8/km^{2}). The racial makeup of the village was 96.14% White, 0.31% African American, 2.16% Native American, 0.31% Asian, 0.31% from other races, and 0.77% from two or more races. Hispanic or Latino of any race were 3.55% of the population.

There were 272 households, out of which 21.7% had children under the age of 18 living with them, 52.2% were married couples living together, 9.2% had a female householder with no husband present, and 35.7% were non-families. 32.4% of all households were made up of individuals, and 15.1% had someone living alone who was 65 years of age or older. The average household size was 2.18 and the average family size was 2.69.

In the village, the population was spread out, with 18.4% under the age of 18, 4.2% from 18 to 24, 17.4% from 25 to 44, 28.7% from 45 to 64, and 31.3% who were 65 years of age or older. The median age was 50 years. For every 100 females, there were 86.7 males. For every 100 females age 18 and over, there were 83.0 males.

The median income for a household in the village was $40,368, and the median income for a family was $48,750. Males had a median income of $31,042 versus $26,786 for females. The per capita income for the village was $23,786. Roughly 6.7% of families and 9.1% of the population were below the poverty line, including 15.0% of those under age 18 and 3.9% of those age 65 or over.

== Local attractions ==
Events

- Winter Carnival is held in February at Braman Hill Park. Activities include sledding and tubing, ice skating, Cardboard Box Sled Race, Broomball Tournament, and Chili Cook off.
- The Scott Brow Fishing Derby is an annual event held every spring at the Old Mill Pond. The Northport Sportsman's Club stocks the water as well as sponsors the event. Prizes are awarded to the child with the largest fish.
- The Fly In Breakfast at Woolsey Airport just north of Northport attracts small, unique aircraft to the small airfield. In addition to the planes, antique, custom, and sports cars are also on display. Breakfast is served in the morning and the community band provides entertainment.
- The "Cars in the Park" car show is held annually at Haserot Park near downtown Northport. Viewers can look at classic cars while listening to music selected by a DJ. Trophies are given to the top twenty five vehicles.
- The Miles For Mammograms, also known as The Alice Busby Memorial Walk, is held in early September. The memorial walk is a 2-mile walk or a 4.5 mile walk beginning and ending in downtown Northport. Miles For Mammograms helps community members, that suffer from a low income, to get free health services.

Places

- The Grand Traverse Lighthouse, 9 miles (14 km) north of town, is a historic building built in 1858. It is now a tourist attraction that sits within Leelanau State Park. Events such as the Haunted Lighthouse are held annually.
- Leelanau State Park is located on the tip of Michigan's "little finger". It is home to nearly 1,300 acres that includes the Grand Traverse Lighthouse museum, a rustic campground, two mini cabins, 8.5 miles of hiking/skiing trail, and shoreline where petoskey stones can be found.
- Braman Hill Recreation Center is a year-round facility that is home to tennis courts, basketball courts, a skate park and ice rink, a shooting range, a sledding hill, hiking trails, and warming hut with bathrooms. At the top of the hill is a fire ring and scenic view.
- Woolsey Airport is a General Aviation airfield north of the town. It has 2 runways and is a popular field for those who fly their own plane to the upper parts of the peninsula. There is a yearly Fly-in, Drive-in hosted by the Northport Lions Club, with a pancake breakfast and old car exhibit.

== Education ==
- Northport Public School serves most of northern Leelanau County.

== Notable residents ==
- Tim Allen, actor and comedian
- Mario Batali, chef
- Gilman M. Dame, politician
- Frederick W. Galbraith
- Jonathan Kuck, speed skater
- Nathan Scherrer, music video producer
- Mark Spitznagel, investor and hedge-fund manager
- Clinton F. Woolsey, aviator

== Gallery ==
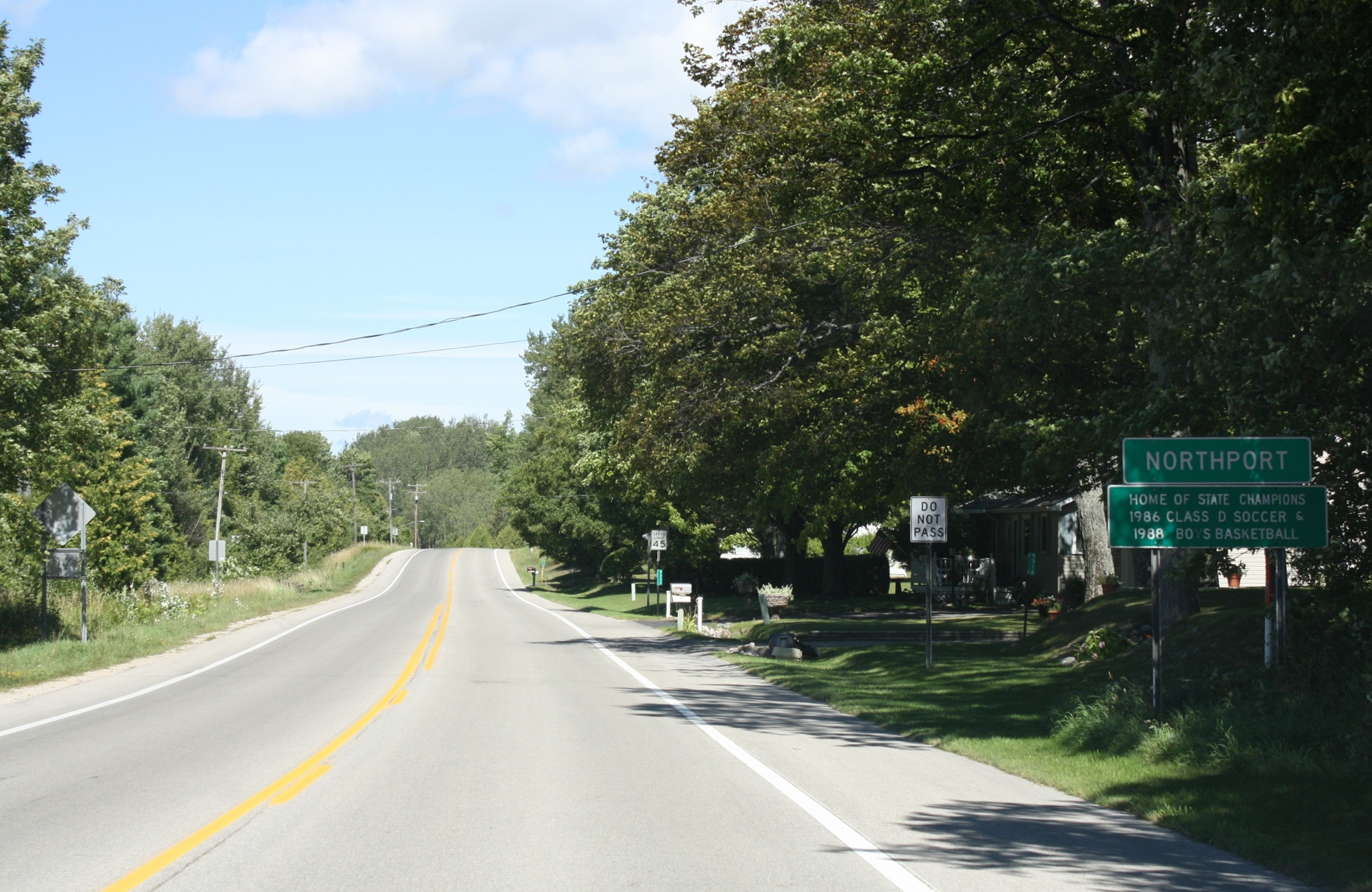
A sign for Northport along M-22

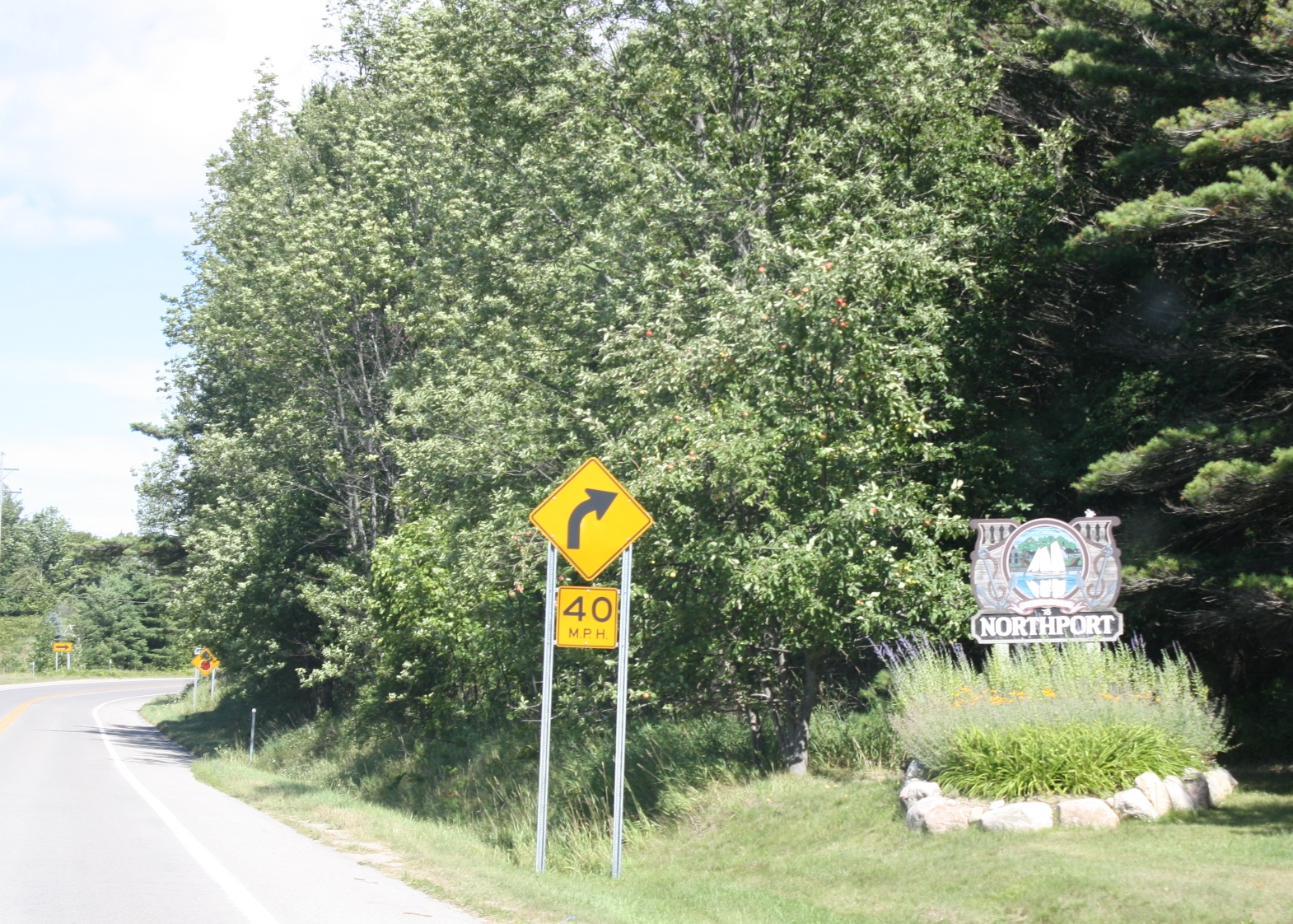
Welcome sign

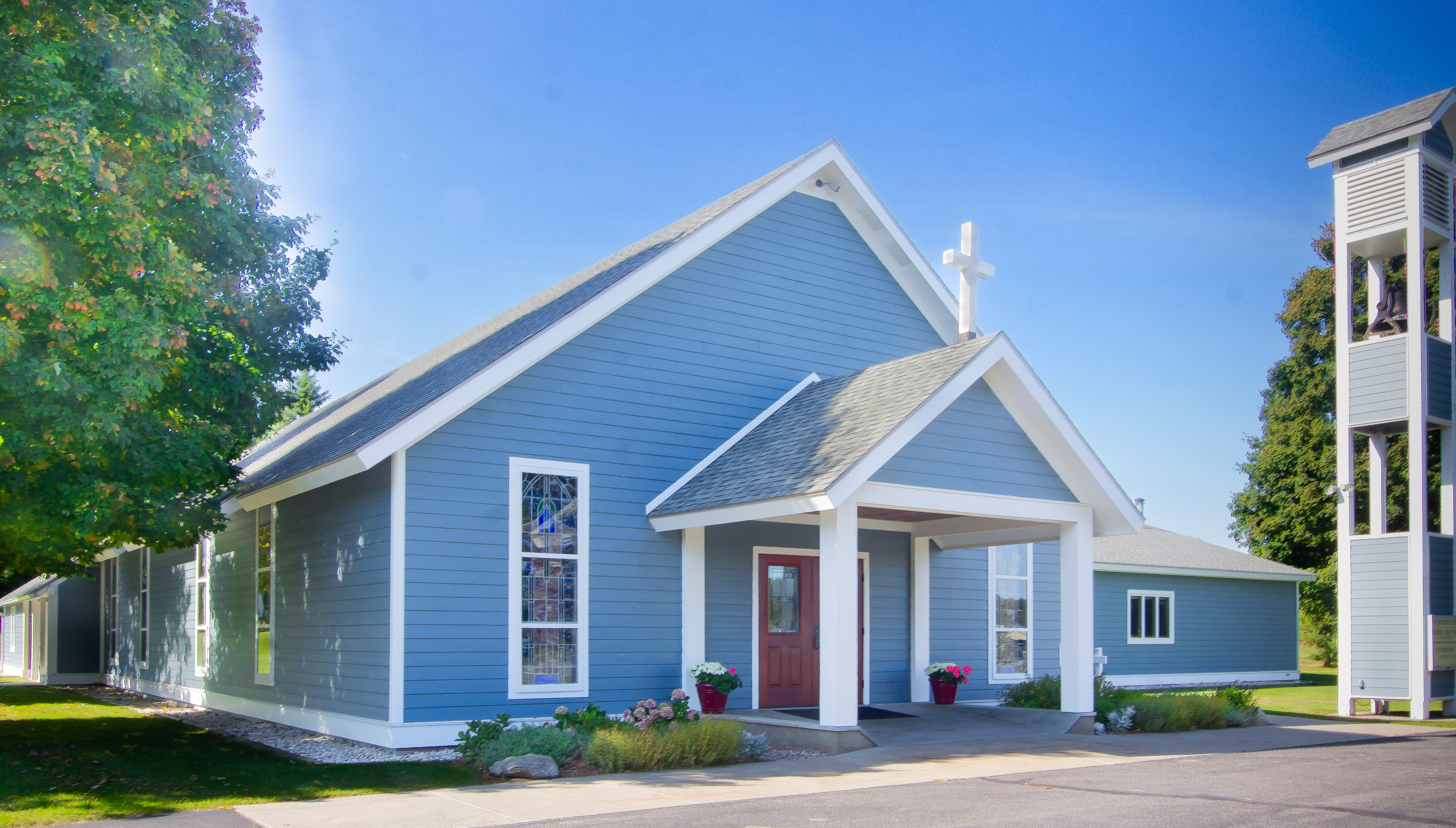
St. Gertrude the Great Catholic Church

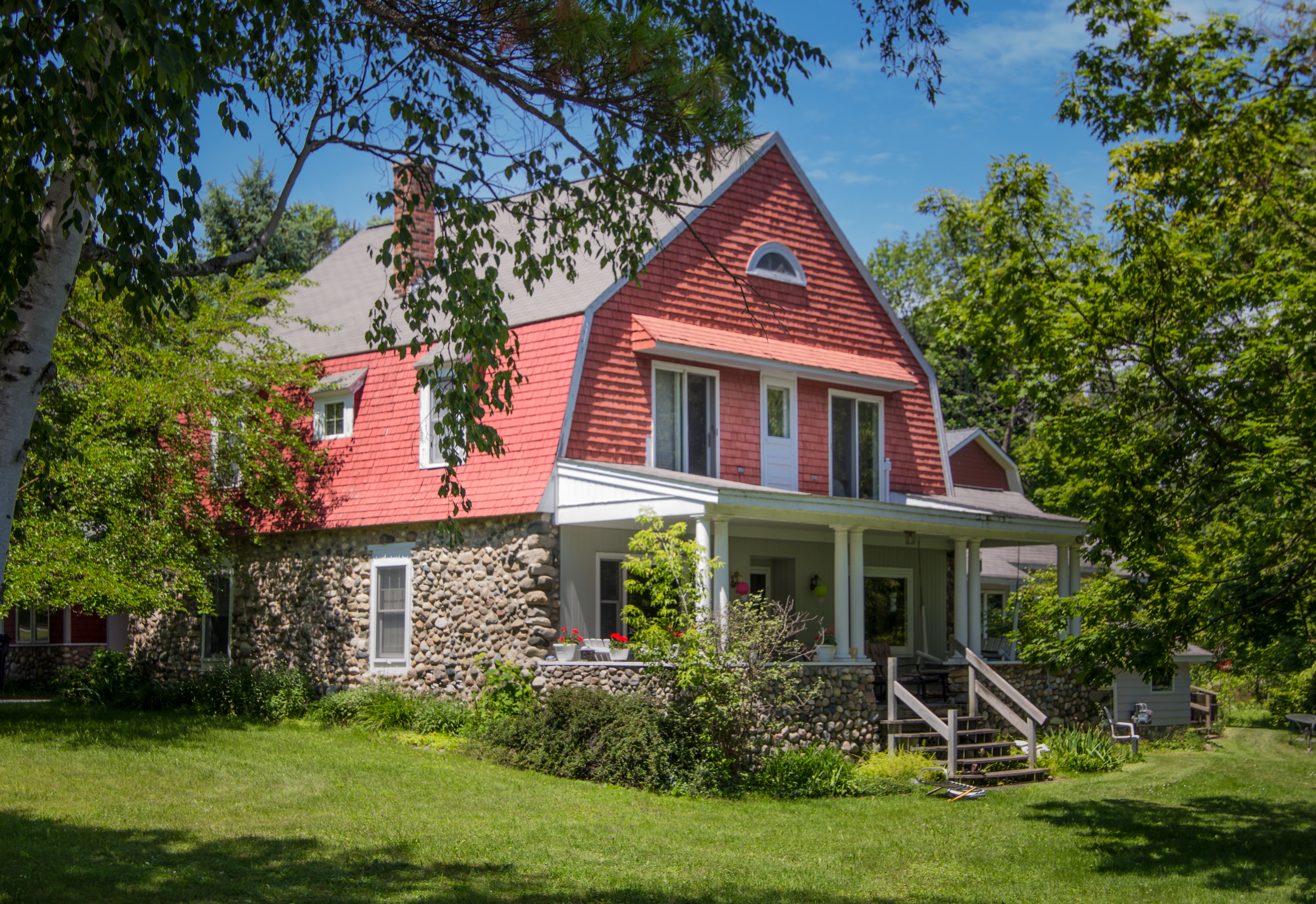
Charlotte Bushnell House

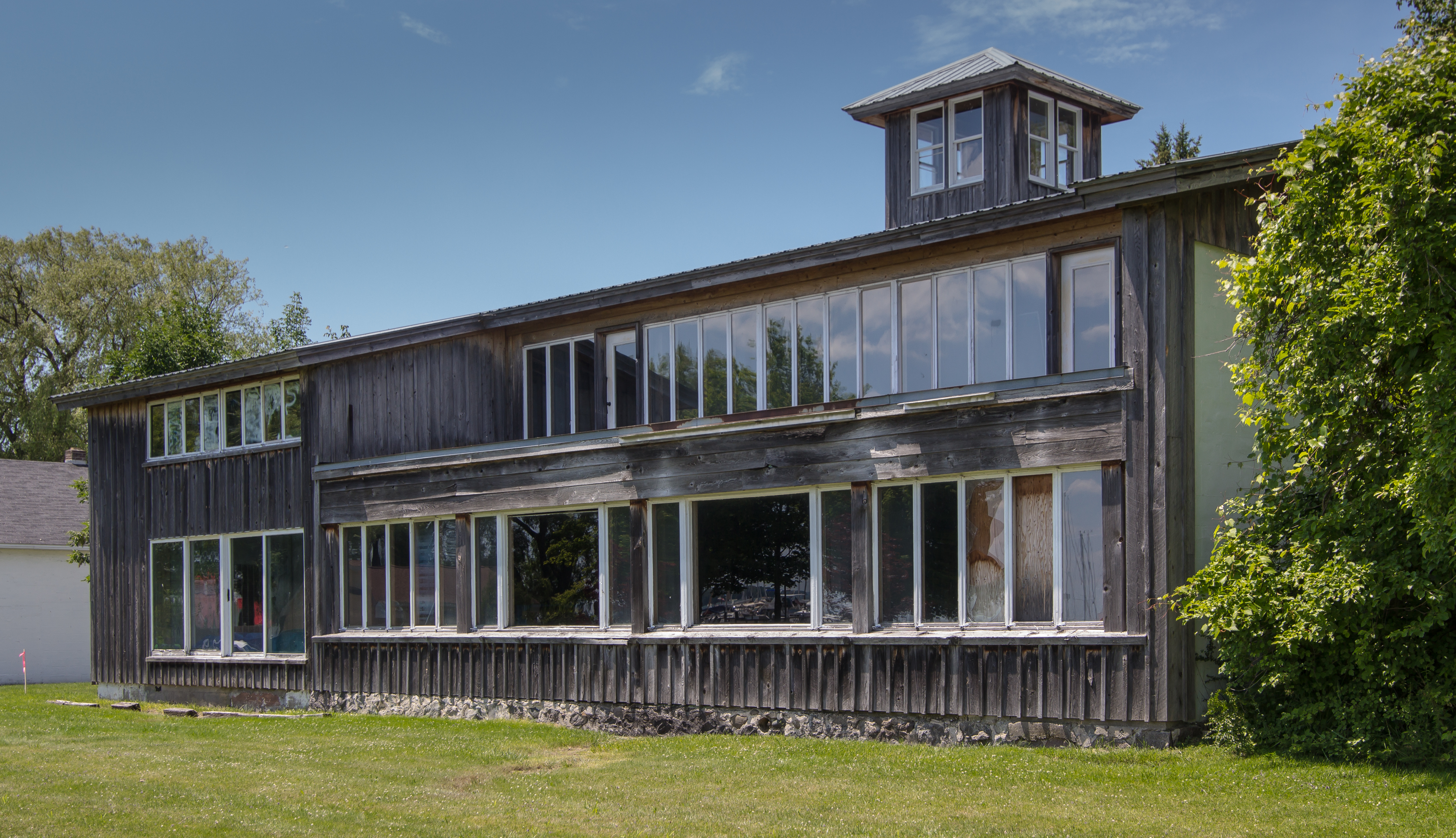
Howard E. Gill Building

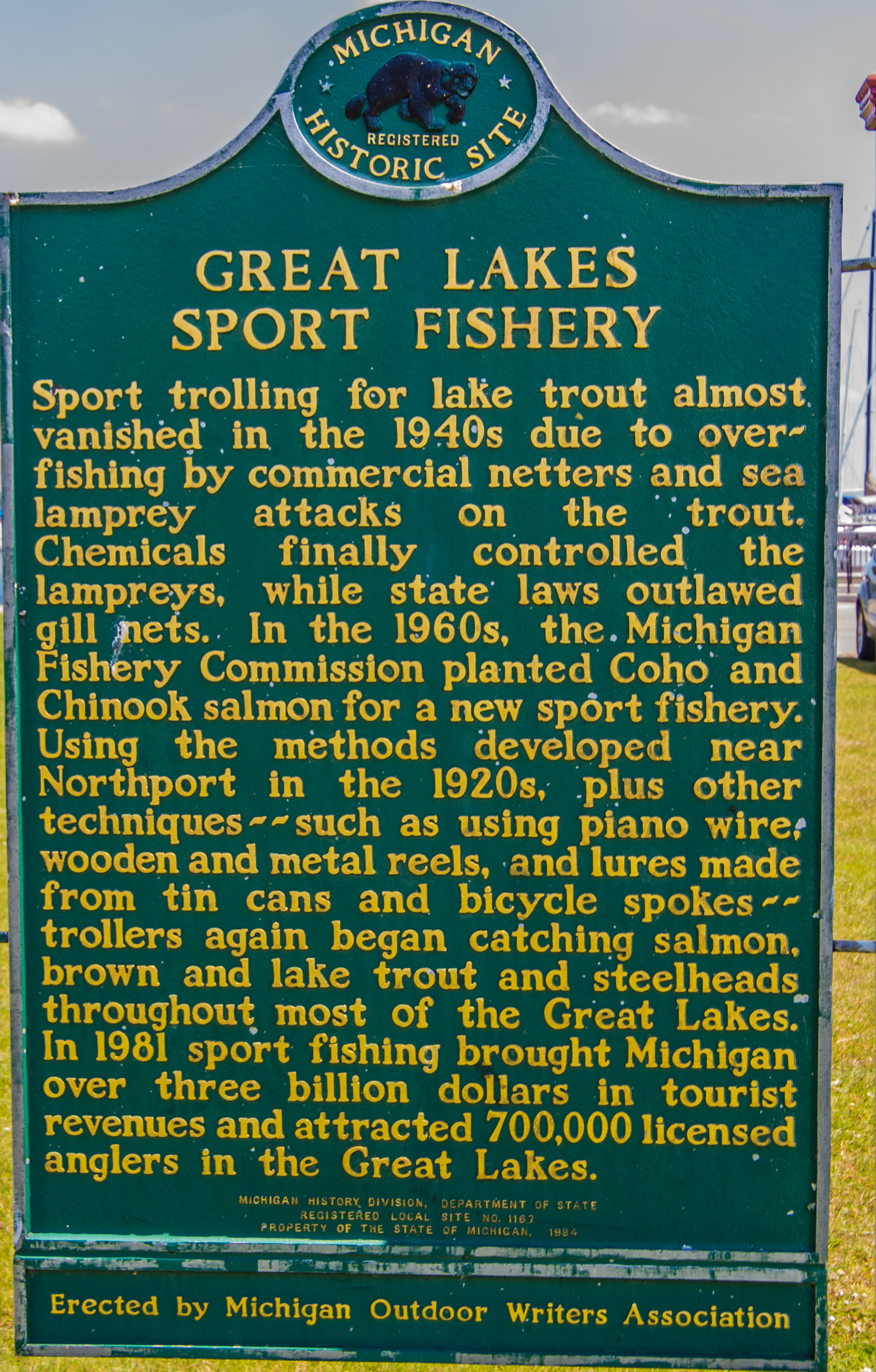
Great Lakes Sport Fishery Historical Designation
