= Leelanau Peninsula =

Geological formation

Coordinates: 45.05°N 85.655°W

Leelanau Peninsula and surrounding areas

The Leelanau Peninsula (/ˈliːlənɔː/ LEE-lə-naw) is a peninsula of the U.S. state of Michigan that extends about 30 miles (50 km) from the western side of the Lower Peninsula of Michigan into Lake Michigan, forming Grand Traverse Bay. It is often referred to as the "little finger" of the mitten-shaped lower peninsula. The peninsula is a tourist hotspot, especially due to the popularity of Sleeping Bear Dunes National Lakeshore, which adorns the southwestern coast of the peninsula. The peninsula is also largely agricultural, notably for cherries and wine.

Most of the peninsula is politically part of the eponymous Leelanau County, which also administers the nearby Manitou Islands and Fox Islands. The base of the peninsula, at its southern end, is divided between Benzie County and Grand Traverse County. Traverse City, the largest city in Northern Michigan, is located at the southeastern end of the peninsula, at the head of Grand Traverse Bay.

== Geography ==
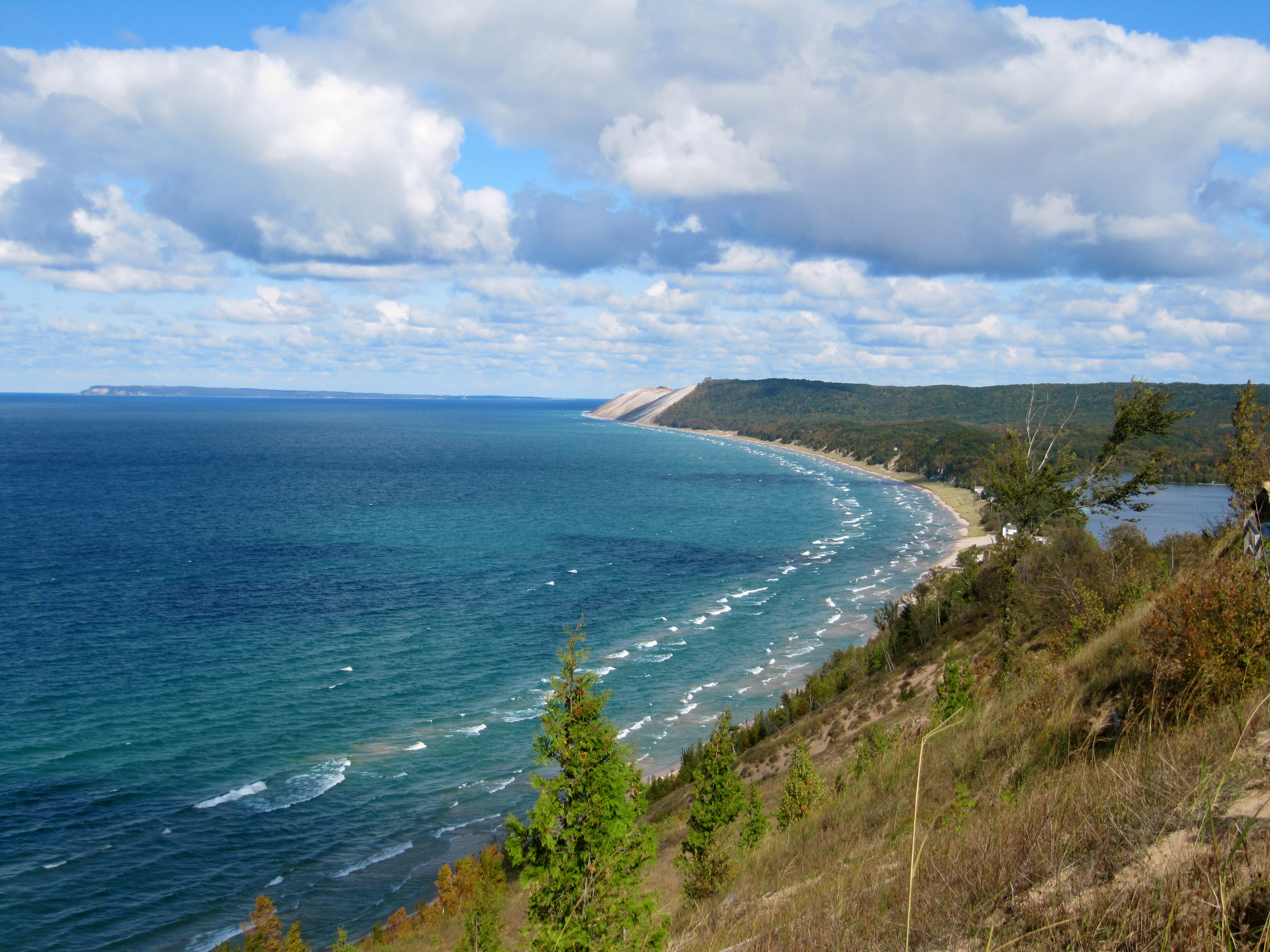
Sleeping Bear Dunes from the Empire Bluff Trail near Empire. Dune ecosystems dominate much of the southwest of the peninsula.

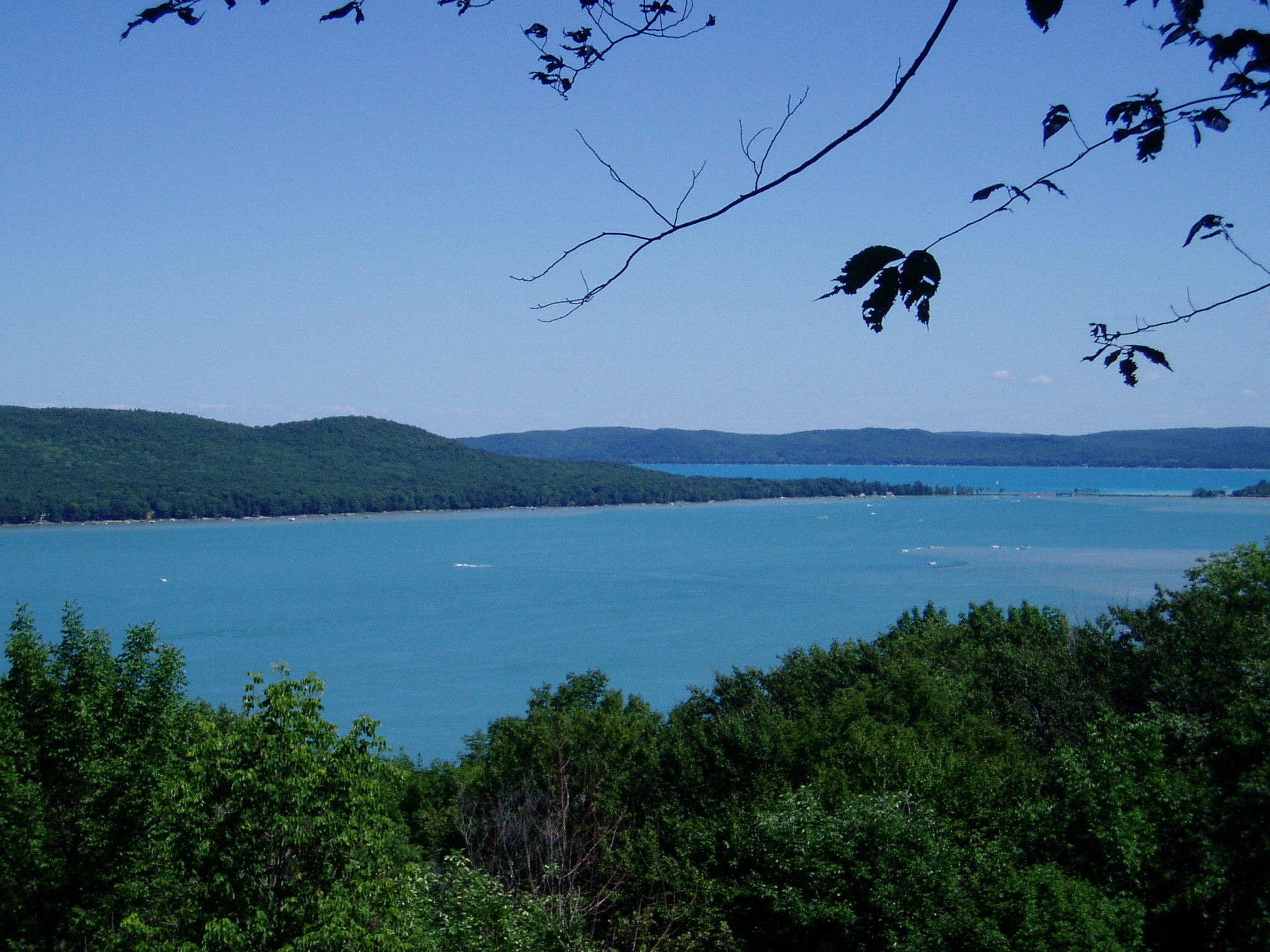
Glen Lake from the Pierce Stocking Scenic Drive

The Leelanau Peninsula is a roughly triangular-shaped peninsula that extends about 30 miles (50 km) off of Michigan's Lower Peninsula into Lake Michigan. The peninsula forms the western shore of the Grand Traverse Bay. At its base, the peninsula is about 20 miles (30 km) wide.

Nearby the peninsula, in Lake Michigan, lie North Manitou and South Manitou islands, as well as the smaller Fox Islands, all of which are under jurisdiction of Leelanau County. In Grand Traverse Bay lie two islands, Bellow Island and Power Island, the latter of which is administered by Grand Traverse County. Traverse City, the largest municipality in Northern Michigan, is located at the base of the peninsula on the east side, at the head of Grand Traverse Bay.

East of the Leelanau Peninsula is the smaller Old Mission Peninsula. This peninsula, which is part of the neighboring Grand Traverse County, is much thinner than the Leelanau, only about 3.2 miles (5 km) at its widest, and only about half the length, at 17 miles (27 km).

M-22 is a famous highway that runs along the coast of the Leelanau Peninsula, as well as further south down Lake Michigan. M-72 and M-204 are other highways that cross the Leelanau Peninsula west–east; M-72 runs across the base of the peninsula from Empire to Traverse City, while M-204 crosses roughly halfway up the peninsula, from Leland to Suttons Bay via Lake Leelanau. Another highway, US 31 between Beulah and Chums Corner, runs parallel to M-72 and M-204, although it lies a few miles south of the base of the Leelanau Peninsula.

=== Climate and agriculture ===
The entire Leelanau Peninsula lies within a warm-summer humid continental climate, or Dfb under the Köppen climate classification. Also known as a hemiboreal climate, the peninsula is subject to generally warm, mild summers, and severe winters.

The location of the peninsula along the 45th parallel is tempered by the strong and moderating effects of Lake Michigan and Grand Traverse Bay, which allow the peninsula to play host to an agricultural mecca. These conditions allow apple and cherry production to flourish on the peninsula. Additionally the Leelanau Peninsula AVA is known for being one of the best Michigan wine regions and is a designated American Viticultural Area (AVA).

=== Waterways ===
The Leelanau Peninsula is home to a number of lakes and rivers. Lake Leelanau, at nearly 21 miles (34 km) long, separates much of the east of the peninsula from the rest, and forms an isthmus with Grand Traverse Bay. The lake is traversable via the M-204 Lake Leelanau Narrows Bridge in the community of Lake Leelanau. The narrows, within the eponymous community, separate the lake into a North and South basin. Glen Lake, in the southwest of the peninsula, is also separated into two basins, known as "Big" and "Little" Glen Lake. Its narrows are also traversable, via a bridge along M-22. Lake Leelanau and Glen Lake are the 14th and 18th largest lakes in Michigan, respectively. These lakes are drained by the Leland River and Crystal River, respectively.

=== Communities ===
Communities on the Leelanau Peninsula include:

- Cedar
- Empire
- Glen Arbor
- Glen Haven
- Greilickville
- Maple City
- Lake Leelanau
- Leland
- Northport
- Northport Point
- Omena
- Peshawbestown
- Suttons Bay
- Traverse City (part of Slabtown neighborhood)

The Grand Traverse Band of Ottawa & Chippewa Indians are a federally-recognized tribe located on the peninsula around Peshawbestown. Their ancestors were among the Algonquian-speaking tribes that largely occupied this area prior to European colonization.

== History ==
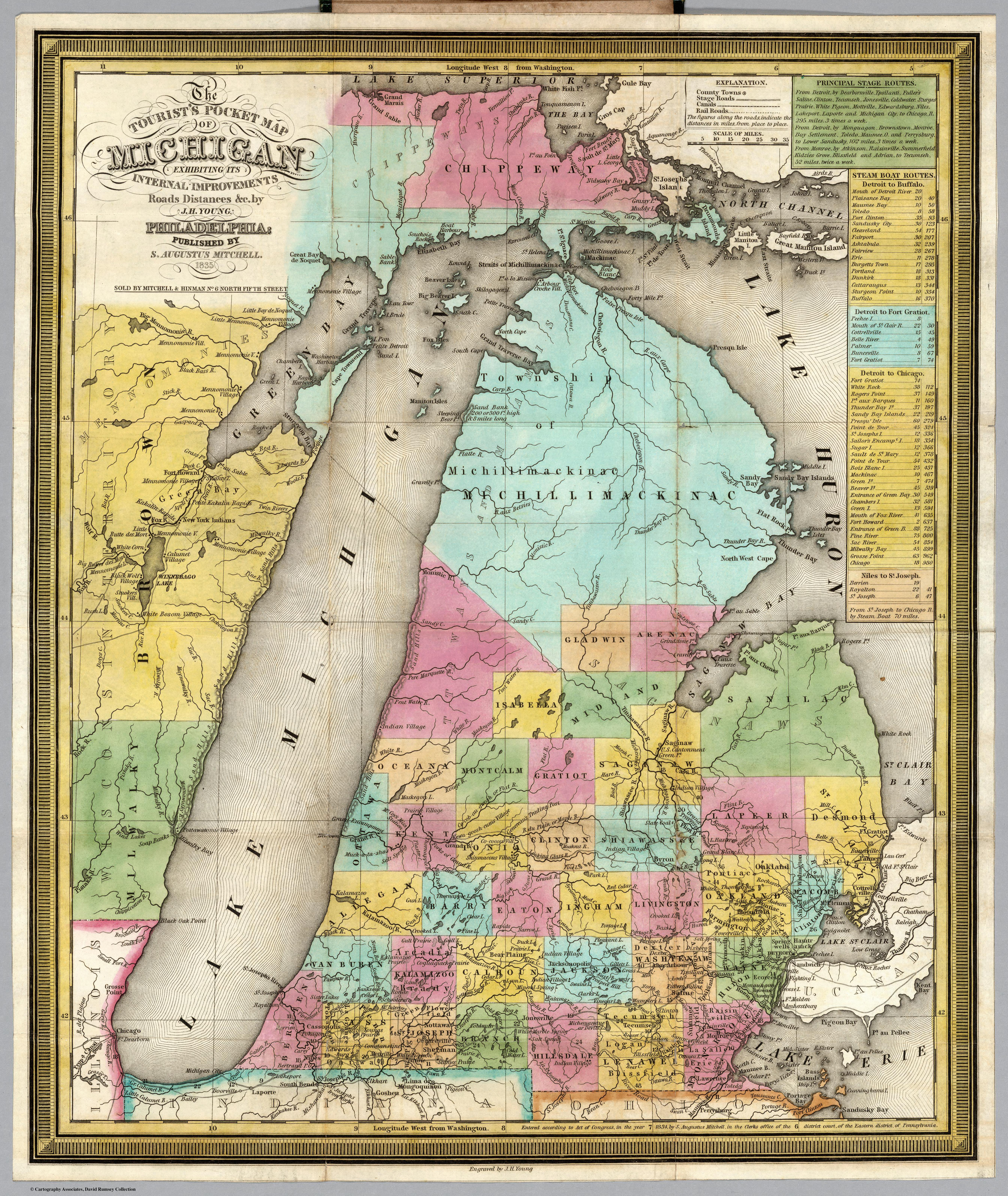
1835 map of Michigan, with the Leelanau Peninsula labelled as "South Cape"

The first peoples of Northern Michigan were the Odawa, Ojibwe, and Potawatomi, collectively known as the Council of Three Fires. The Leelanau Peninsula, as well as much of Northern Michigan and the Upper Peninsula, was ceded from the first peoples to the United States in the 1836 Treaty of Washington. Leelanau County was set off in 1840 and organized in 1863.

The first railroads on the peninsula were built in 1892. Additional railroads would snake up the peninsula with lines from Lake Ann and Traverse City to Provemont, Suttons Bay, and Northport. The last railroad on the peninsula, from Traverse City to Northport via Suttons Bay, was removed in 1996. It was subsequently replaced with the Leelanau Trail, a 17-mile (27 km) recreational rail trail.

The Sleeping Bear Dunes National Lakeshore, the most renowned part of the peninsula, was authorized on October 21, 1970. The park's creation was controversial because it involved the transfer of private property to public ownership. The federal government's stance at the time was that the Great Lakes were the "third coast" and had to be preserved much like Cape Hatteras or Point Reyes, which are National Seashores.

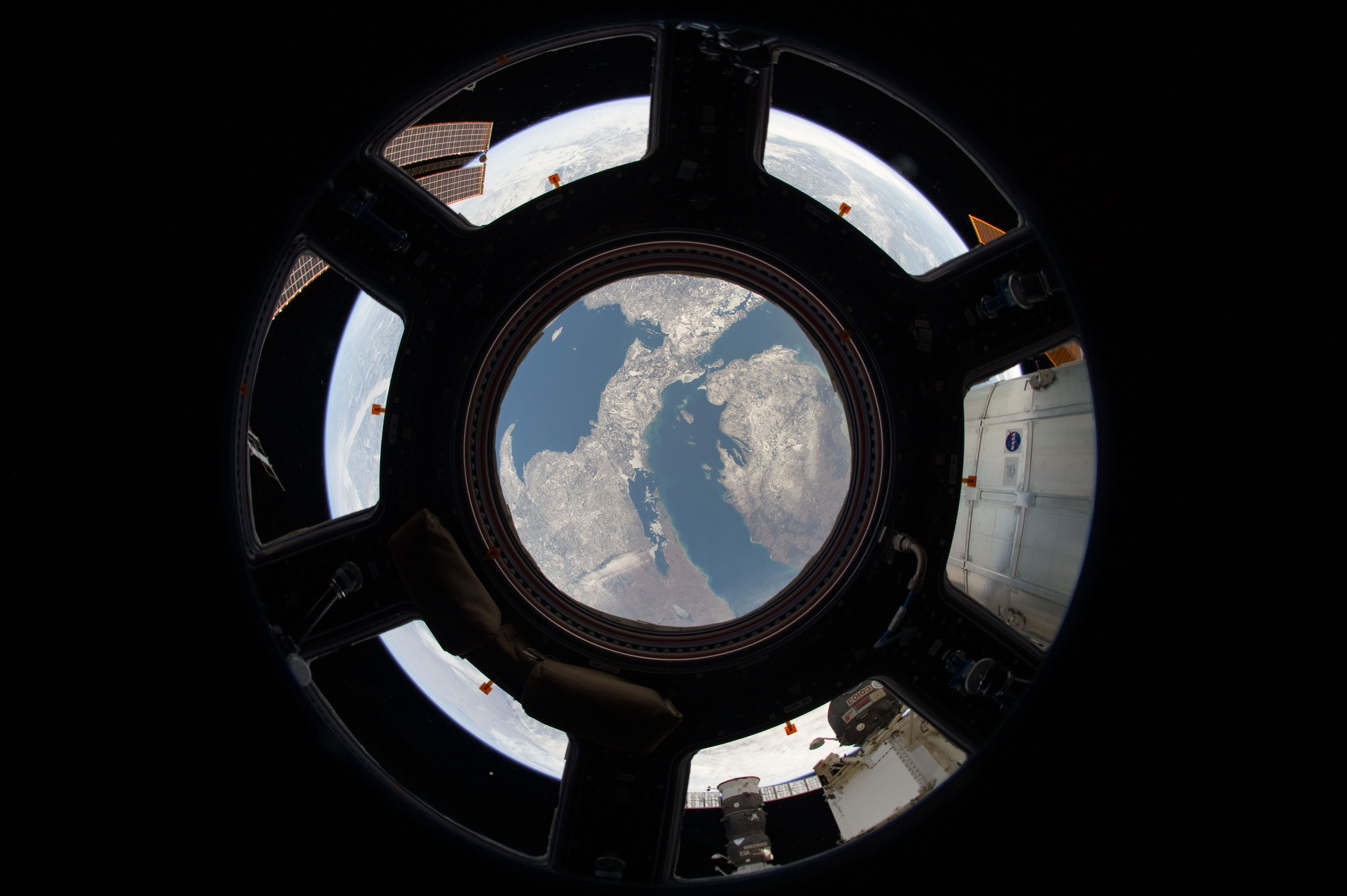
The Leelanau Peninsula is just to the right of the center as seen from the Cupola of the International Space Station. North is oriented towards the upper left; taken on March 11, 2012.

=== Etymology ===
Native Americans who first inhabited the area called this land "ke-ski-bi-ag," which means "narrow body of water."

"Leelanau" was traditionally said to be a Native American word meaning "delight of life," but the name was more likely invented by Henry Rowe Schoolcraft, the United States Indian agent for the territory in the early 19th century, or his wife Jane Johnston Schoolcraft. Henry also used the name Leelinau for a character in his writing. Jane was the daughter of a prominent Scots-Irish Canadian fur trader and an Ojibwe chief's daughter based in Sault Ste. Marie, Ontario and Michigan, and Henry learned about the Ojibwe (or Chippewa) through his wife's and mother-in-law's family. See Leelanau County for a more complete discussion of the etymology of the name.

Scholars have established, however, that Jane first used Leelinau as a pen name for her writings in The Literary Voyager, a family magazine which she and her husband wrote together and circulated among friends in the 1820s. She and her siblings were well-educated and she wrote in Ojibwe and English.

While her writing was not published formally in her lifetime (except as her husband appropriated it under his own name), since the late 20th century Jane Johnston Schoolcraft has been recognized as "the first Native American literary writer, the first known Indian woman writer, the first known Indian poet, the first known poet to write poems in a Native American language, and the first known American Indian to write out traditional Indian stories." In 2008 Jane Johnston Schoolcraft was inducted into the Michigan Women's Hall of Fame.

== Recreation ==
Much of the Leelanau Peninsula is protected as parkland. The southwest of the peninsula is home to Sleeping Bear Dunes National Lakeshore. Within the lakeshore is the Port Oneida Rural Historic District, which preserves a historic ghost town. The northern tip of the peninsula is home to Leelanau State Park and the Grand Traverse Light. Tourists often visit communities such as Glen Arbor, Leland, Northport, and Suttons Bay. Leland is home to Fishtown, a historic commercial fishing area. Leland also is home to ferries that can be used to access the Manitou Islands.

== Images ==
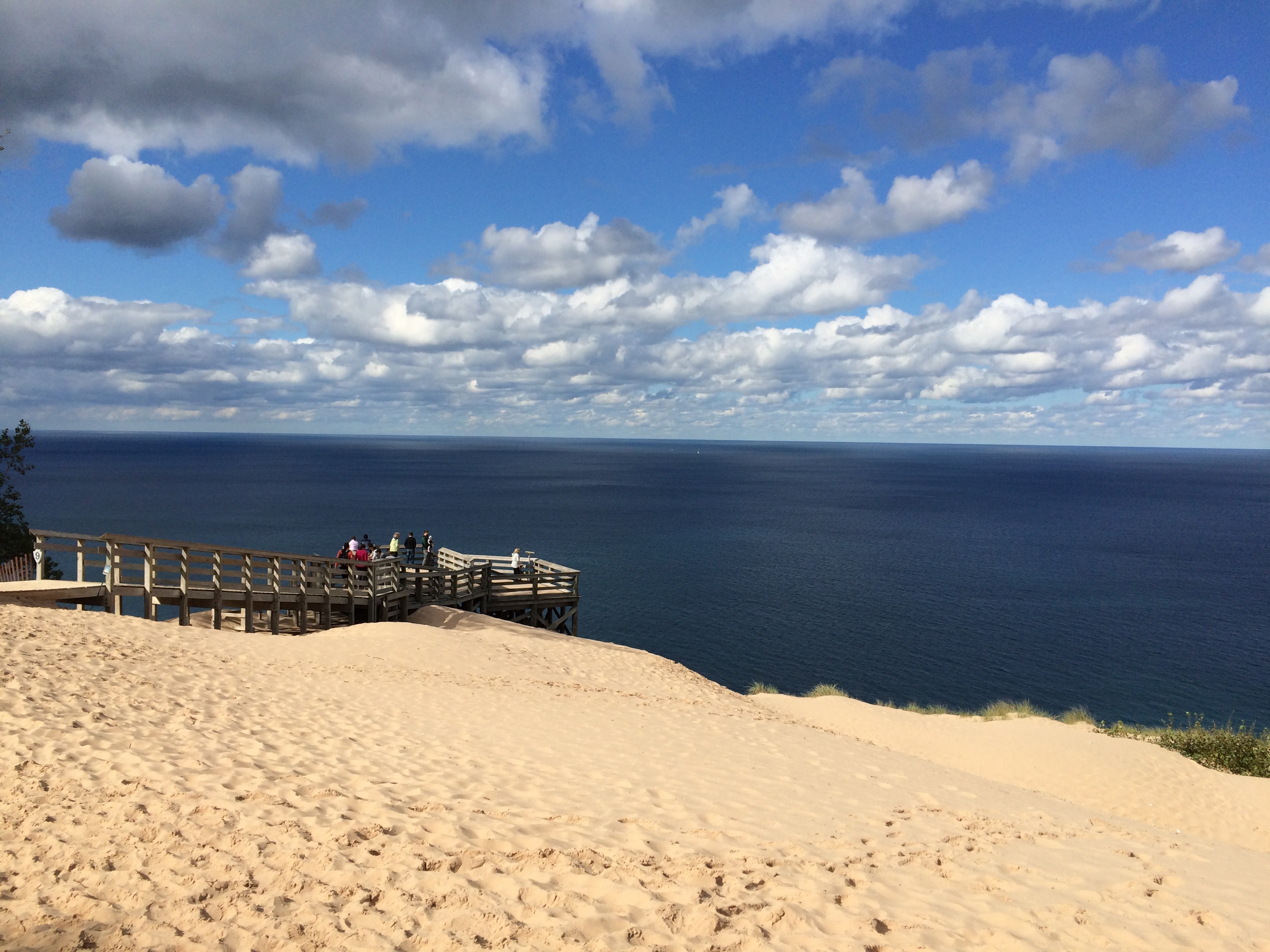
Lake Michigan Overlook at Sleeping Bear Dunes

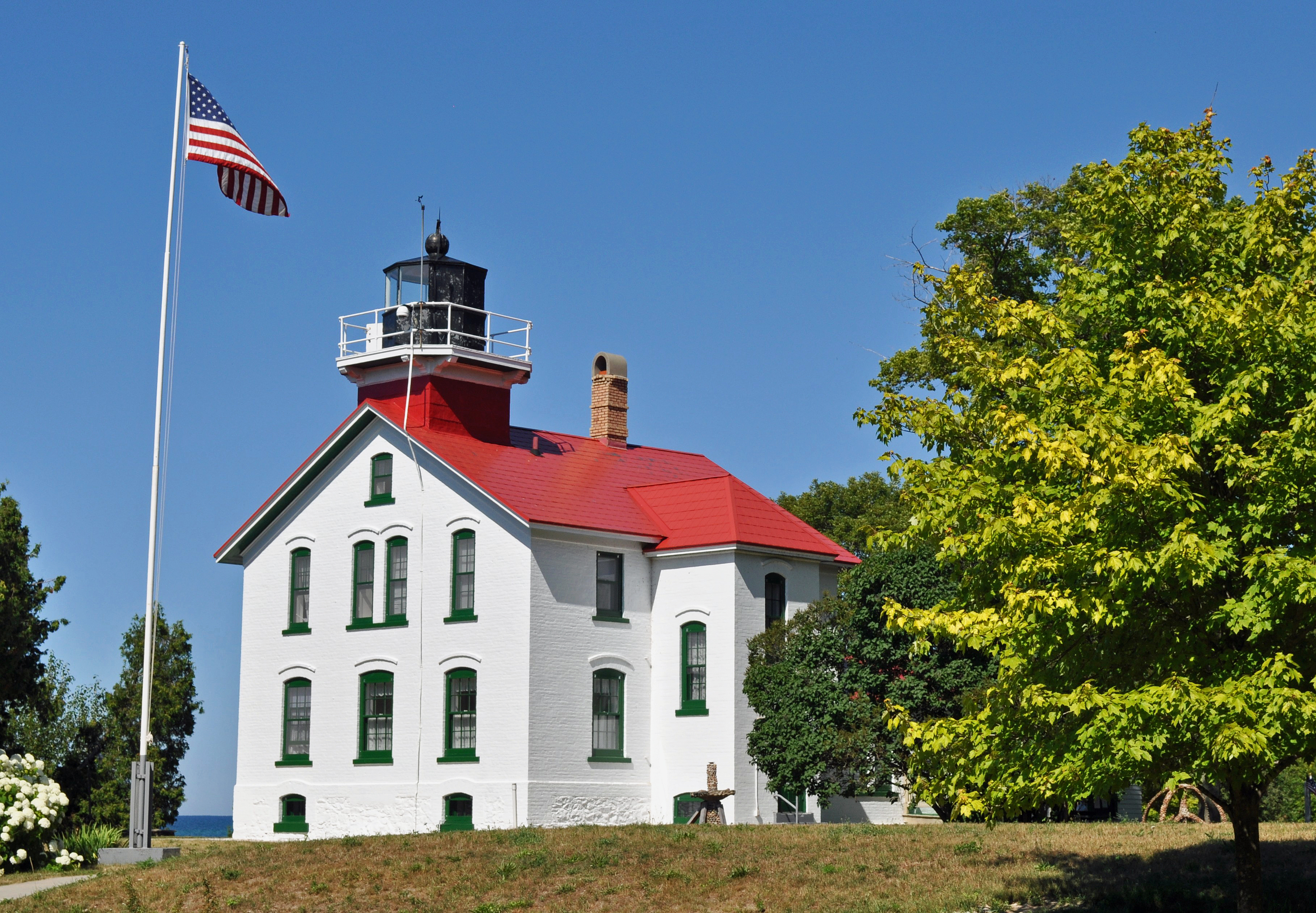
Grand Traverse Light

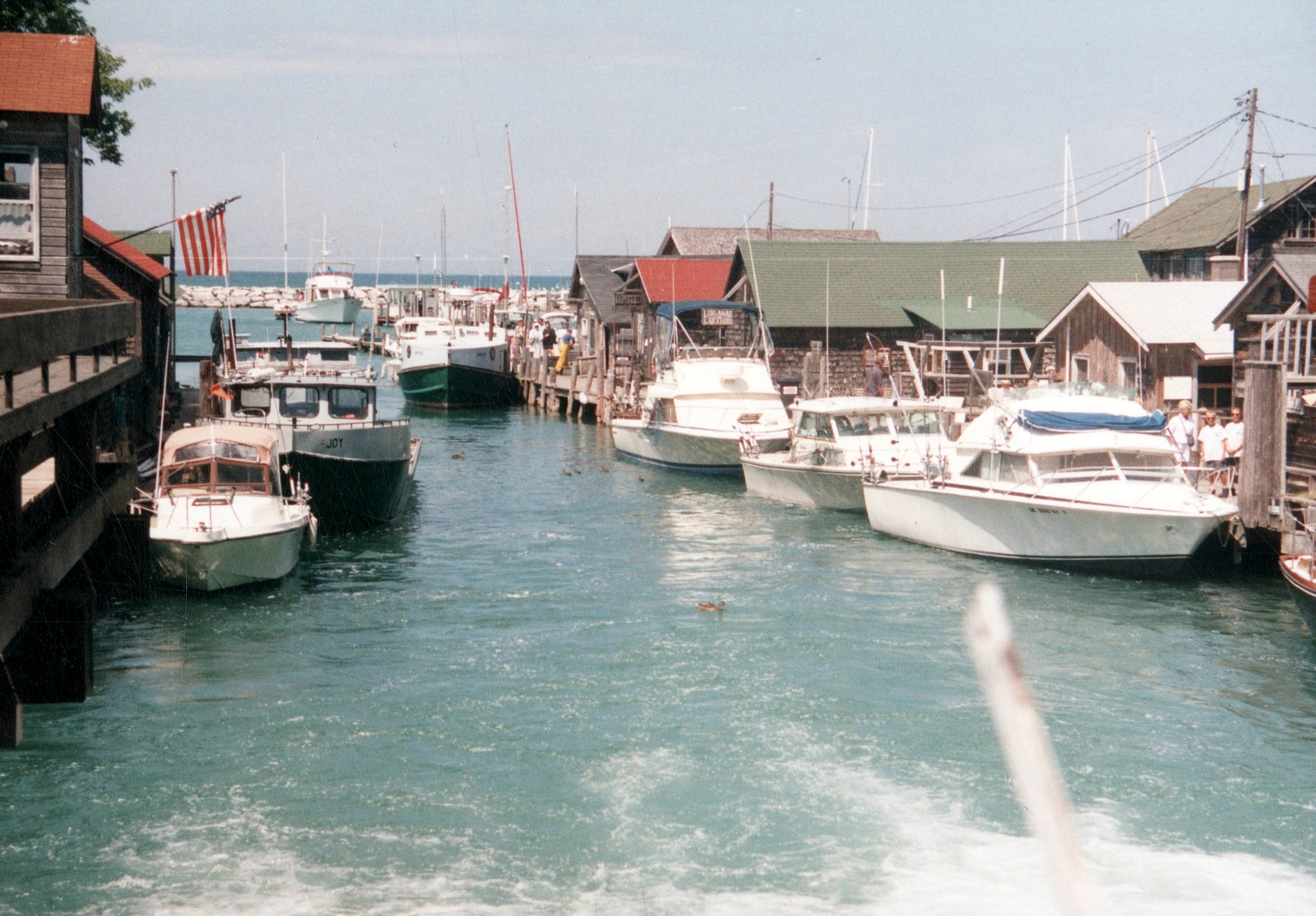
Historic Fishtown in Leland

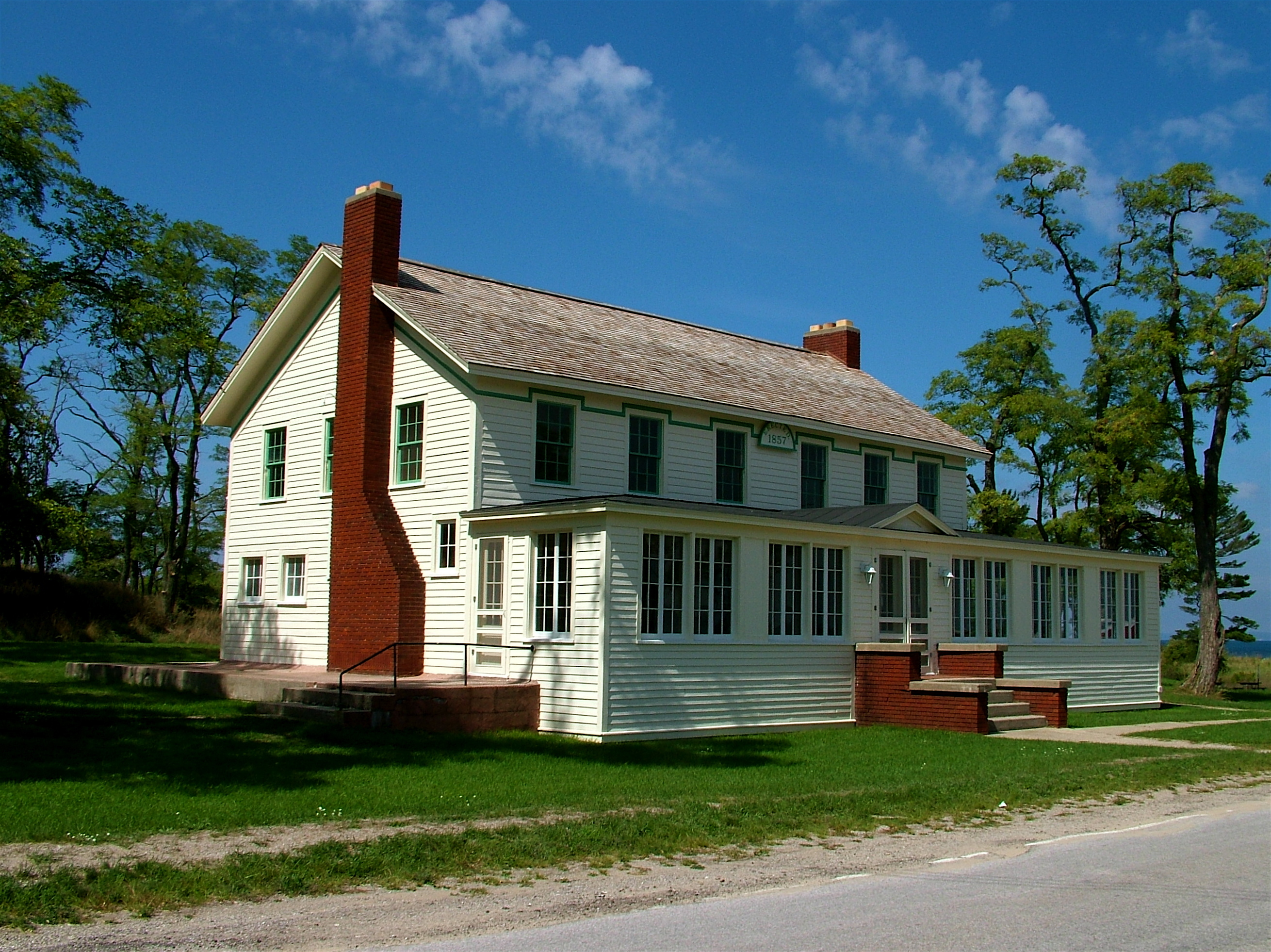
Historic Sleeping Bear Inn in Glen Haven

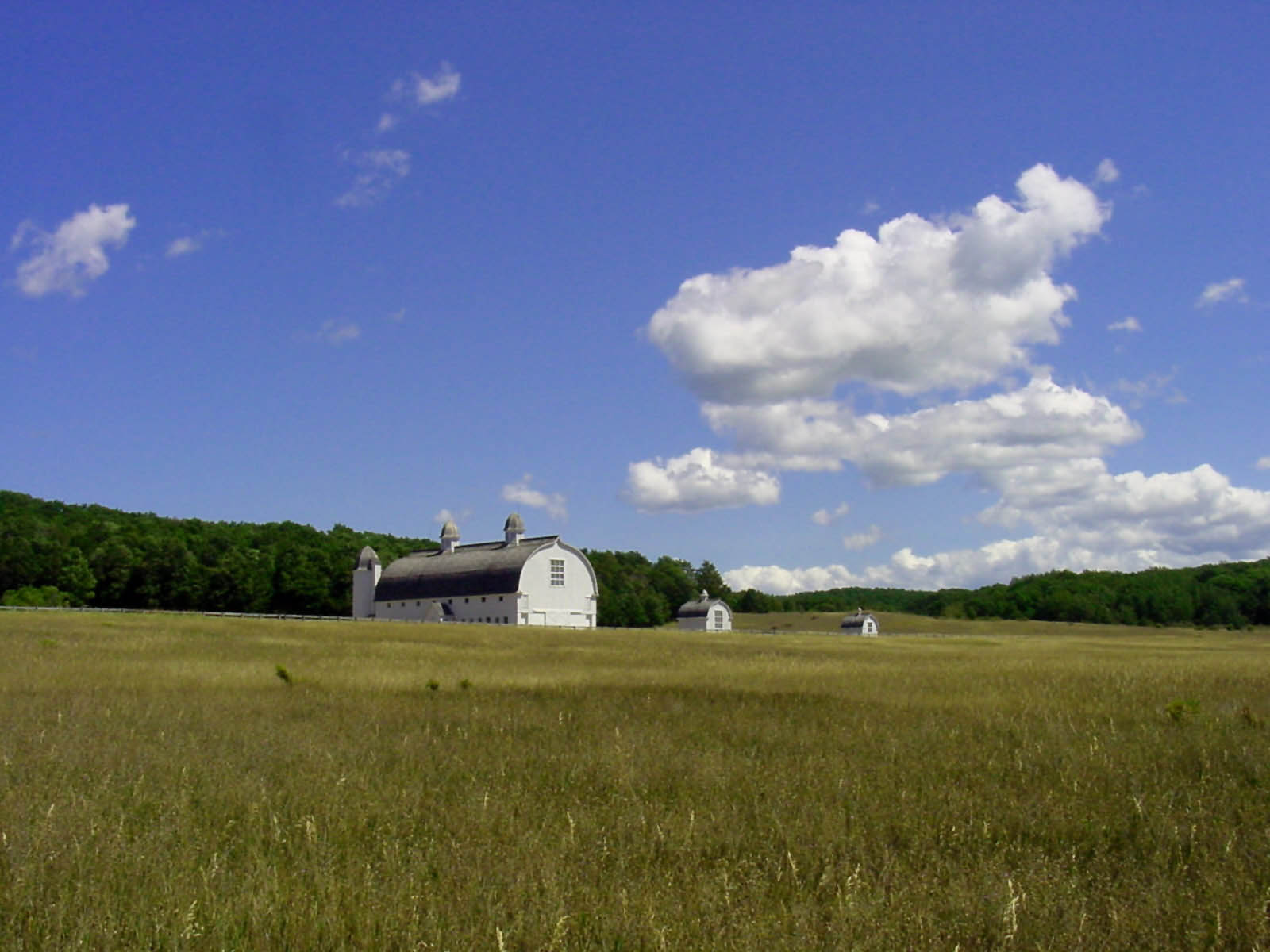
D.H. Day Farm (Oswegatchi) near Glen Arbor

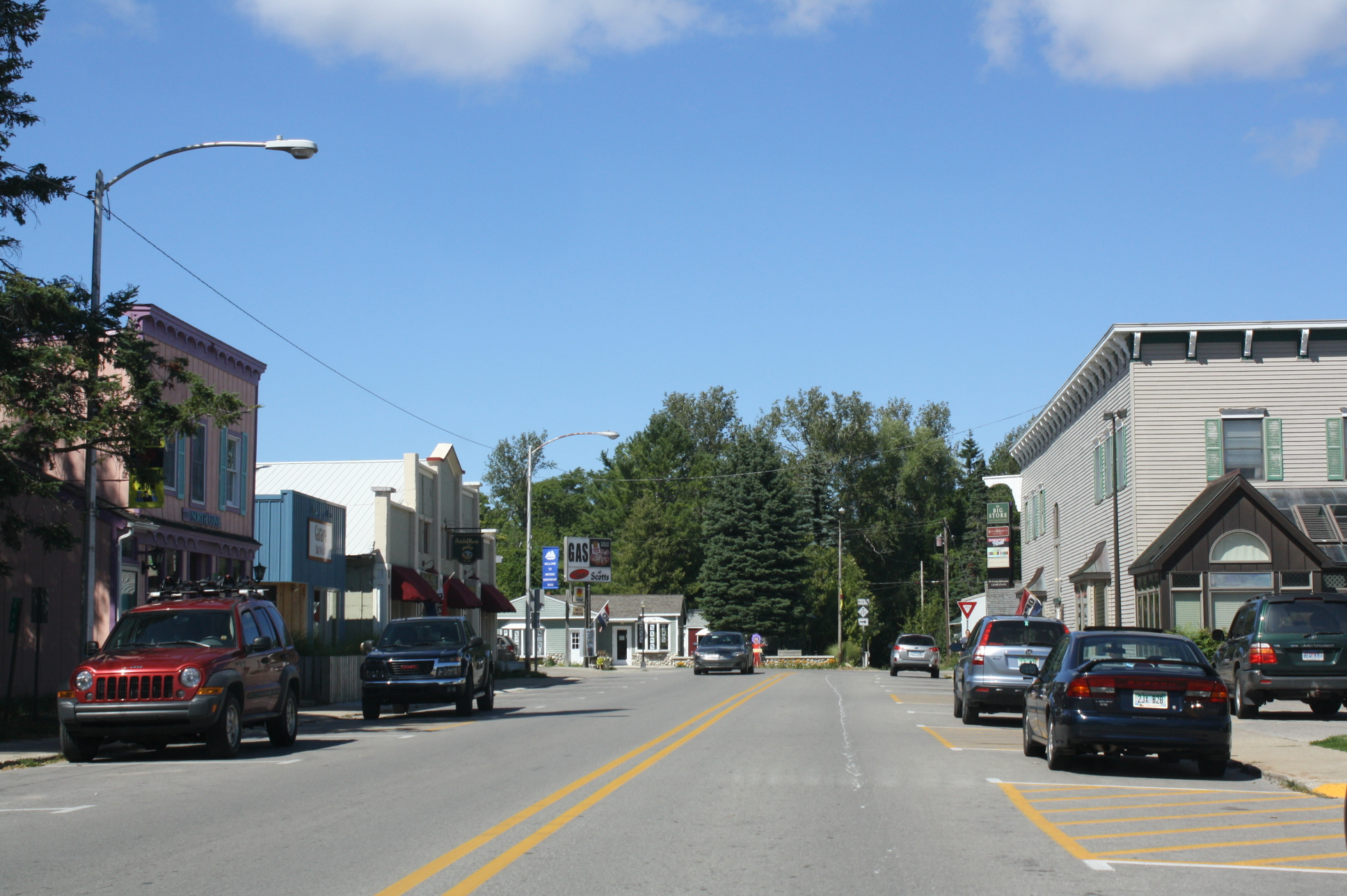
Downtown Northport

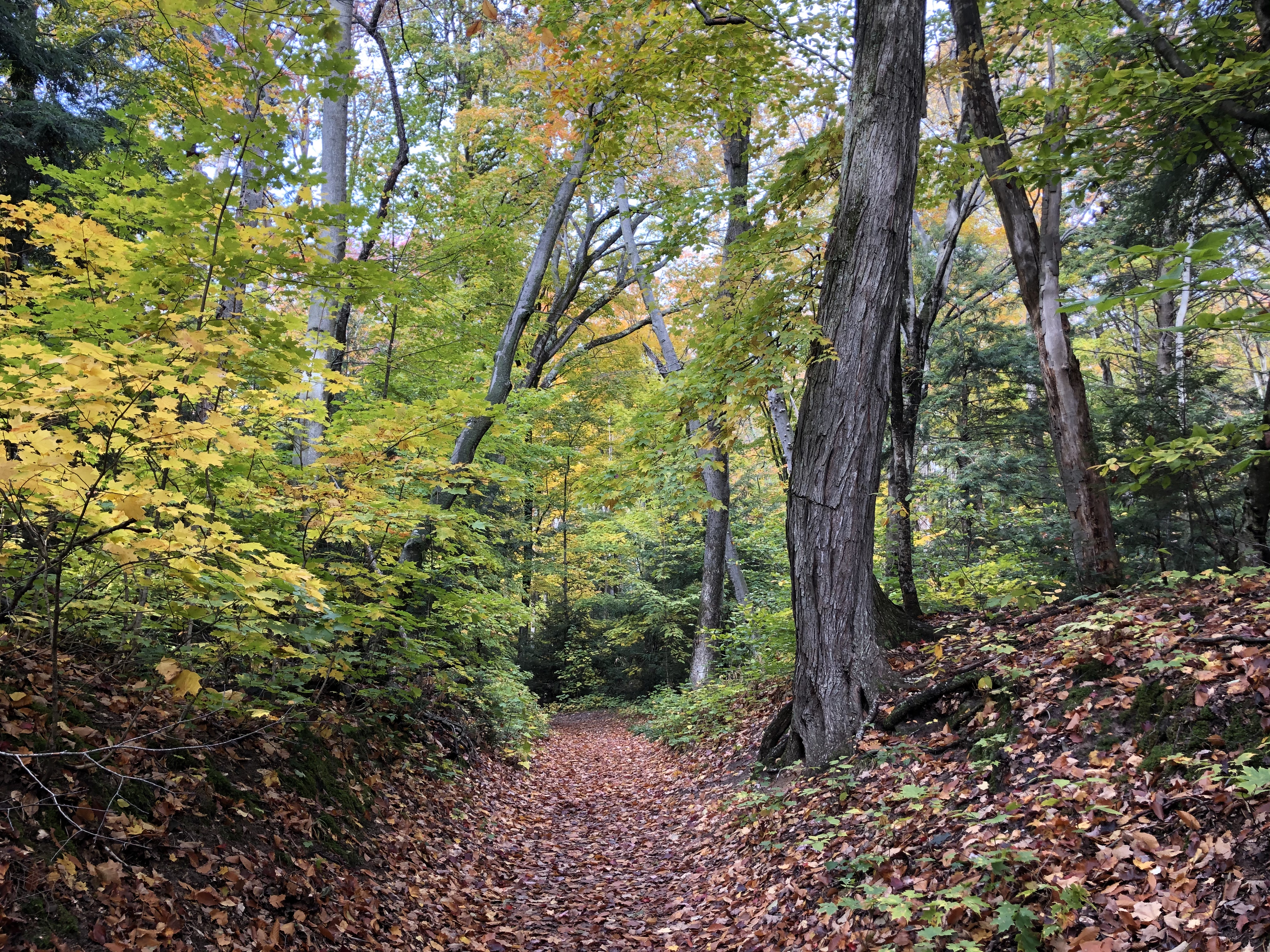
Hiking trail in Leelanau State Park

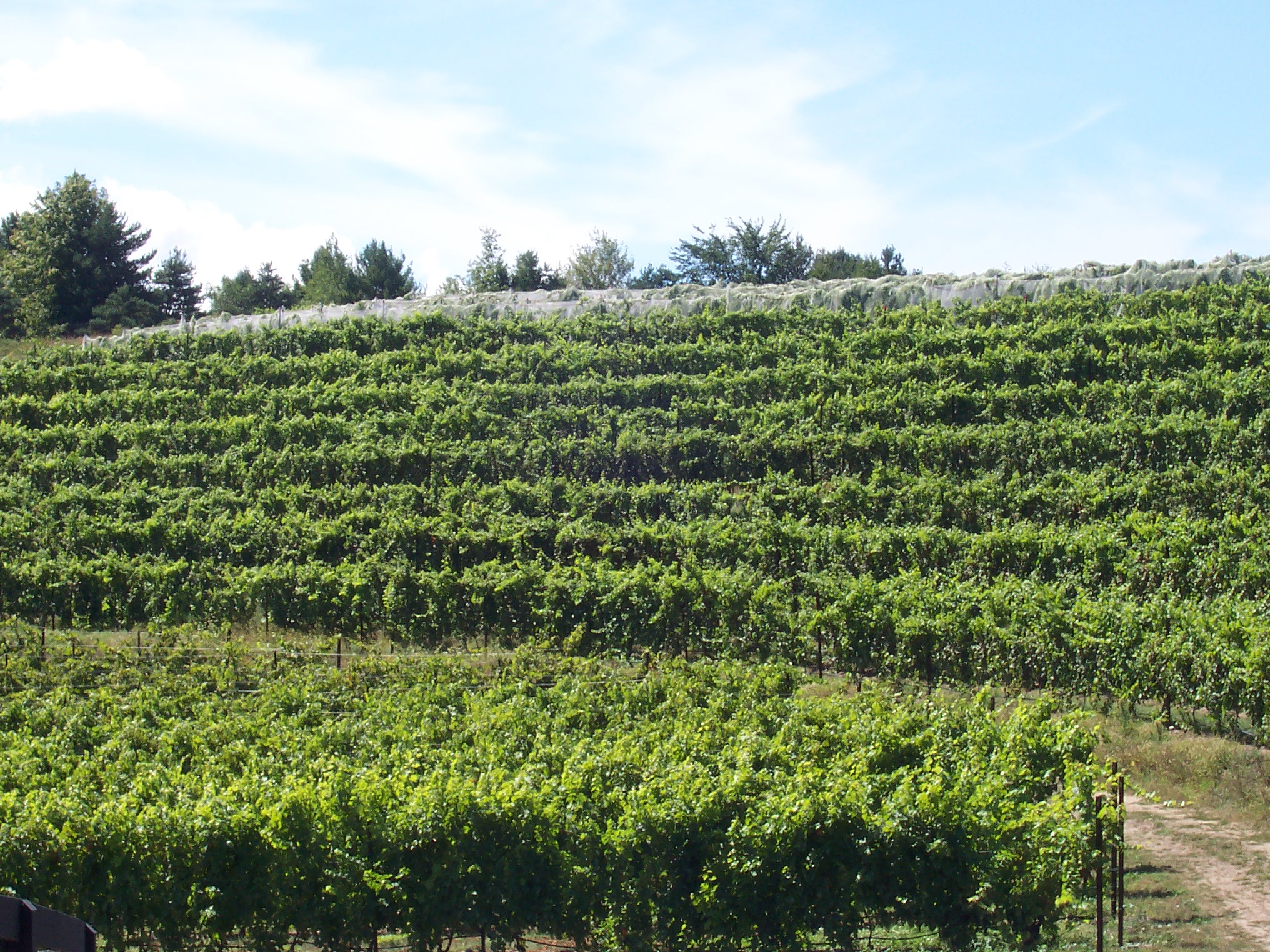
Vineyard on the Leelanau Peninsula

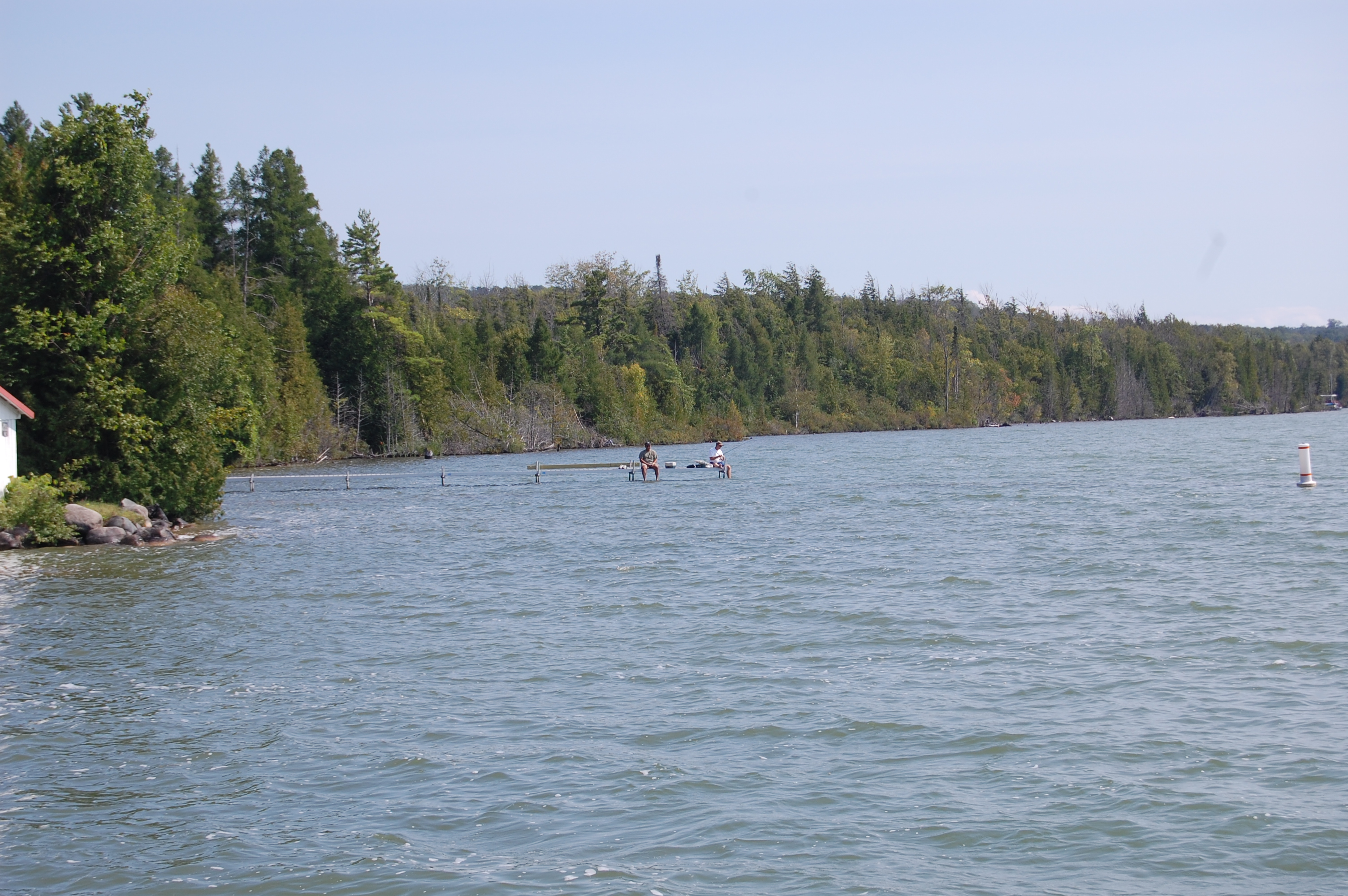
Lake Leelanau from Fountain Point Resort

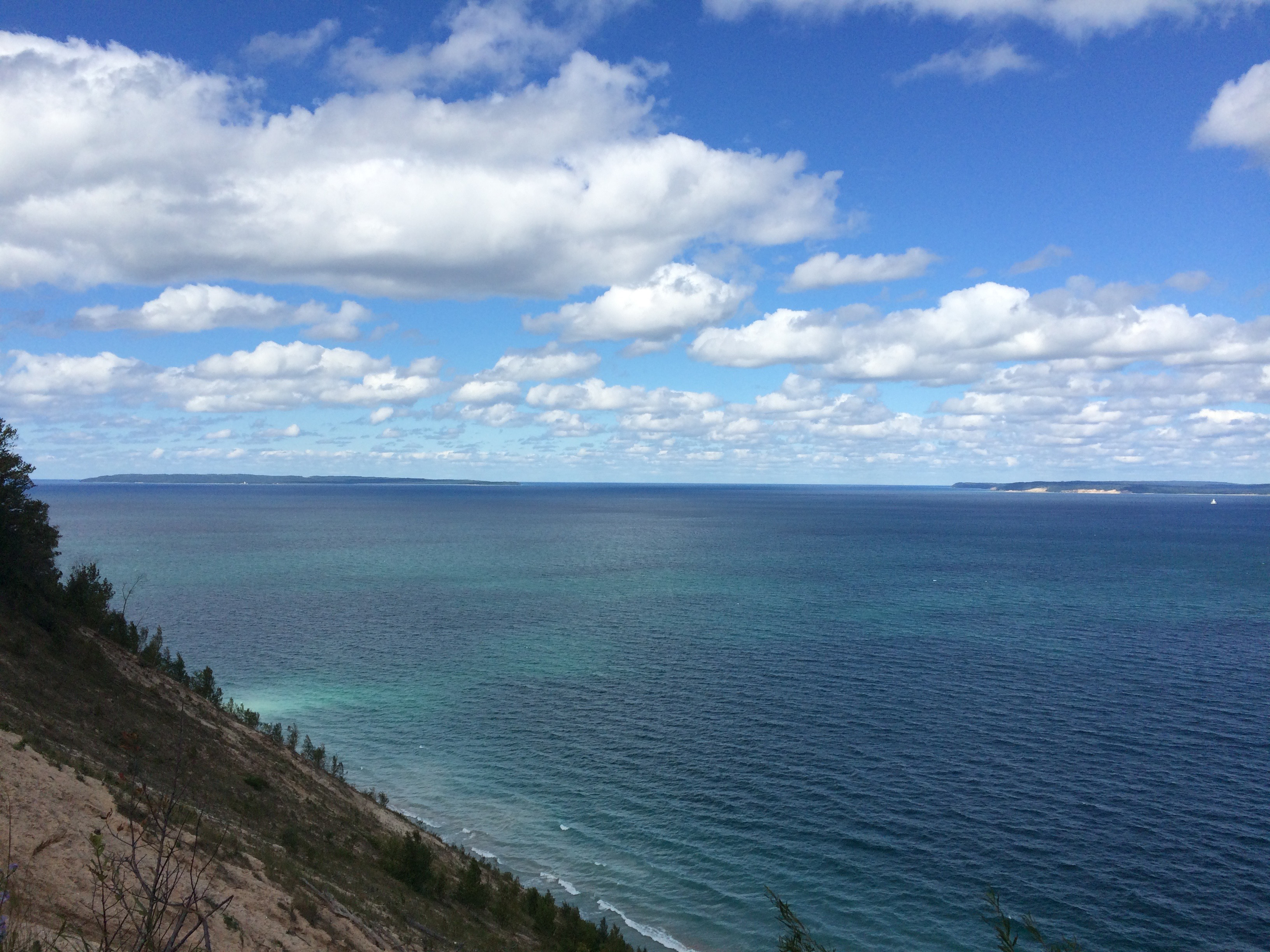
Lake Michigan from Pyramid Point

== See also ==
- Door Peninsula
- Garden Peninsula
- Keweenaw Peninsula
- The Thumb
