= Leelanau State Park =

Park in Michigan, USA

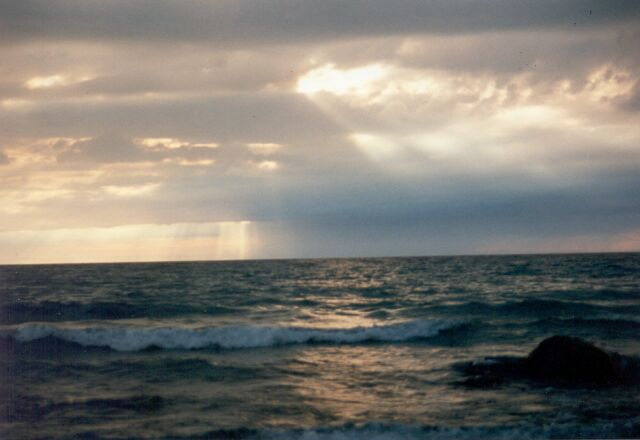
- Sunset over Lake Michigan from Grand Traverse Point

- Location within Michigan Location within the United States
- Location: Leelanau Township, Leelanau County, Michigan, United States
- Nearest town: Northport, Michigan
- Coordinates: 45°11′00″N 85°34′10″W
- Area: 1,550 acres (630 ha)
- Elevation: 610 feet (190 m)
- Established: 1964
- Administrator: Michigan Department of Natural Resources
- Designation: Michigan state park
- Website: Official website

Leelanau State Park is a public recreation area covering 1,550 acres (630 ha) on the Leelanau Peninsula in Leelanau County, Michigan. The state park encompasses the tip of the peninsula and is the home of the Grand Traverse Lighthouse.

== Activities and amenities ==
In addition to the lighthouse museum, the park offers 8.5 miles (13.7 km) of hiking and skiing trails, picnicking, playground, cabins, and rustic camping.
