= National Register of Historic Places listings in Grand Traverse County, Michigan =

The following is a list of Registered Historic Places in Grand Traverse County, Michigan.
This National Park Service list is complete through NPS recent listings posted September 26, 2025.

	Name on the Register	Image	Date listed	Location	City or town	Description
1	American Legion Memorial Bridge	American Legion Memorial Bridge	January 7, 2000 (#99001650)	S. Cass St. over Boardman R. 44°45′41″N 85°37′15″W	Traverse City	The American Legion Memorial Bridge is a reinforced concrete arch bridge completed in 1930.
2	Boardman Neighborhood Historic District	Boardman Neighborhood Historic District	October 3, 1978 (#78001498)	Roughly bounded State and Webster Sts., and Railroad and Boardman Aves. 44°45′42″N 85°36′45″W	Traverse City	The Boardman Neighborhood is a primarily residential historic district, including approximately 174 structures, the majority of them well-maintained Victorian wood-frame residences covered with clapboard siding. Structures range from lavish houses built for some of the city's most prominent late 19th-century residents to more modest homes originally owned by small businessmen and lumber company employees.
3	Central Neighborhood Historic District	Central Neighborhood Historic District	December 11, 1979 (#79001154)	Roughly bounded by 5th, Locust, Union, 9th, and Division Sts. 44°45′45″N 85°37′45″W	Traverse City	The Central Neighborhood was started around the turn of the century, with the majority of the houses in the neighborhood constructed between 1890 and 1914. The neighborhood is unique for the socio-economic diversity of its residents.
4	City Opera House	City Opera House	September 7, 1972 (#72000616)	106-112 Front St. 44°45′50″N 85°37′22″W	Traverse City	The city Opera House was constructed in 1891. In 1920, a movie theatre chain leased the opera house and closed it to prevent competition. It remained closed until 1985.
5	Dougherty Mission House	Dougherty Mission House	April 8, 2011 (#11000176)	18459 Mission Road; 44°57′25″N 85°29′27″W	Peninsula Township	The Dougherty Mission House was constructed in 1842 by Reverend Peter Dougherty, who had three years earlier established the mission from which Old Mission, Michigan takes its name. Dougherty lived there until 1852, when he established the "New Mission" at Omena, Michigan. The house was later used as an inn. It is thought to be the first post and beam house constructed in Michigan's lower peninsula north of Grand Rapids, Michigan.
6	Fife Lake–Union District No. 1 Schoolhouse	Fife Lake–Union District No. 1 Schoolhouse	August 27, 1987 (#87001433)	5020 Fife Lake Rd. 44°36′45″N 85°21′14″W	Fife Lake	The Fife Lake Schoolhouse was built in 1882, and is unique because of the distinctive design of its Late Victorian porch and belfry.
7	Perry Hannah House	Perry Hannah House	March 16, 1972 (#72000617)	305 6th St. 44°45′40″N 85°37′36″W	Traverse City	The Perry Hannah House was designed in 1891 by Grand Rapids architect W. G. Robinson for lumber baron Perry Hannah, a lumber baron known as the "father of Traverse City." It is now used as the Reynolds-Jonkhoff Funeral Home; the firm maintains the house in outstanding condition.
8	Hedden Hall	Hedden Hall	April 15, 1982 (#82002834)	18599 Old Mission Rd. 44°57′33″N 85°29′30″W	Traverse City	The Old Mission Inn, previously known as Hedden Hall, was built by George and Amanda Hedden in 1874. It has served as an inn since that time.
9	Northern Michigan Asylum	Northern Michigan Asylum	October 3, 1978 (#78001499)	Bounded by RR tracks, Division and 11th Sts., Elmwood Ave., Orange and Red Drs. 44°45′19″N 85°38′26″W	Traverse City	The Northern Michigan Asylum, also known as the Traverse City State Hospital and Traverse City Regional Psychiatric Hospital, was established in 1881. Under the supervision of prominent architect Gordon W. Lloyd, the first building, known as Building 50, was constructed in Victorian-Italianate style according to the Kirkbride Plan.
10	John Pulcipher House	John Pulcipher House	December 7, 2000 (#00001484)	7710 US 31 N 44°47′49″N 85°29′36″W	Acme Township	The John Pulcipher House was built in 1883 for local farmer John Pulcipher. It was continuously inhabited until 1964, when John's niece Jessie died. It stayed empty until 1999, when Nels Veliquette, a local cherry farmer, purchased the house and surrounding property and began restoration to turn it into the Country Hermitage Bed & Breakfast.
11	Skegemog Point Site	Skegemog Point Site	March 24, 1972 (#72001474)	8298 Skegemog Point Rd. 44°48′30″N 85°21′00″W	Williamsburg	The Skegemog Point Site, also known as the Samels Field Site' or Samels Site contains material spanning over 10,000 years. The site is unique in that, due to glacial rebound, it is horizontally stratified rather than vertically stratified.
12	South Union Street-Boardman River Bridge	South Union Street-Boardman River Bridge	January 7, 2000 (#99001651)	S. Union St. over Boardman River; 44°45′43″N 85°37′25″W	Traverse City	The South Union Street-Boardman River Bridge is a girder bridge, constructed in 1931 by the Michigan State Highway Department; at the time it carried US 31.
13	Stickney Summer House-Bowers Harbor Inn	Stickney Summer House-Bowers Harbor Inn	April 8, 2011 (#11000178)	13512 Peninsula Dr. 44°53′10″N 85°31′43″W	Peninsula Township	This 26-room Arts and Crafts, Storybook style house was built in 1928 for Charles and Jennie Stickney. After the Stickney's death in the late 1940s, the house was remodeled into a restaurant, the Bowers Harbor Inn. The property still houses two restaurants, the Mission Table and the Jolly Pumpkin.

== See also ==
- List of Michigan State Historic Sites in Grand Traverse County, Michigan
- National Register of Historic Places listings in Michigan
- Listings in neighboring counties: Antrim, Benzie, Leelanau, Manistee, Missaukee, Wexford
