= List of Michigan State Historic Sites in Grand Traverse County =

Location of Grand Traverse County in Michigan

The following is a list of Michigan State Historic Sites in Grand Traverse County, Michigan. Sites marked with a dagger (†) are also listed on the National Register of Historic Places in Grand Traverse County, Michigan.

== Current listings ==
Name	Image	Location	City	Listing date
City Opera House†		106-112 Front Street	Traverse City	October 29, 1971
Congregation Beth El		312 South Park Street	Traverse City	October 21, 1975
Dougherty Mission	Dougherty Mission and Inn facing NW	18459 Mission	Old Mission	February 18, 1956
East Bay Township School District No. 2 School		5825 Yuba Road	Acme vicinity	May 10, 1990
Fife Lake–Union District No. 1 Schoolhouse†		5020 Fife Lake Road	Fife Lake vicinity	October 27, 1983
Grand Rapids and Indiana Railroad		Roadside Park on US-131, NE of Fife Lake	Fife Lake vicinity	February 12, 1959
Grand Traverse Bay Informational Designation		Clinch Park	Traverse City	July 19, 1956
Grand Traverse County Courthouse		333 Boardman	Traverse City	July 26, 1974
Perry Hannah House†		305 Sixth Street	Traverse City	October 29, 1971
Hedden Hall†		18599 Old Mission Road	Old Mission	February 27, 1980
Joseph Hessler Log House		20500 Center Road	Old Mission	
Old Mission Peninsula Lighthouse Park		20500 Center Road	Traverse City	July 15, 1999
Interlochen	Kresge Auditorium-Interlochen. Open air Amphitheater.	Highway M-137, 1 mile south of Interlochen	Interlochen	November 14, 1961
Ladies Library Building		216 Cass Avenue	Traverse City	May 8, 1986
Mac's Super Service Station		501 South Union Street	Traverse City	April 28, 1987
Mission Point Lighthouse		Center Road (M-37)	Old Mission	October 15, 1992
Northern Michigan Asylum†		Bounded by C&O RR tracks, Division and 11th streets, Elmwood Ave, Orange and Red drives	Traverse City	October 26, 1985
Site of Novotny's Saloon		423 South Union Street	Traverse City	September 10, 1979
Old Mission Congregational Church		Old Mission Road	Old Mission	September 24, 1984
Park Place Hotel		300 E State Street	Traverse City	May 10, 1990
Sleder's Tavern		717 Randolph	Traverse City	January 13, 1981
Weight Station	Weigh Station	14322 Peninsula Drive -Intersection of Peninsula Drive and Bowers Harbor Rd	Traverse City	July 20, 1982
Wilhelm Brothers Store		427 South Union	Traverse City	November 26, 1985

== See also ==
- National Register of Historic Places listings in Grand Traverse County, Michigan

== Sources ==
- Historic Sites Online – Grand Traverse County. Michigan State Housing Developmental Authority. Accessed January 23, 2011.
