= Old mission =

Old mission (or Old Mission) may refer to:

== Organizations ==
- Old Brewery Mission, a charitable organization in Quebec, Canada
- Old Catholic Mission in France, a Christian denomination in France
- Old Mission Beach Athletic Club RFC, a rugby team based in San Diego, California

== Places ==
- Old Mission House, a historic church in Fort Yukon, Alaska
- Old Mission Dam, a dam near San Diego, California
- Old Mission State Park, state park in northern Idaho

=== Michigan ===
- Old Mission Inn, a historic structure north of Traverse City
- Old Mission, Michigan, and unincorporated community
- Old Mission Peninsula, a peninsula within Grand Traverse Bay of Lake Michigan
- Old Mission Peninsula AVA, prominent region for the Michigan wine industry
- Old Mission Point, the cape of Old Mission Peninsula
- Old Wing Mission, a historic structure in Holland

== See also ==
- Mission (disambiguation)
