= Union Township, Grand Traverse County, Michigan =

Union Township, Michigan
- Civil township
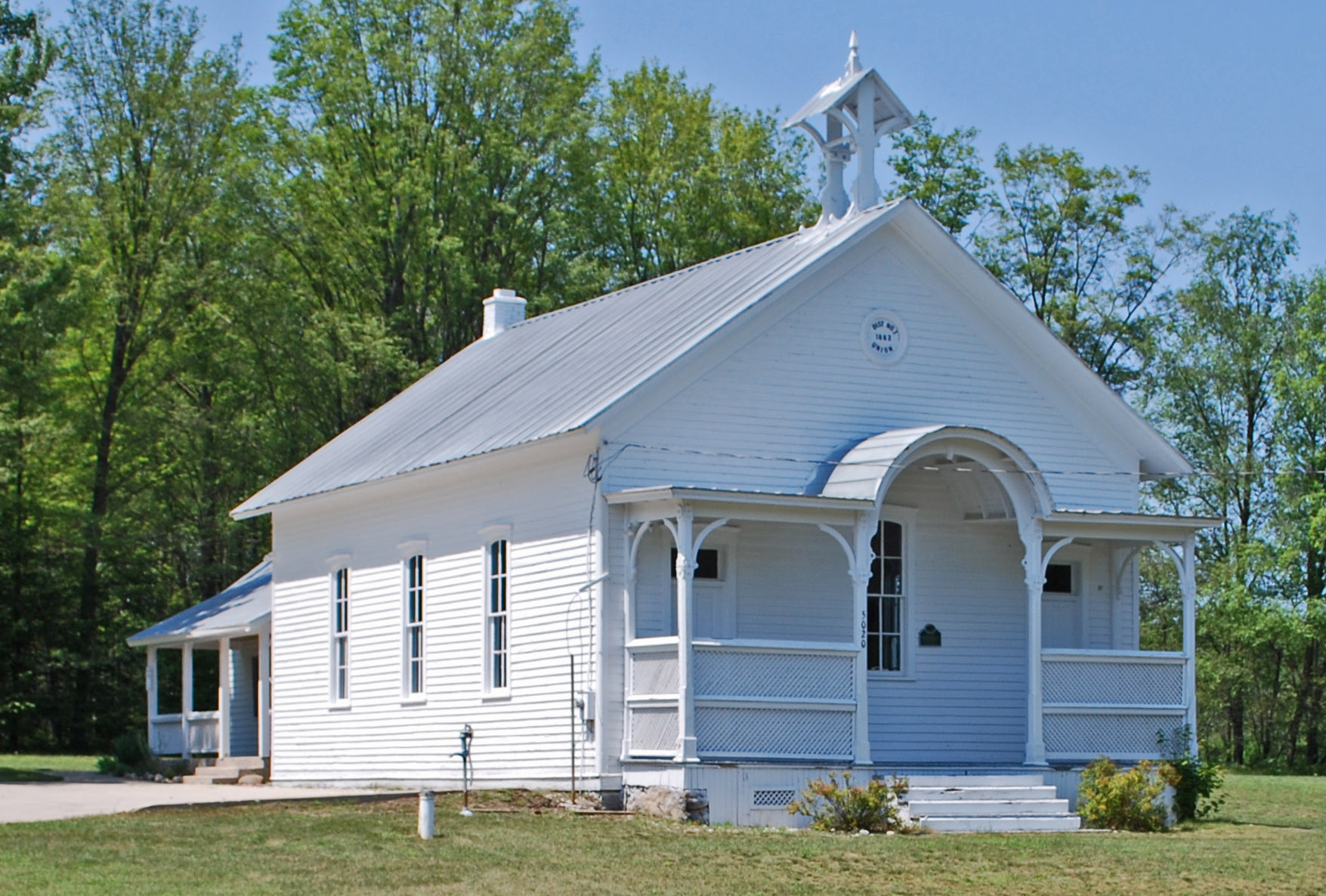
- Union Township Hall

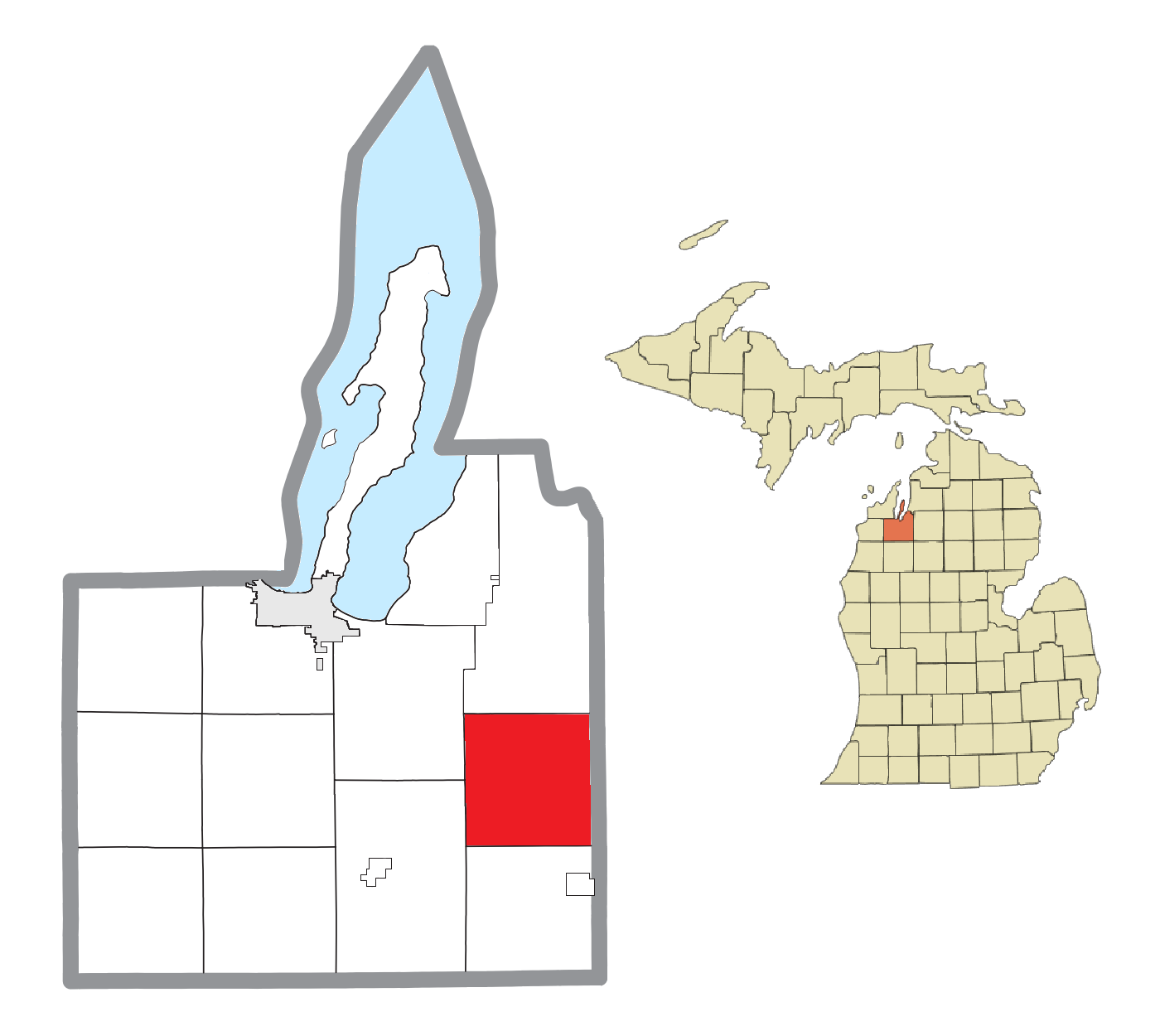
- Location within Grand Traverse County

- Location within the state of Michigan
- Coordinates: 44°38′39″N 85°23′23″W
- Country: United States
- State: Michigan
- County: Grand Traverse
- Organized: 1884

Government
  - Supervisor: Doug Mansfield

Area
  - Total: 36.0 sq mi (93.2 km^{2})
  - Land: 35.8 sq mi (92.8 km^{2})
  - Water: 0.15 sq mi (0.4 km^{2})
- Elevation: 889 ft (271 m)

Population (2020)
  - Total: 514
  - Density: 14/sq mi (5.5/km^{2})
- Time zone: UTC-5 (Eastern (EST))
  - Summer (DST): UTC-4 (EDT)
- ZIP code(s): 49633 (Fife Lake); 49649 (Kingsley); 49680 (South Boardman); 49696 (Traverse City)
- Area code: 231
- FIPS code: 26-81320
- GNIS feature ID: 1627185
- Website: https://uniontownshipgt.com/

Union Township is a civil township of Grand Traverse County in the U.S. state of Michigan. The population was 514 at the 2020 Census, making it the least populous township in the county. Much of Union Township is protected by the Traverse City Management Unit of the Pere Marquette State Forest.

== History ==
Union Township was organized in October 1884.

== Geography ==
According to the United States Census Bureau, the township has a total area of 36.0 square miles (93.2 km^{2}), of which 35.8 square miles (92.8 km^{2}) is land and 0.2 square mile (0.4 km^{2}) (0.47%) is water. The township is located in the east of Grand Traverse County, sharing a boundary with Kalkaska County.

The primary source of the Boardman River, the confluence of the river's north and south branches, is located in Union Township.

Union Township contains no state trunkline highways. However, US Highway 131 comes within 600 feet (180 m) of the township's southeastern corner.

== Communities ==
- Jacks Landing is an unincorporated community in the northwest of the township, on the shore of Rennie Lake. It is located at 44°40′21″N 85°27′15″W.

== Demographics ==
As of the census of 2000, there were 417 people, 157 households, and 116 families residing in the township. The population density was 11.6 per square mile (4.5/km^{2}). There were 222 housing units at an average density of 6.2 per square mile (2.4/km^{2}). The racial makeup of the township was 97.60% White, 1.20% Native American, and 1.20% from two or more races. Hispanic or Latino of any race were 0.72% of the population.

There were 157 households, out of which 34.4% had children under the age of 18 living with them, 66.2% were married couples living together, 5.1% had a female householder with no husband present, and 25.5% were non-families. 20.4% of all households were made up of individuals, and 2.5% had someone living alone who was 65 years of age or older. The average household size was 2.62 and the average family size was 3.04.

In the township the population was spread out, with 26.1% under the age of 18, 6.0% from 18 to 24, 30.7% from 25 to 44, 31.2% from 45 to 64, and 6.0% who were 65 years of age or older. The median age was 38 years. For every 100 females, there were 124.2 males. For every 100 females age 18 and over, there were 118.4 males.

The median income for a household in the township was $51,250, and the median income for a family was $51,964. Males had a median income of $38,958 versus $26,750 for females. The per capita income for the township was $19,016. About 9.5% of families and 11.0% of the population were below the poverty line, including 9.2% of those under age 18 and none of those age 65 or over.
