= Bowers Harbor Inn =

Historic house in Michigan, United States

- Stickney Summer House–Bowers Harbor Inn
- U.S. National Register of Historic Places
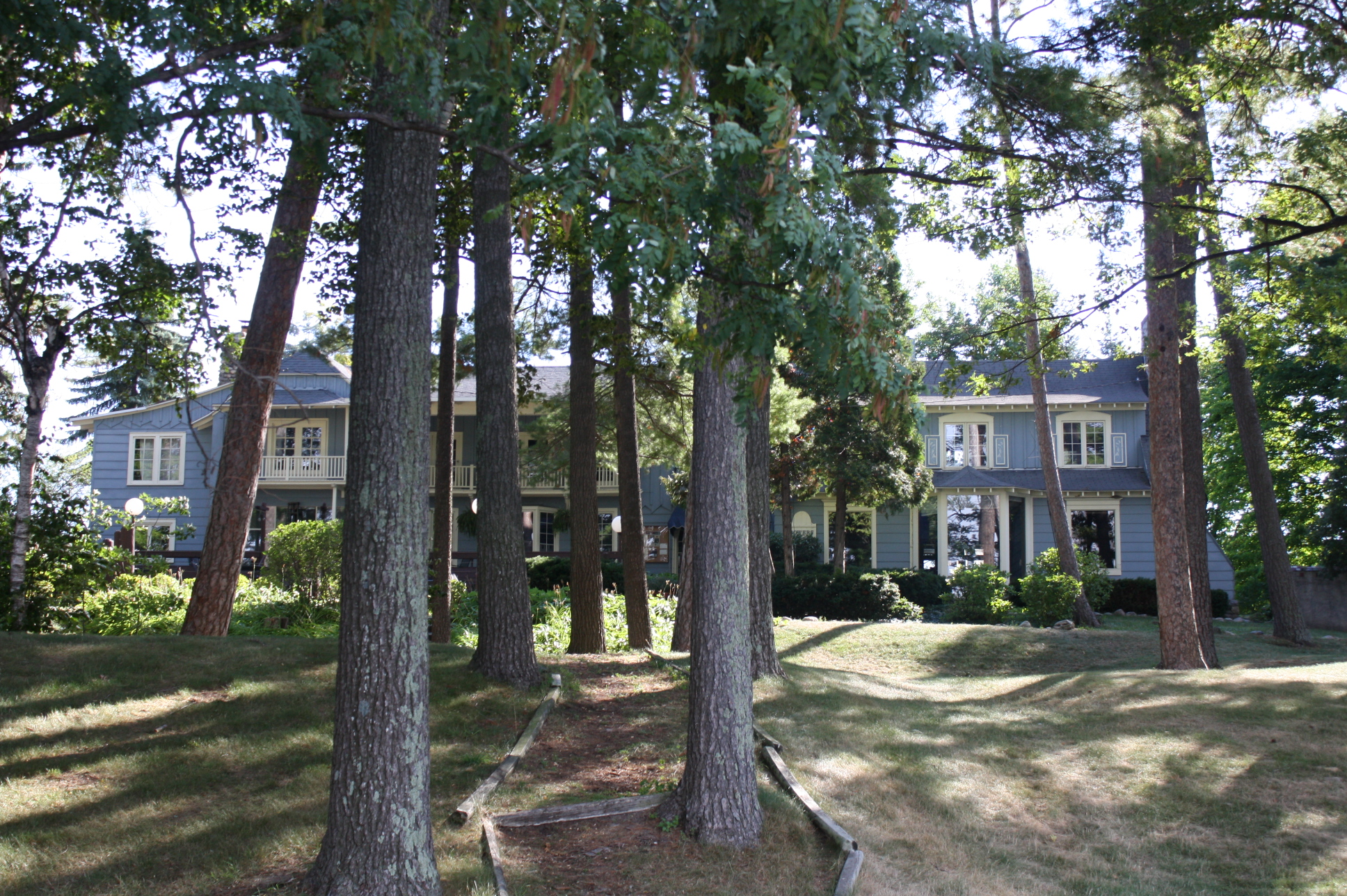

- Location within Michigan Location within the United States
- Interactive map
- Location: 13512 Peninsula Dr., Peninsula Township, Michigan
- Coordinates: 44°53′10″N 85°31′43″W
- Area: 7.6 acres (3.1 ha)
- Built: 1928
- Architect: Kenneth Betcher Worthen
- Architectural style: Arts and Crafts, Storybook
- NRHP reference No.: 11000178
- Added to NRHP: April 8, 2011

The Bowers Harbor Inn is a restaurant located at 13512 Peninsula Drive in Peninsula Township, Michigan. It was constructed in 1928 as a private house, the Stickney Summer House, and renovated into the restaurant in the late 1950s; it now houses the Mission Table and Jolly Pumpkin Restaurants. The site overlooks the waters of Bowers Harbor, an inlet of Grand Traverse Bay. It was listed on the National Register of Historic Places in 2011.

== History ==
Charles Francis Stickney was born in 1868 in Groveland, Massachusetts, the son of Charles Stickney and Julia G. Noyes. He married Jennie E. Worthen in 1891. By 1900, the couple were boarding in Chicago. Charles Stickney's career was as a shoe and boot manufacturer- a family business for several generations. He engaged in that business in St. Paul, MN for several years, having ended that career in the late 1890s. They soon began travelling to the Grand Traverse area, likely taking advantage of the Pere Marquette Railway summer trains that ran from Chicago to Petoskey, Michigan.

In 1909, the Stickneys purchased this property that had been in the family of Chester and Anna Hartson for over 40 years- then a typical Old Mission Peninsula farm with a rather large orchard. They continued the farming use of the property and canned preserves from the orchard harvest, offering them for sale. Charles started the canning business with the Howe brothers in 1910. After a chimney fire in 1927, the Stickneys hired Jennie Stickney's nephew, Kenneth B. Worthen, to design a new summer house, built around the old farmhouse, for their property. Worthern was at the time a principal of Bentley-Worthen Architects in St. Paul, Minnesota, and had made a name for himself by designing many large Twin City residences, many in a distinctive storybook English Cottage style. Worthern designed this 26-room stylized, "a period style house with picturesque elements.... meaning somewhat modern and progressive in approach." Storybook style house for the couple. The house was built at a cost of $175,000, and the Stickneys dubbed it the We-Gwa-Se-Min Ranch.

Jennie Stickney died in 1947 in Grand Rapids, Michigan, and Charles Stickney died two years later in Traverse City. In 1958, Jim and Fern Bryant purchased the Stickneys' property and converted the main house to a restaurant they called the "Bowers Harbor Inn." The restaurant opened in 1959. In 1974, Howard A. Schelde and three business partners purchased the restaurant and renovated it. In 1978, they renovated the previously abandoned east portion of the structure to become a separate casual restaurant, "The Bowery." In 2006, the property was purchased by Jon Carlson and Greg Lobdell, who again renovated the property. They added a microbrewery, turned the Bowery restaurant into The Jolly Pumpkin Restaurant, Microbrewery & Distillery, and turned the Bowers Harbor Inn Restaurant into the Mission Table Restaurant & Tasting Room. The building continues to house the two restaurants, one for fine dining and one casual.

== Description ==
The Stickney Summer House is a large, two story frame Storybook style structure. It consists of the main 1928 house on the west, a "carriage house" on the east (which may have been constructed earlier), and an addition which connects the two separate structures. The main section of the house is approximately 100 feet (30 m) by 25 feet (7.6 m) and faces the lake. The east section, containing the "carriage house" and the connector addition, extends approximately 80 feet (24 m) to the east, giving the entire building a T shape.

The front facade of the house has a central bay with a recessed entrance. The entrance has a heavy wooden door with iron strap hinges, surrounded by glass lights. Above the entrance is a pair of French doors opening onto a small balcony with a wrought iron railing. To the left of the entrance bay is a projecting bay holding a two-story porch with a shallow hip roof. To the right is a three-bay wide section with a central three-sided bay window flanked by a single tall window on each side.

The north side of the house has three small first-floor windows and none on the second floor. This section was originally an open porch, but was enclosed in the 1960s. The south side of the house is dominated by a massive fieldstone and brick end chimney. A pair of French doors flank the chimney on the first floor, and an oriel window protrudes from the chimney's center at the second floor level. A concrete terrace runs across the entire front facade of the building and extends to the south side.

The rear of the house is relatively featureless, with windows only on the second floor. An gable-roofed addition connects the house with a "carriage house" (now the Bowery Restaurant), which is a two-story hip roof structure.

The interior of the structure has a stylized look, with dark stained wood floors and wood trim throughout the restaurant. The front door opens onto an entrance hall with a flagstone floor and a curved staircase with a wrought iron railing. Arched doorways open from there onto two dining rooms. The south one has a polished flagstone floor, plaster walls, a wood cross beam ceiling, and a massive stone fireplace with a rustic beam mantel and flagstone hearth. The north dining room has a brick fireplace, wood cross beam ceilings, and a wooden bar. The upstairs contains rooms which were formerly bedrooms.
