= Boardman Neighborhood Historic District =

Historic district in Michigan, United States

- U.S. National Register of Historic Places
- U.S. Historic district
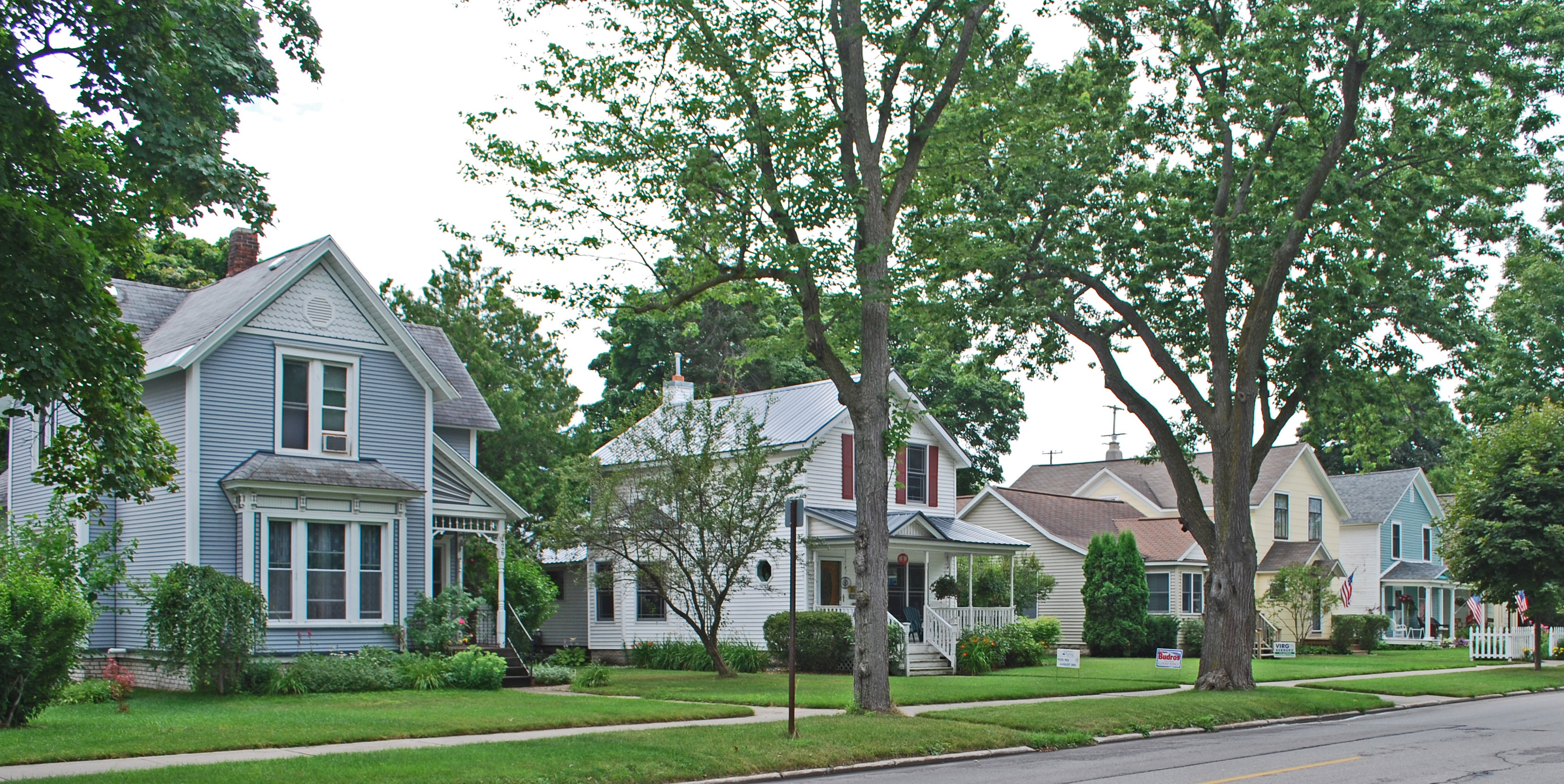

- Location within Michigan Location within the United States
- Interactive map
- Location: Roughly bounded by State and Webster Sts., and Railroad and Boardman Aves., Traverse City, Michigan
- Coordinates: 44°45′42″N 85°36′45″W
- Area: 52 acres (21 ha)
- Architect: W. A. Dean
- Architectural style: Queen Anne
- NRHP reference No.: 78001498
- Added to NRHP: October 3, 1978

The Boardman Neighborhood Historic District is a residential historic district in Traverse City, Michigan, United States, roughly bounded by State Street, Webster Street, Railroad Avenue, and Boardman Avenue. It was listed on the National Register of Historic Places in 1978.

== History ==
The initial construction in the Boardman Neighborhood coincided with the early lumber boom in Traverse City. Notable Traverse City residents, including Captain Henry Boardman, the Havilands, and the Hulls, constructed lavish houses in the neighborhood. Additional construction, such as the 1890s Fair Oaks Terrace, accommodated merchants and professionals of more modest means. The neighborhood declined during the 1920s, and many of the larger houses were converted into apartments or rooming houses, or simply left vacant. However, revitalization starting in the 1970s renewed the single-family character of the neighborhood.

== Description ==
The Boardman Neighborhood Historic District includes approximately 174 structures, the majority of then well-maintained Victorian wood-frame residences covered with clapboard siding. The neighborhood is dense, with many houses occupying half-lots. In addition, the structures range from lavish houses built for some of the city's most prominent late 19th-century residents to more modest homes originally owned by small businessmen and lumber company employees. The neighborhood is primarily residential in character, though some nonresidential structures, such as the city's first general hospital, are within the district.

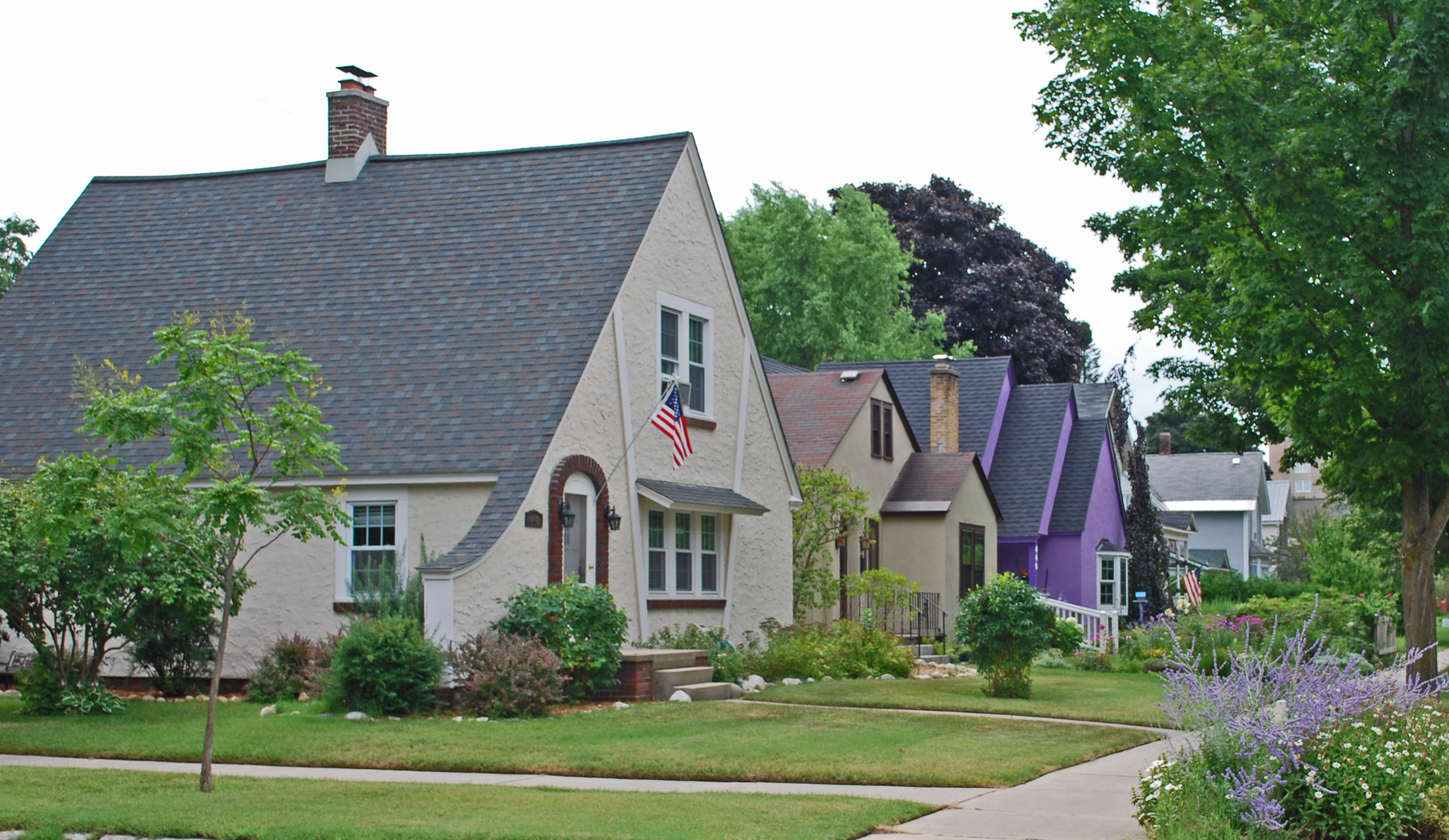

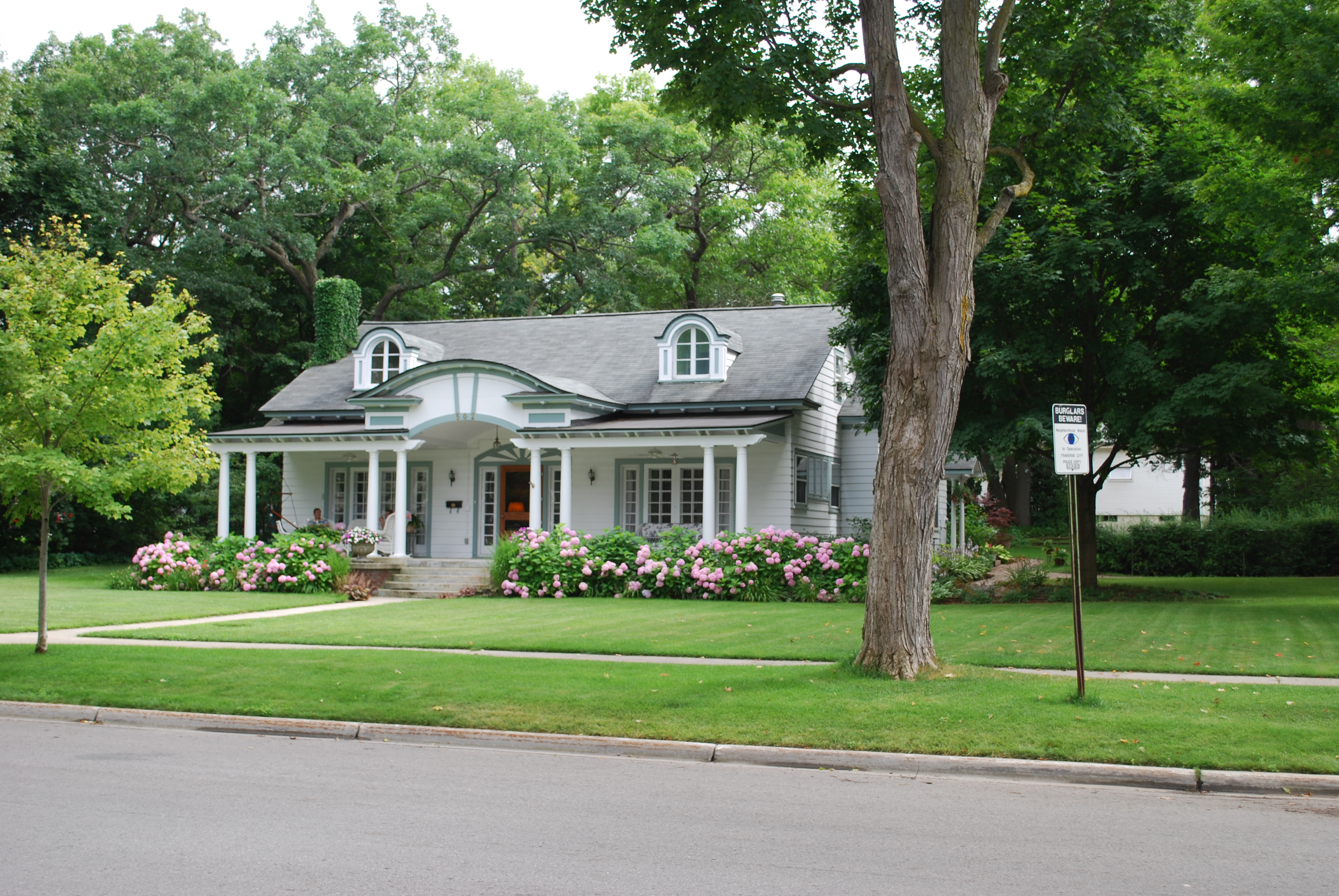

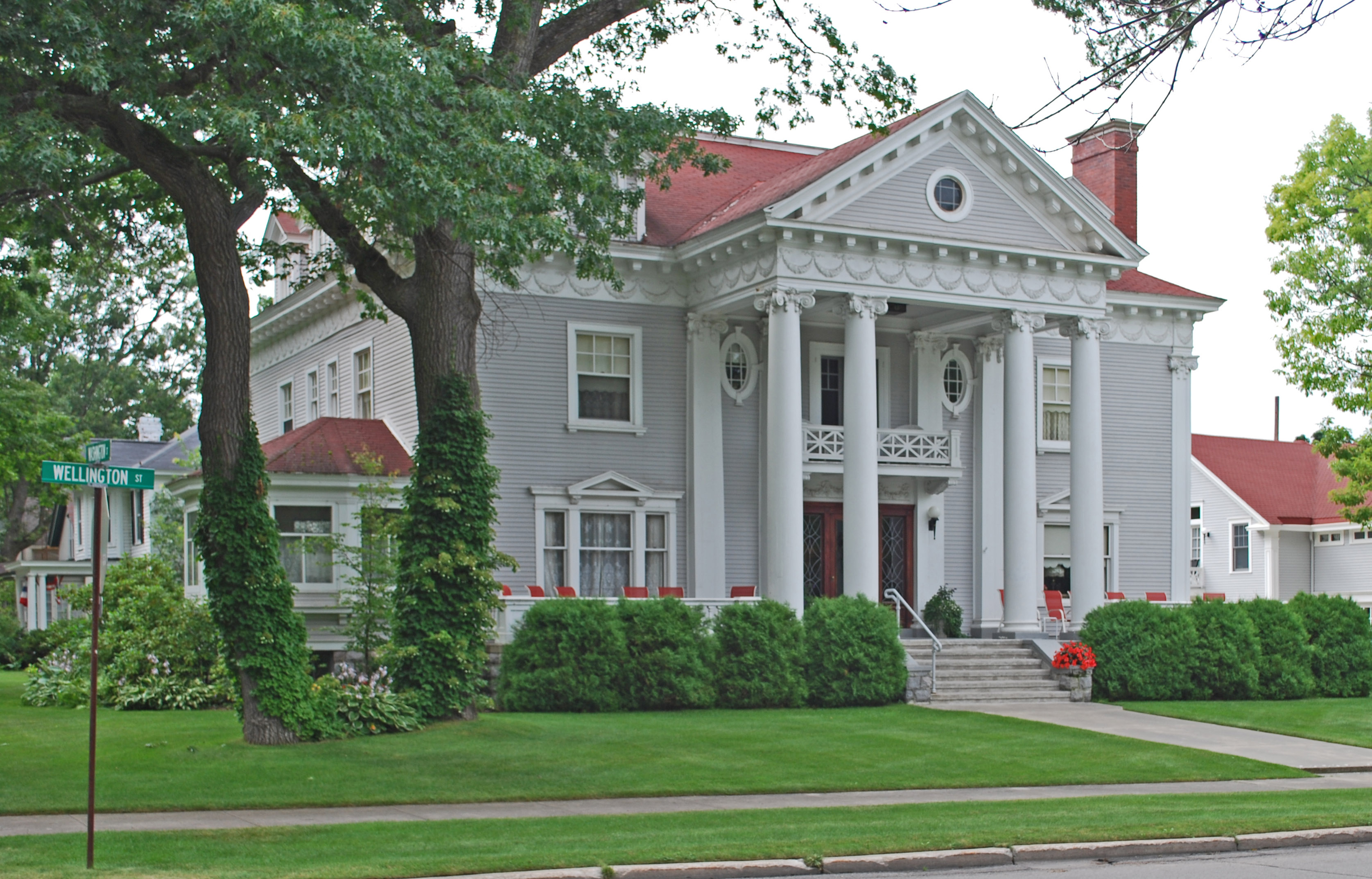

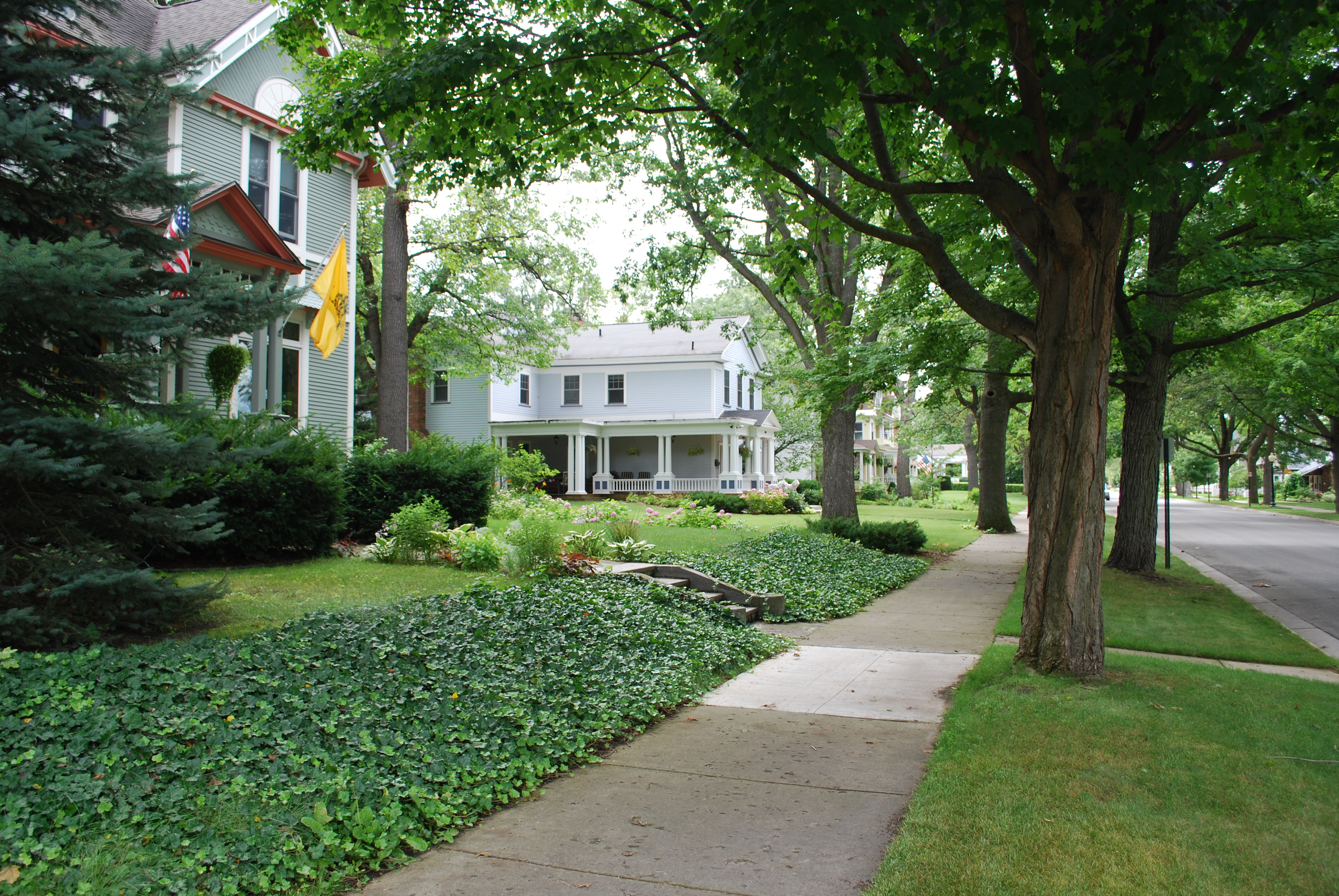
