= John Pulcipher House =

United States national historic place

- U.S. National Register of Historic Places
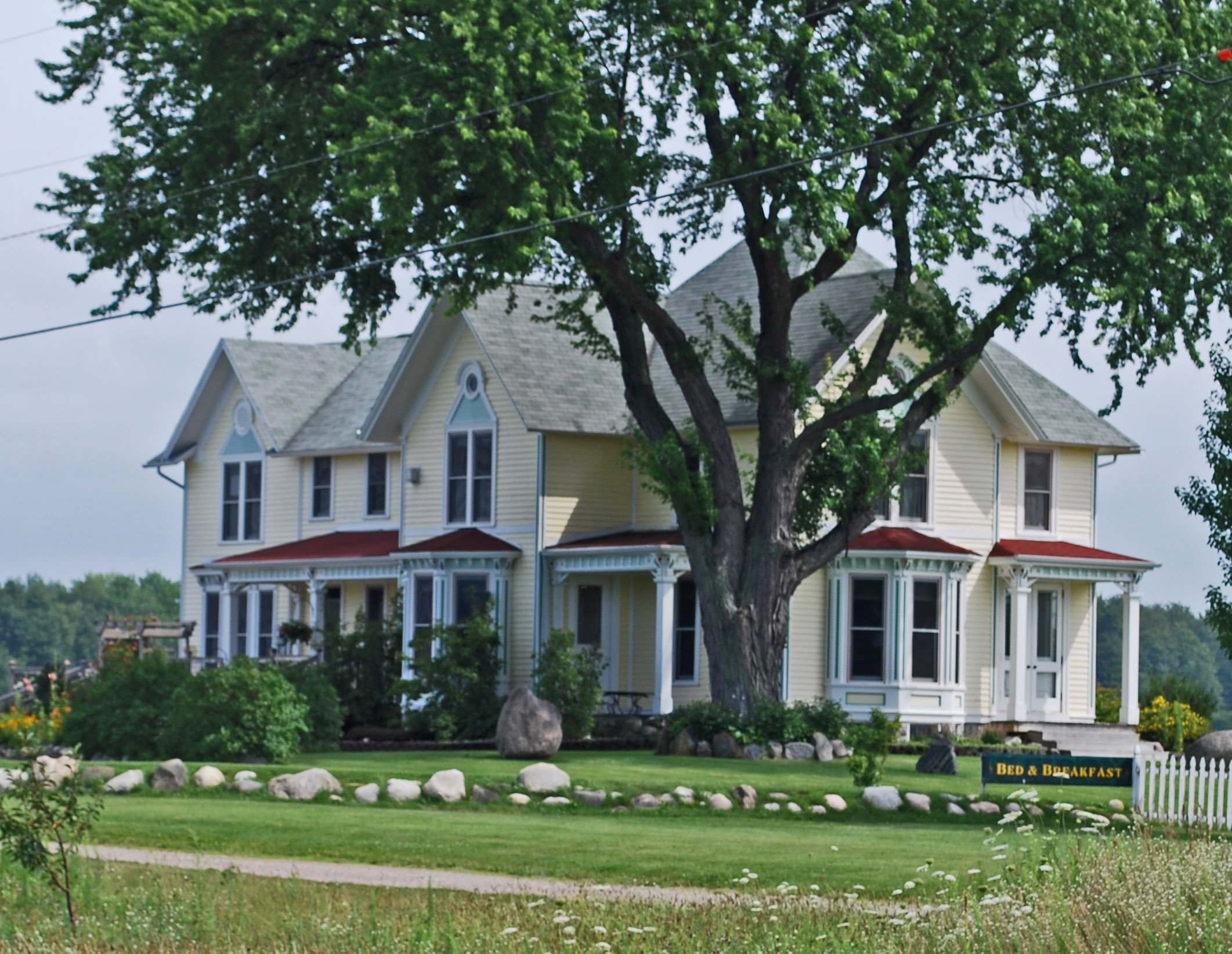

- Location within Michigan Location within the United States
- Interactive map
- Location: 7710 US 31 N, Acme Township, Michigan
- Coordinates: 44°47′49″N 85°29′36″W
- Area: 7.6 acres (3.1 ha)
- Built: 1883
- Architectural style: Stick/Eastlake
- NRHP reference No.: 00001484
- Added to NRHP: December 7, 2000

The John Pulcipher House, also known as the Country Hermitage Bed & Breakfast, is a private house located at 7710 US 31 North, in Acme Township, Michigan. It was listed on the National Register of Historic Places in 2000.

== History ==
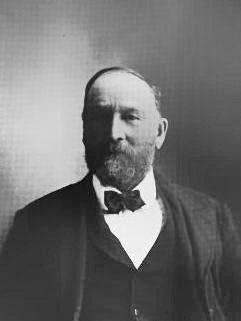
John Pulcipher

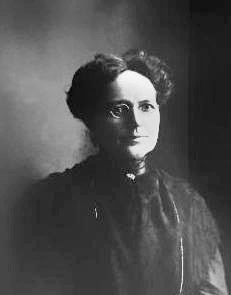
Mary Ann Pulcipher

John Pulcipher was born in Jefferson County, New York in 1838, the son of Edwin and Matilda Pulcipher. In 1855, he moved with his family to homestead on a farm located across the road from where this house now stands. He married Mary Ann Hoover in 1869; the couple had four children. In 1874, Pucipher purchased the original farm, and in 1883 he built this house for $2000. A summer kitchen addition was constructed in 1895. It was continuously inhabited until 1964, when John's niece Jessie died. It stayed empty until 1999, when Nels Veliquette, a local cherry farmer, purchased the house and surrounding property and began restoration. A modern kitchen addition was constructed, and the house was opened as the Country Hermitage Bed & Breakfast.

== Description ==
The John Pulcipher House is an unusually large and fine two-story Stick/Eastlake house. It has a hipped and cross-gable roof. It boasts elaborate millwork detail.
