= City Opera House (Traverse City, Michigan) =

- U.S. National Register of Historic Places
- Michigan State Historic Site
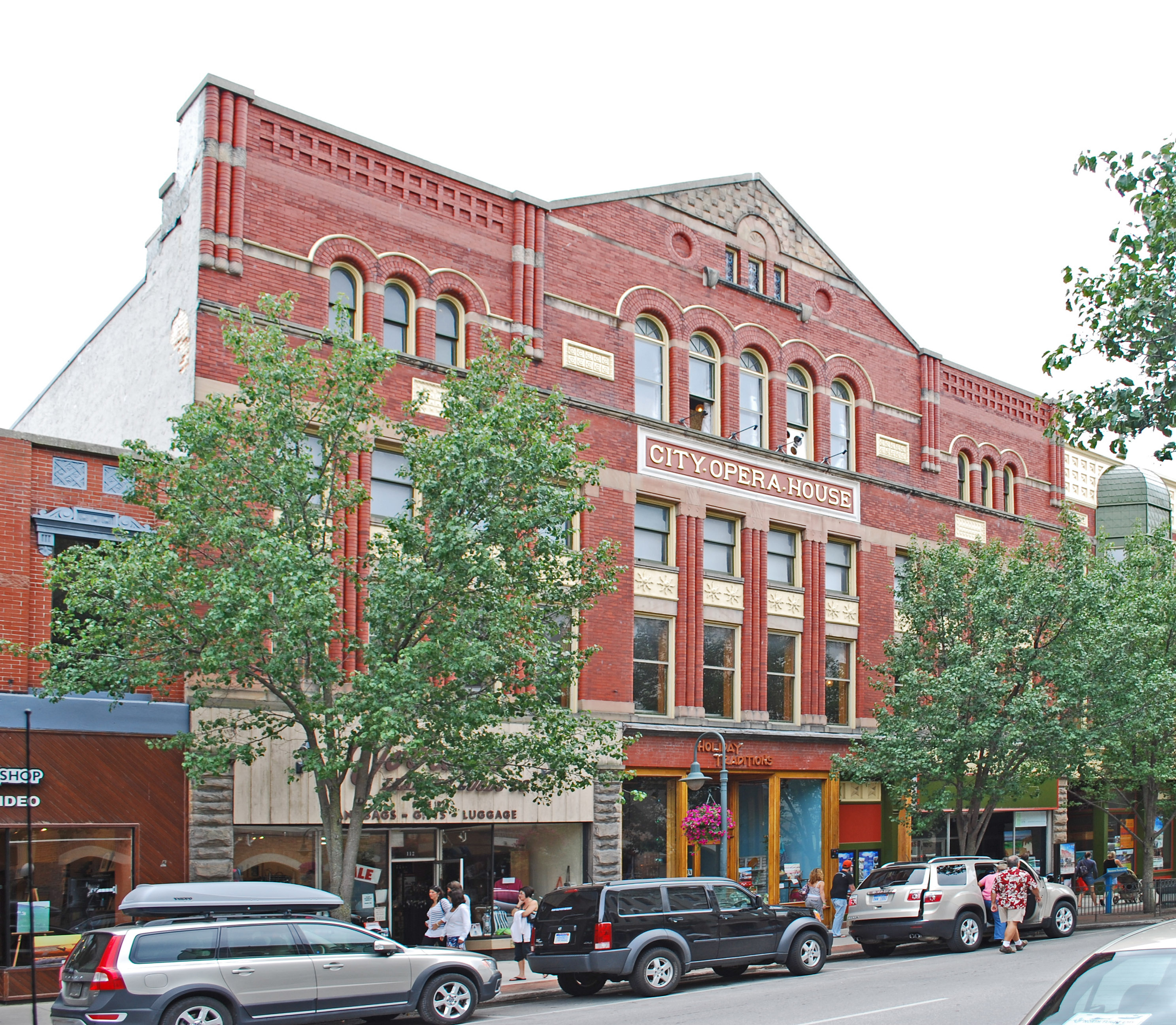

- Location within Michigan Location within the United States
- Interactive map showing the location for the City Opera House
- Location: 106-112 Front St., Traverse City, Michigan
- Coordinates: 44°45′50″N 85°37′22″W
- Area: 1 acre (0.40 ha)
- Built: 1891
- Built by: John Wilhelm
- Architect: E. R. Prall
- NRHP reference No.: 72000616

Significant dates
- Added to NRHP: September 07, 1972
- Designated MSHS: October 29, 1971

The City Opera House is located at 106–112 Front Street in Traverse City, Michigan. It was designated a Michigan State Historic Site in 1971 and listed on the National Register of Historic Places in 1972.

== History ==
In 1891, entrepreneurs Perry Hannah, Charles Wilhelm, Tony Bartok, and Frank Votruba owned the property where the opera house now stands. They hired architect E. R. Prall of Pontiac, Michigan, to design this structure, and builder John Wilhelm to construct it. At the time of construction, it was the first building in Traverse City to use electric lights. The City Opera House provided a 1200-seat performance space for traveling artists as well as a perfect setting for formal balls, such as an Installation Ball held in 1892.

In 1920, a local movie house leased the building and shuttered it to eliminate competition. it was leased through the 1940s, and remained closed until 1985. In 1978, work began to raise money for restoration. In 1980, the owners gave the structure to the city, and restoration work began in 1985. In 2005, the bulk of a 30-year and $8.5 million restoration was completed.

== Description ==
The City Opera House is a square, three-story building constructed of red brick. It measures 110 feet (34 m) on each side. The ground floor houses commercial tenants; the opera house proper is located on the upper floors. Since completion of the restoration, the City Opera House has seating for 710 people, arches with trompe-l'œil clouds and a dome ornamented with angelic putti, a two-story oriel window, an acoustic stage shell, modern theatre rigging, and facilities for catered events.
