= Fife Lake–Union District No. 1 Schoolhouse =

- U.S. National Register of Historic Places
- Michigan State Historic Site
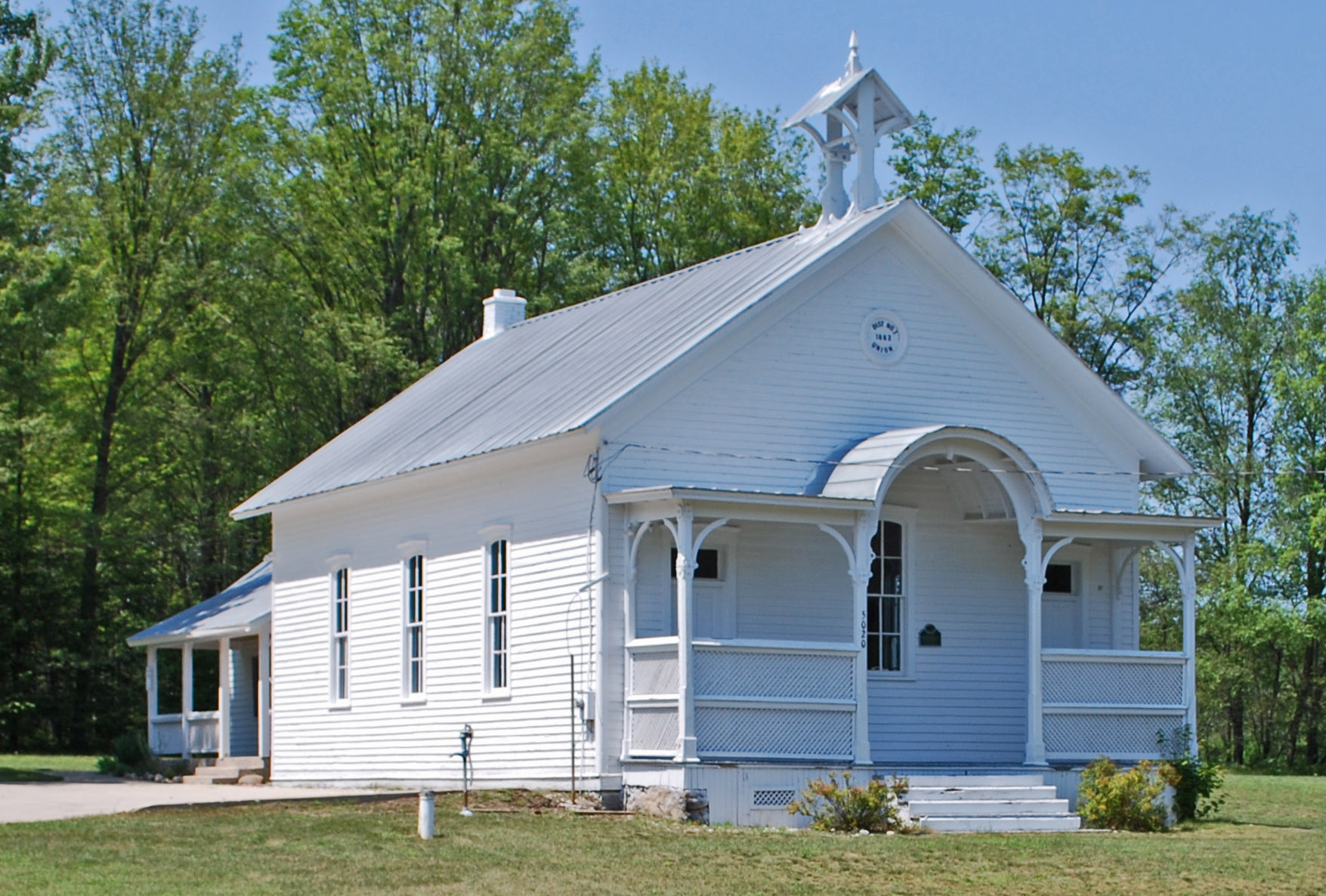

- Location within Michigan Location within the United States
- Interactive map
- Location: 5020 Fife Lake Rd, Fife Lake, Michigan
- Coordinates: 44°36′45″N 85°21′14″W
- Area: 2 acres (0.81 ha)
- Built: 1882
- Built by: John Dewey
- Architectural style: Late Victorian
- NRHP reference No.: 87001433

Significant dates
- Added to NRHP: August 27, 1987
- Designated MSHS: October 27, 1983

The Fife Lake–Union District No. 1 Schoolhouse, also known as the Cedar Creek School of the Union Township Hall, is a school building located at 5020 Fife Lake Road near Fife Lake, Michigan. It was designated a Michigan State Historic Site in 1983 and listed on the National Register of Historic Places in 1987. It is unique because of the distinctive design of its Late Victorian porch and belfry.

== History ==
The Fife Lake Schoolhouse was built in 1882 by local carpenter John Dewey. It was used as a school until the early 1950s. In 1955, Union Township purchased the schoolhouse and converted it into a township hall.

== Description ==
The Fife Lake Schoolhouse is a one-story Late Victorian balloon-frame rectangular structure with a gable roof and clapboard siding. The exterior is generally plain, but the appearance is enhanced by a distinctive triple-bay entry porch with a barrel-vault-top center, and by an open well-house-like belfry. Both the porch and the belfry have stickwork brackets, and the belfry has a gable roof and a central finial. Two entrances lead from the porch into coat rooms, which open onto the main schoolroom. The schoolroom has vertical-board interior paneling and a pressed metal ceiling. A clapboard woodshed with a gable roof is located behind the schoolhouse.
