= Old Mission, Michigan =

- Unincorporated community
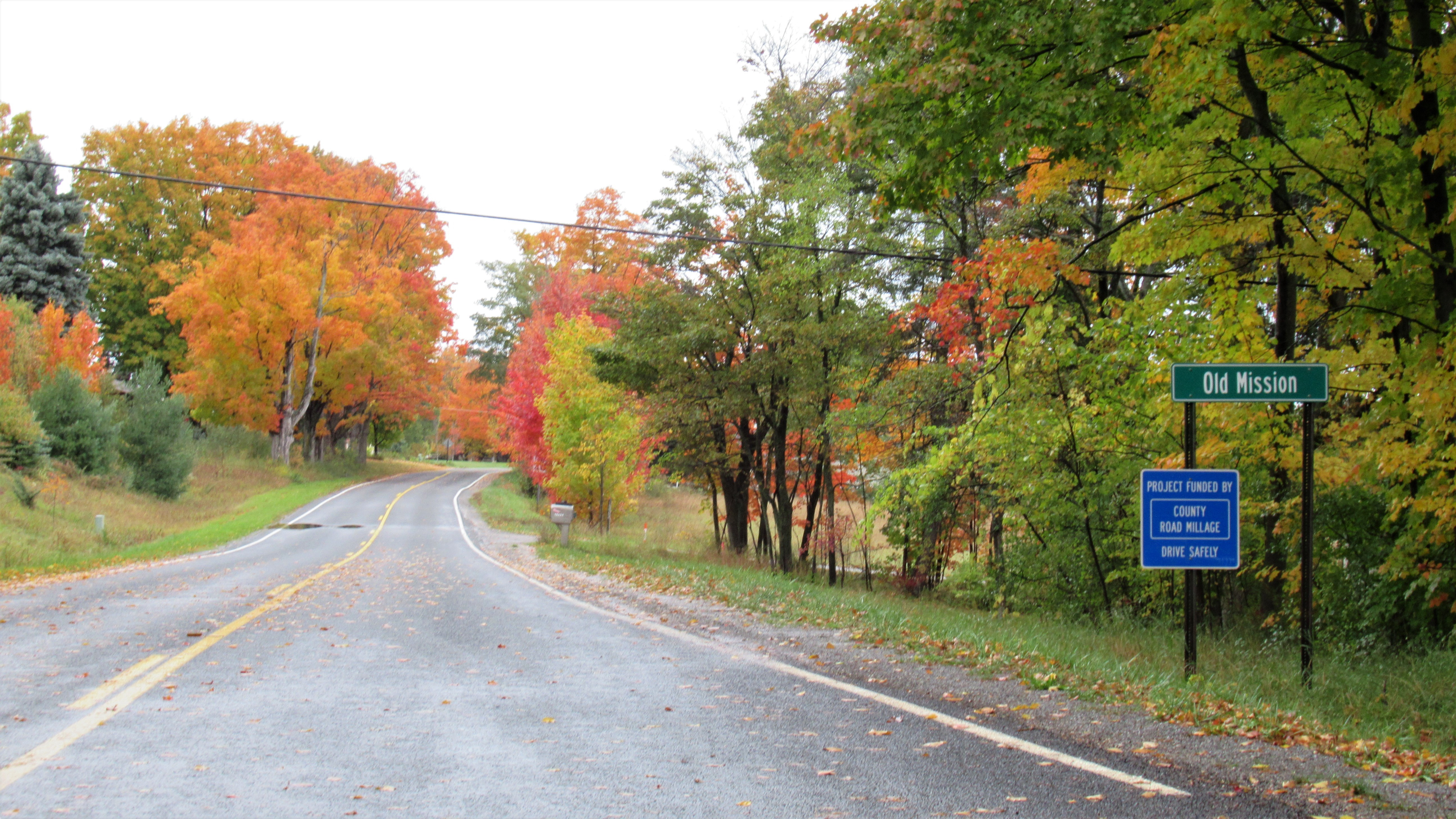
- Road signage along Mission Road

- Location within Michigan Location within the United States
- Coordinates: 44°57′44″N 85°29′07″W
- Country: United States
- State: Michigan
- County: Grand Traverse
- Township: Peninsula
- Settled: 1838
- Elevation: 587 ft (179 m)
- Time zone: UTC-5 (Eastern (EST))
  - Summer (DST): UTC-4 (EDT)
- ZIP code(s): 49673; 49686 (Traverse City)
- Area code: 231
- GNIS feature ID: 634007

Old Mission is an unincorporated community in Grand Traverse County in the U.S. state of Michigan. The community is located within Peninsula Township, and is located about 2 miles (3.2 km) south of the tip of the Old Mission Peninsula, along the shore of the East Arm of Grand Traverse Bay. As an unincorporated community, Old Mission has no legally defined boundaries or population statistics of its own.

Old Mission is one of the oldest communities in Northern Michigan, and is the oldest permanent settlement in the Grand Traverse Bay region, founded in 1839 by Presbyterian missionary Peter Dougherty. The Old Mission Peninsula today is known largely for its cherry crop, which is also attributed to Dougherty.

== History ==
In the Treaty of Washington in 1836, the federal government agreed to provide local native tribes, such as the Ojibwe and Odawa, with both a mission and schools for their reservation. Henry Schoolcraft, the Indian agent representing the government, selected a natural harbor on the eastern shore of the peninsula in Grand Traverse Bay for the planned facilities. In 1838, the Presbyterian Board of Missions, sent the Reverend Peter Dougherty (1805–1894) to establish the mission, doing so in 1839. The settlement became known as Grand Traverse, and was given a post office in 1850. In 1852, Dougherty relocated the mission to the Leelanau County community of Omena, originally established as New Mission. In 1869, the Grand Traverse post office was renamed to Old Mission.

The Dougherty Mission House, also known as the Rushmore House and Inn, was built within the community in 1842. The house and surrounding structures currently serve as a museum. The Old Mission Inn, built is 1887, is also a historic structure within Old Mission. The two are listed on the National Register of Historic Places and as Michigan State Historic Sites.

The area received its first post office on April 26, 1850, under the name Old Mission. The post office remains in operation and is located at 4007 Swaney Road. Currently, the post office uses the 49673 ZIP Code, which is used for post office box only and has no delivery. The area is served by the Traverse City 49686 ZIP Code.

== Geography ==
Old Mission is located just east of M-37 near the tip of Old Mission Peninsula about 16 miles (25.75 km) north of Traverse City. The community was built along Old Mission Harbor, which is a small safe haven along the East Arm of Grand Traverse Bay. The community sits at an elevation of 587 feet (179 m) above sea level.

The community is located within an American Viticultural Area and a center of the Michigan wine industry, including the Old Mission Peninsula AVA. Mission Point Light is located slightly north at the northern terminus of M-37. The 45th parallel is slightly north of Old Mission.

=== Climate ===
Climate data for Old Mission 3 SSW, Michigan (1991–2020 normals, extremes 1979–present)
Month	Jan	Feb	Mar	Apr	May	Jun	Jul	Aug	Sep	Oct	Nov	Dec	Year
Record high °F (°C)	54 (12)	65 (18)	84 (29)	85 (29)	92 (33)	95 (35)	97 (36)	99 (37)	92 (33)	87 (31)	76 (24)	65 (18)	99 (37)
Mean daily maximum °F (°C)	29.5 (−1.4)	30.8 (−0.7)	40.6 (4.8)	52.3 (11.3)	65.6 (18.7)	75.5 (24.2)	79.9 (26.6)	78.6 (25.9)	71.4 (21.9)	57.8 (14.3)	46.1 (7.8)	35.2 (1.8)	55.3 (12.9)
Daily mean °F (°C)	23.0 (−5.0)	23.4 (−4.8)	31.4 (−0.3)	41.8 (5.4)	54.1 (12.3)	63.9 (17.7)	68.8 (20.4)	68.3 (20.2)	61.2 (16.2)	49.5 (9.7)	39.3 (4.1)	29.9 (−1.2)	46.2 (7.9)
Mean daily minimum °F (°C)	16.5 (−8.6)	15.9 (−8.9)	22.2 (−5.4)	31.3 (−0.4)	42.6 (5.9)	52.4 (11.3)	57.7 (14.3)	58.1 (14.5)	50.9 (10.5)	41.3 (5.2)	32.5 (0.3)	24.5 (−4.2)	37.2 (2.9)
Record low °F (°C)	−14 (−26)	−20 (−29)	−16 (−27)	8 (−13)	23 (−5)	31 (−1)	36 (2)	34 (1)	27 (−3)	21 (−6)	13 (−11)	−5 (−21)	−20 (−29)
Average precipitation inches (mm)	1.78 (45)	1.18 (30)	1.43 (36)	2.81 (71)	3.05 (77)	3.02 (77)	2.78 (71)	3.32 (84)	3.61 (92)	3.98 (101)	2.36 (60)	2.00 (51)	31.32 (796)
Source: NOAA

== Education ==
The area is served by Traverse City Area Public Schools, with high school students in Old Mission zoned to Traverse City Central High School. There are no public schools located on Old Mission Peninsula.

== Images ==
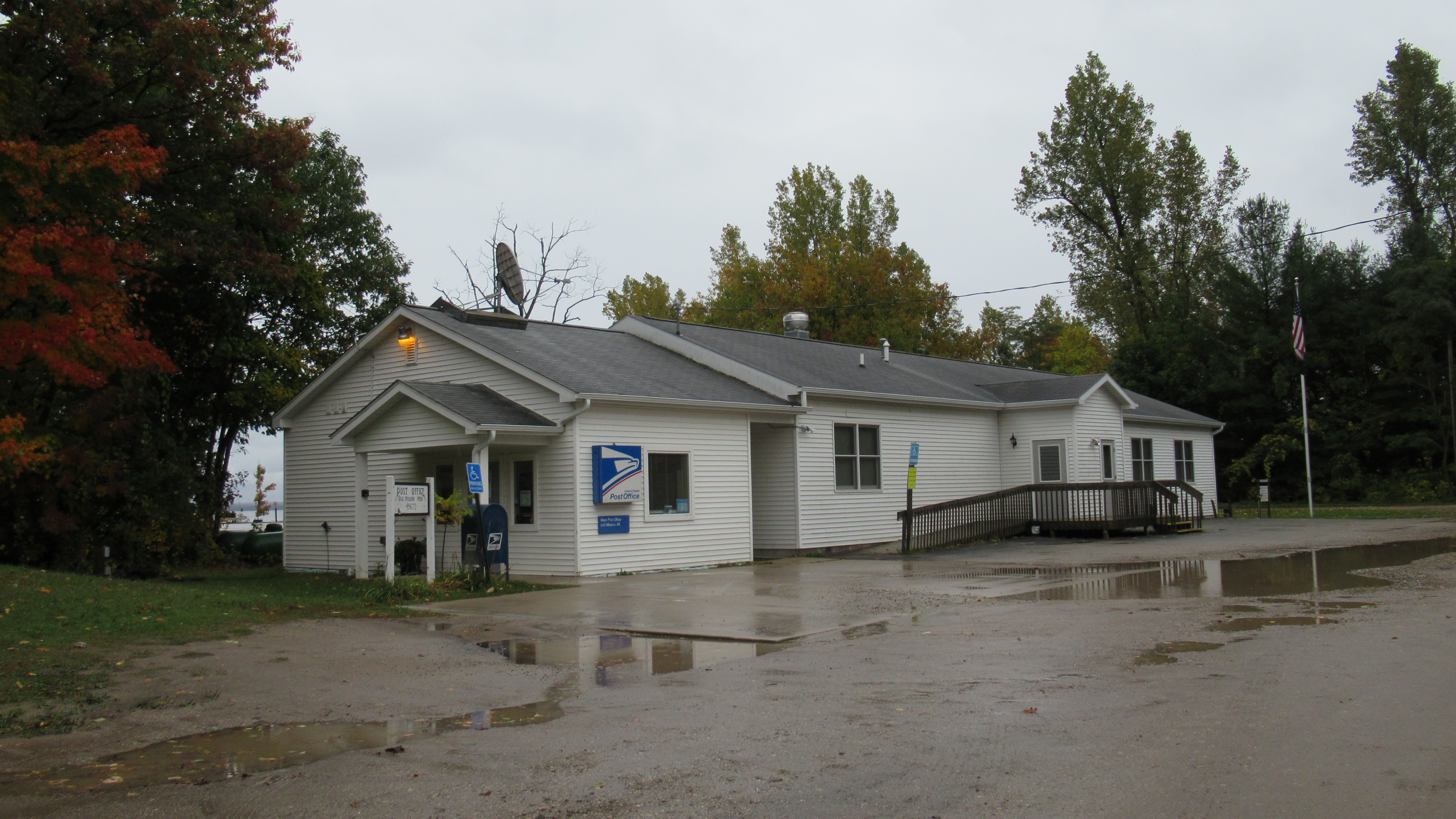
U.S. Post Office in Old Mission

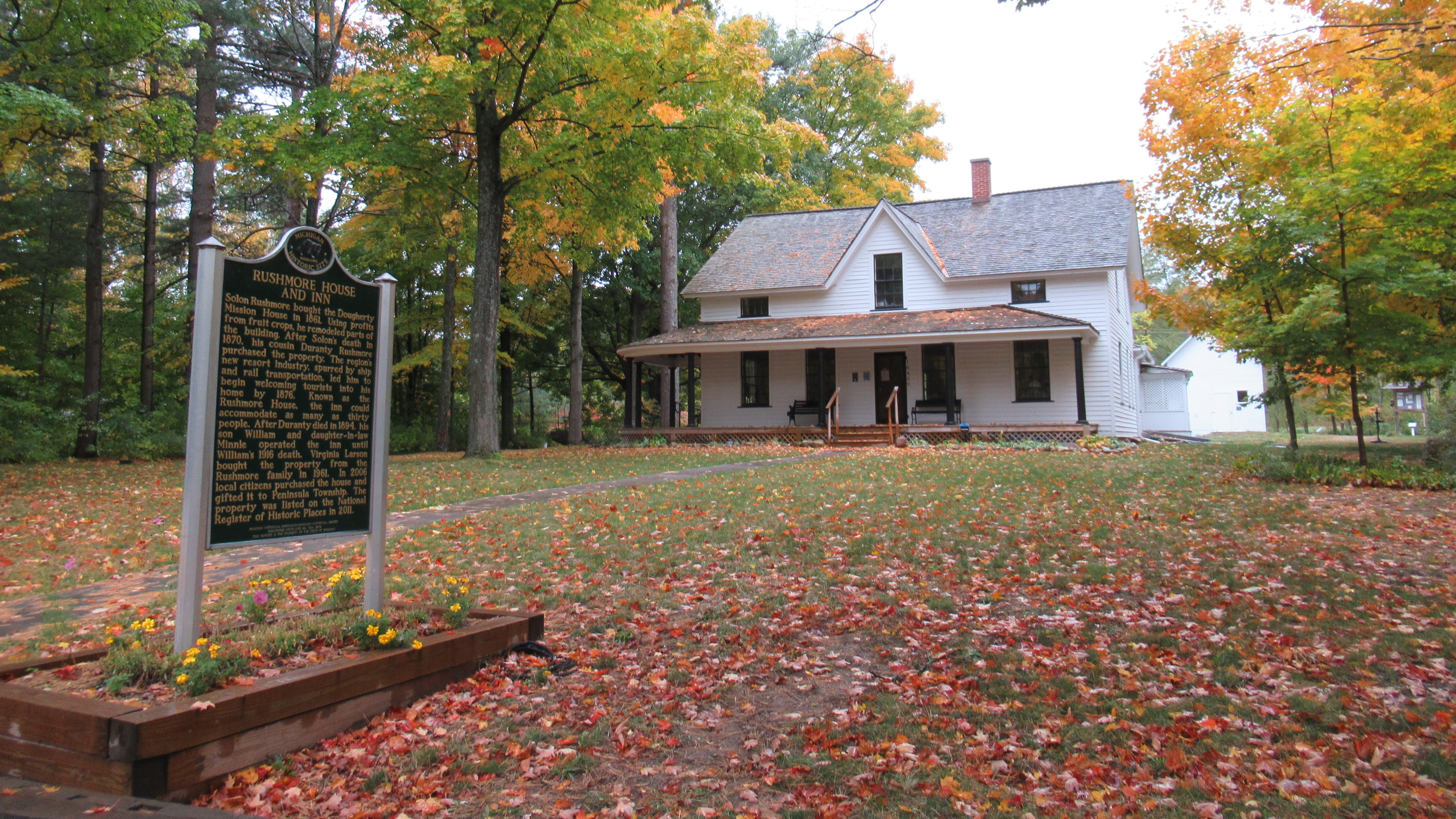
Dougherty Mission House, also known as the Rushmore House and Inn

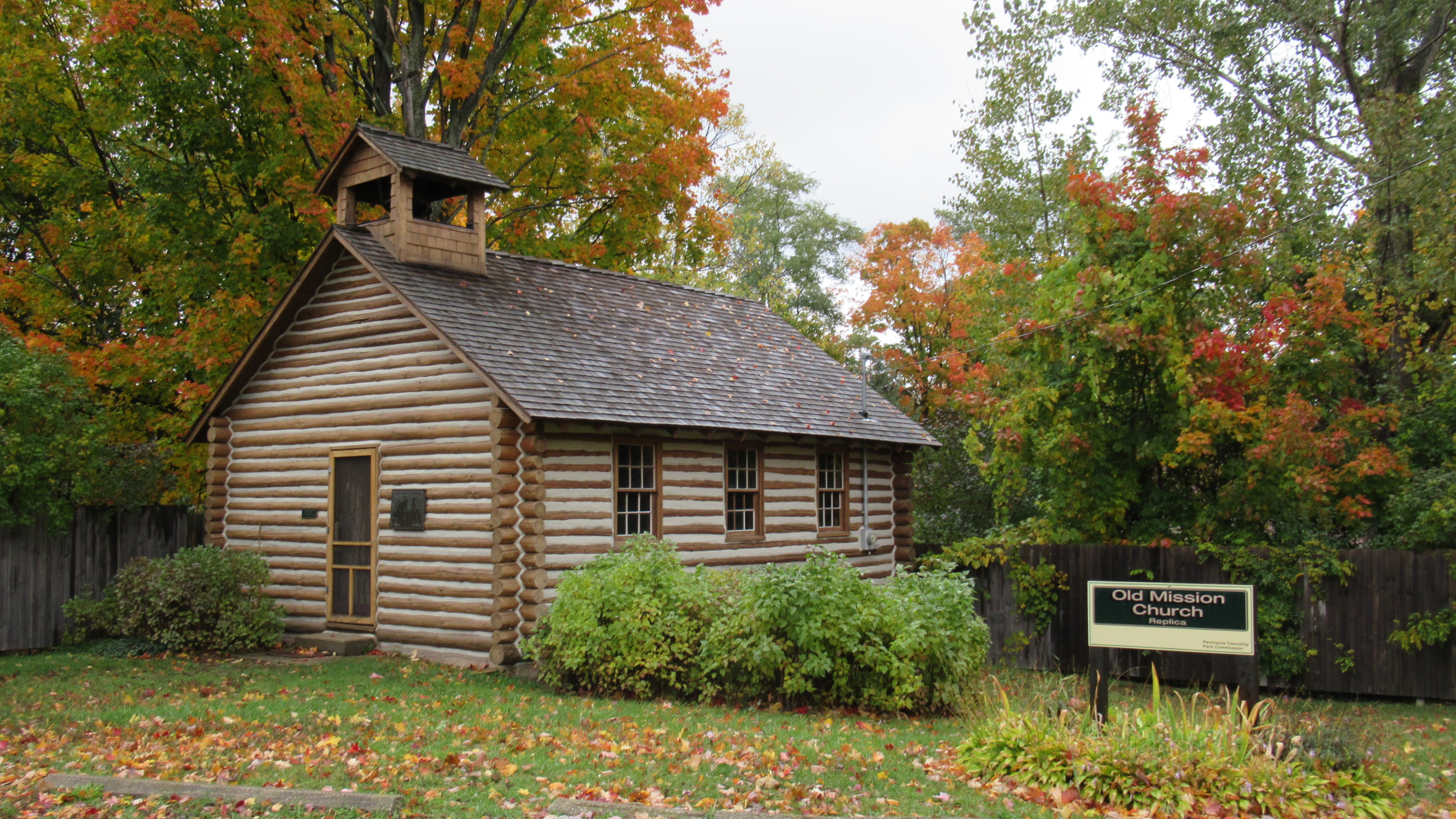
Replica of an Old Mission Church

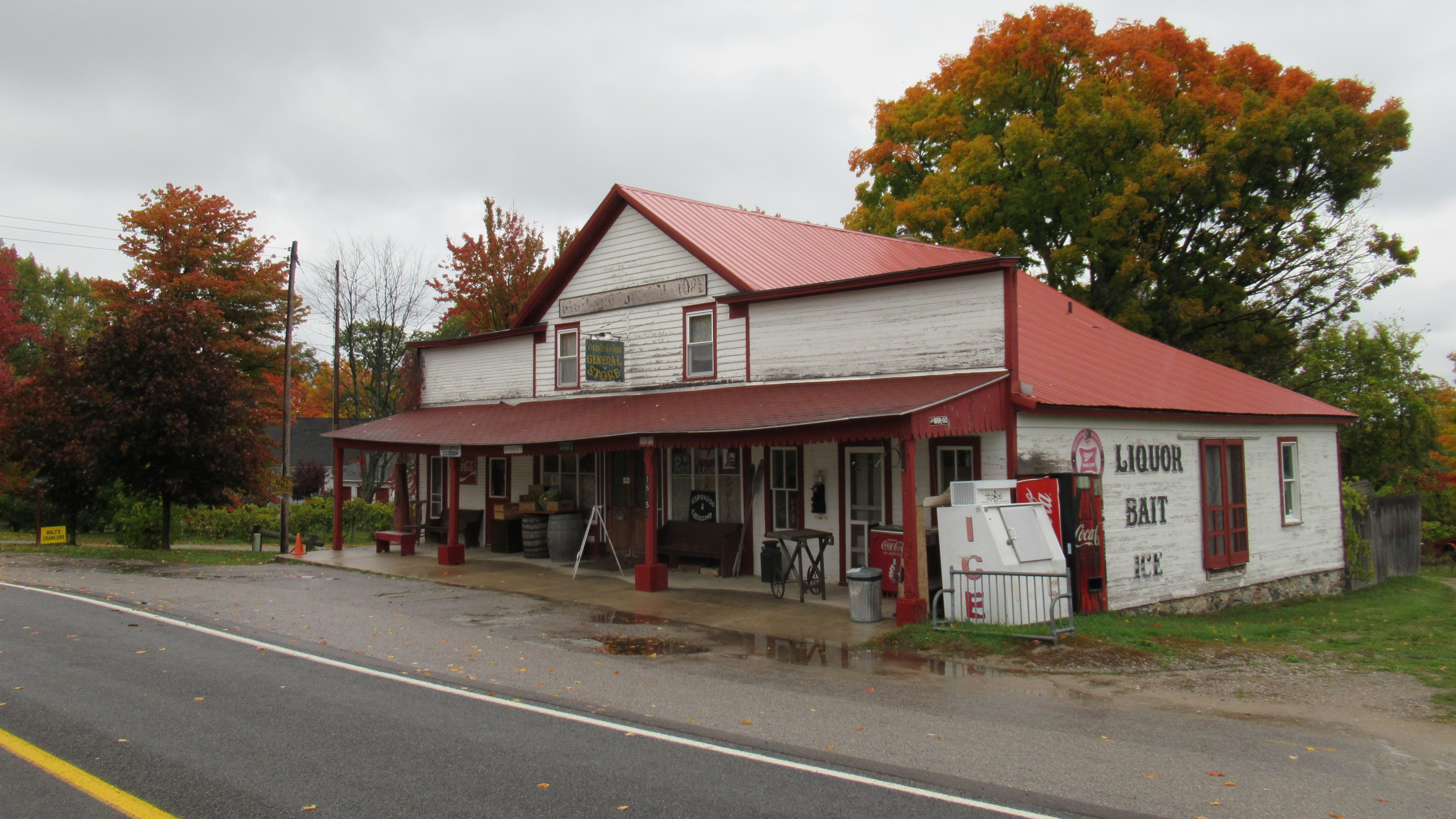
Old Mission General Store

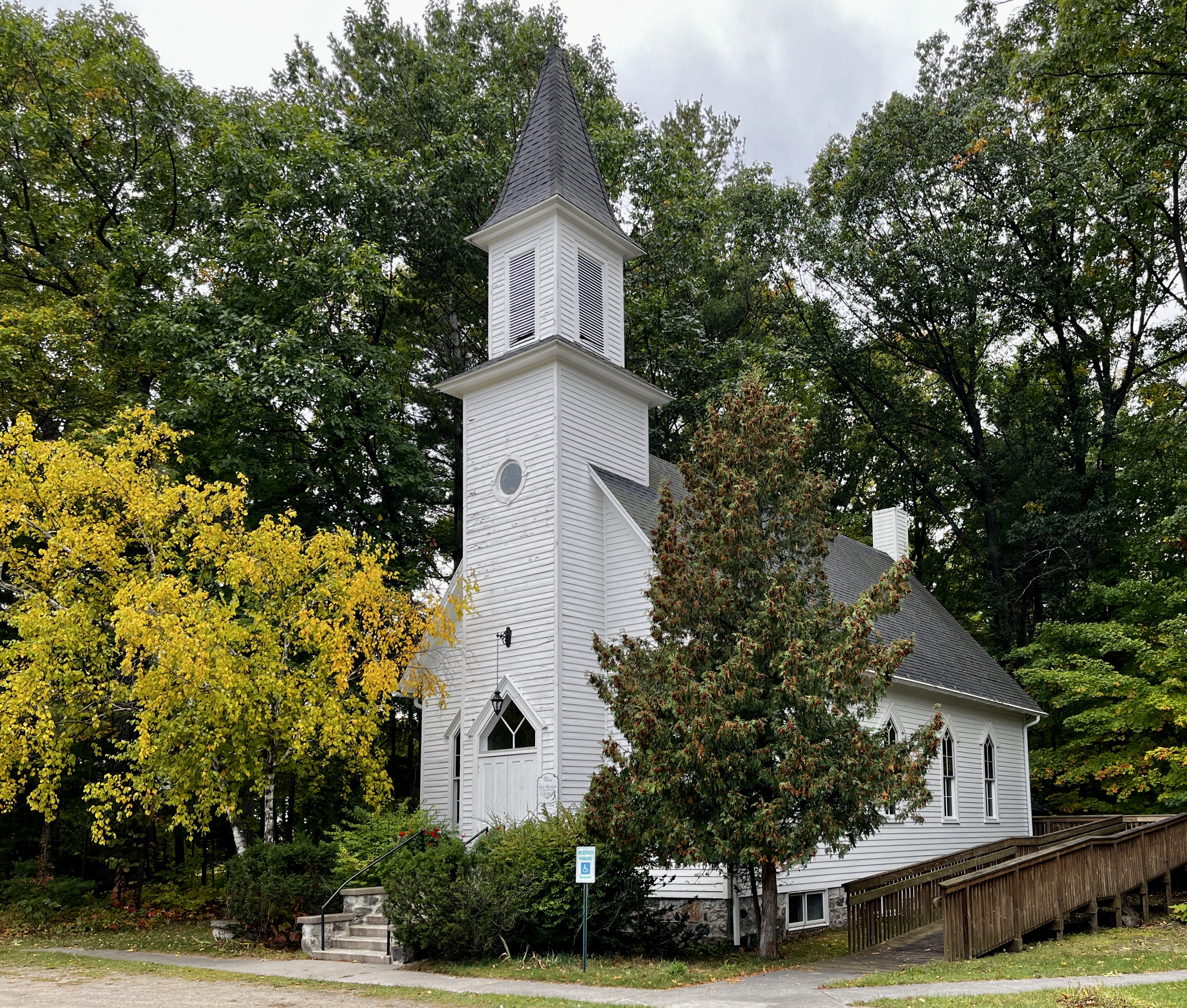
Old Mission Congregational Church
