= Dougherty Mission House =

Historic house in Michigan, United States

- U.S. National Register of Historic Places
- Michigan State Historic Site
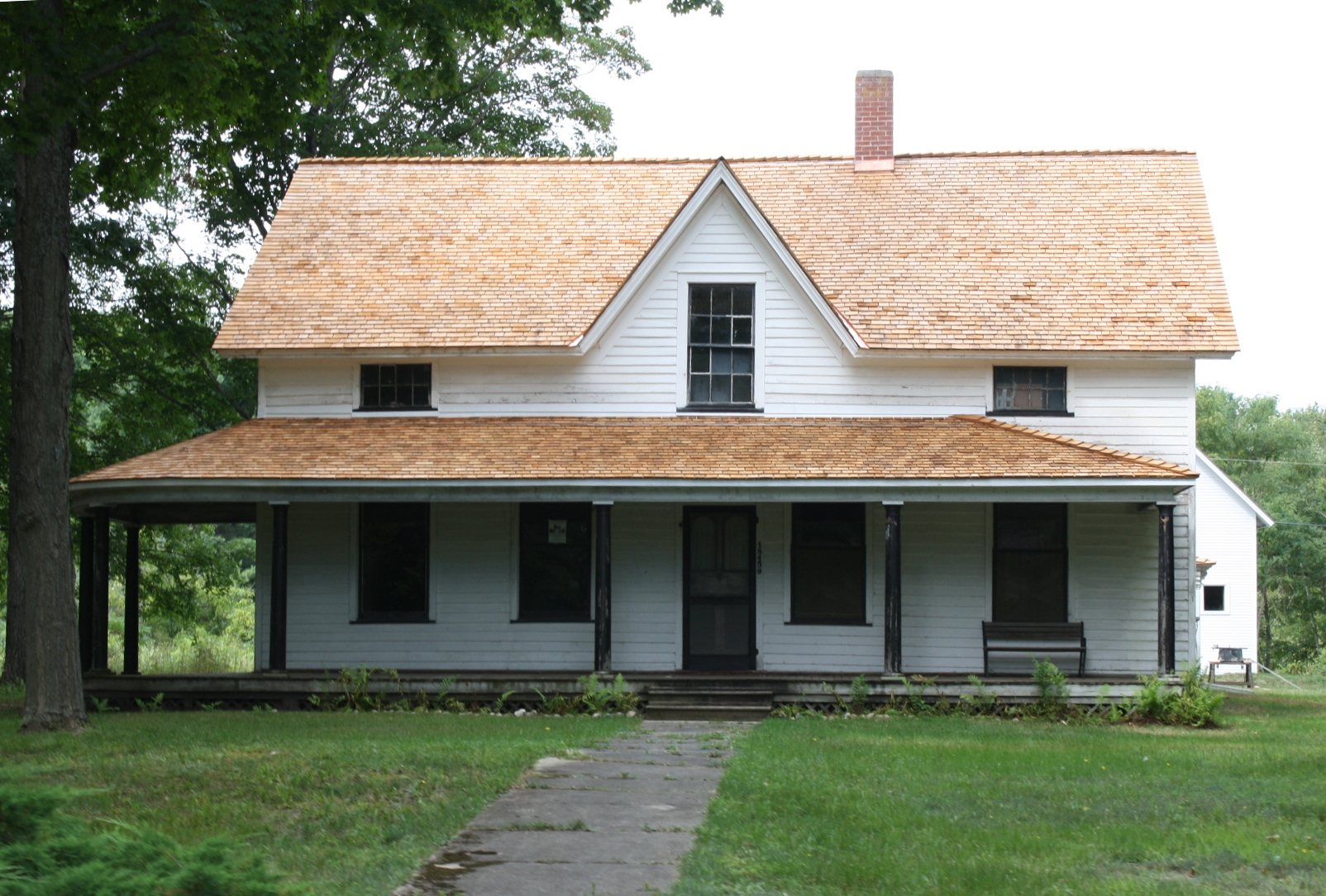

- Location within Michigan Location within the United States
- Interactive map of Dougherty Mission House
- Location: 18459 Mission Road, Peninsula Township, Michigan
- Coordinates: 44°57′25″N 85°29′26″W
- Area: 1 acre (0.40 ha)
- Built: 1842
- NRHP reference No.: 11000176

Significant dates
- Added to NRHP: April 8, 2011
- Designated MSHS: February 18, 1956

The Dougherty Mission House is a house located at 18459 Mission Road in Peninsula Township, Michigan. It was designated a Michigan State Historic Site in 1956 and listed on the National Register of Historic Places in 2011. The house was certainly one of the first frame buildings constructed in Grand Traverse County, and is thought to be the first post and beam house constructed in Michigan's lower peninsula north of Grand Rapids.

== History ==
In 1839, the Presbyterian Board of Missions sent Reverend Peter Dougherty to the Grand Traverse area. He originally chose a site at what is now Elk Rapids, Michigan, and constructed a log church there. However, in May 1839, Chief Ahgosa of the Grand Traverse Band of Ottawa and Chippewa Indians, asked Dougherty to move to what is now Old Mission, Michigan. There, Dougherty established a small settlement, moving the mission church from the Elk Rapids site and adding a school and cabins. In 1840, Dougherty married Maria Higgins of Princeton, New Jersey, and the couple returned to Michigan to live at the Old Mission site. Peter and Maria Dougherty eventually had nine children born in Michigan

In 1842, Dougherty realized he needed a more permanent residence for his family, and constructed the house that is currently on this site. The house was certainly one of the first frame buildings constructed in Grand Traverse County, and is thought to be the first post and beam house constructed in Michigan's lower peninsula north of Grand Rapids.

By 1850, the village around the mission included 40 log homes, in addition to the church and school. However, in that same year, the treaty with the Native Americans was renegotiated, resulting in the local populace purchasing land across the bay near what is now Omena, Michigan. In 1852, Dougherty moved his mission across the bay to Omena, establishing a "New Mission" at the site. The house at the old mission remained standing, unused, until 1861, when Dougherty sold it to Solon Rushmore. Rushmore farmed the surrounding land until his death in 1870. His cousin Duranty Rushmore then purchased the property. Duranty Rushmore continued farming, but soon realized that he could capitalize on the new tourist market opening in the area. He turned Dougherty's mission house into an inn, called the "Rushmore House." The Rushmores at some point in the late 19th century added the rear kitchen addition to the house, and added the front wraparound porch near the turn of the century.

Duranty Rushmore died in 1894, passing the property along to his son William, who with his wife Minnie continued to farm and run the inn. However, on William's death in 1916, the property passed to his son Maurice who lived in New Jersey, and although Minnie Rushmore continued to summer there, it was apparently no longer used as an inn. The house stayed in the hands of the Rushmore family for nearly 100 years. At some point, a replica of the original 1839 mission church was built nearby, and in 1956, the home and mission were placed on the Michigan Historic Sites Register.

In 1961, Maurice Rushmore sold the Dougherty house to Virginia Larson, who lived nearby at the time. Larson used the house for storage, but with the intention of eventually turning it into a museum. After her death in 2004, her heirs, David and Dan Larson, granted an option to purchase the home and its 15 surrounding acres to the Grand Traverse Regional Land Conservancy. In 2006, the house was purchased by Peninsula Township, and restoration work began. Nearby structures, such as the Rushmore-era ice house and outhouse, were restored, and the roof was replaced. As of 2014, it is administered by the Peter Dougherty Society.

== Description ==
The Dougherty Mission House is a two-story symmetrical frame structure on a fieldstone foundation with a side-gable roof and centered front gable. The sides are clad with clapboard siding and the roof with cedar shingles. There are attached porches on three sides of the house, and a kitchen addition at the rear that was likely added in the late 19th century. The front facade has a full-width porch with a center entrance. Four windows line the first floor around the entrance, placed nearly regularly, save for one offset window. The second floor has a center sash window located in the gable, flanked by two smaller eyebrow windows.

One side of the house has six windows in the main section: three on the first floor, two on the second, and one in the attic. The other side lacks the attic window. There are additional windows in the rear and in the kitchen addition.

The interior of the house contains 1160 square feet of space on each floor, plus an additional 370 square feet in the kitchen addition. The first floor contains eight rooms: a front entryway, parlor, and master bedroom, plus a second bedroom, two smaller rooms, a small bathroom, and the kitchen in the rear. A stairway leads to the second floor, where six bedrooms open off a central hall.

Also on the grounds are an original detached kitchen, an outhouse, and an ice house. The nearby replica mission church is a single-room front-gable log building.

== Gallery ==
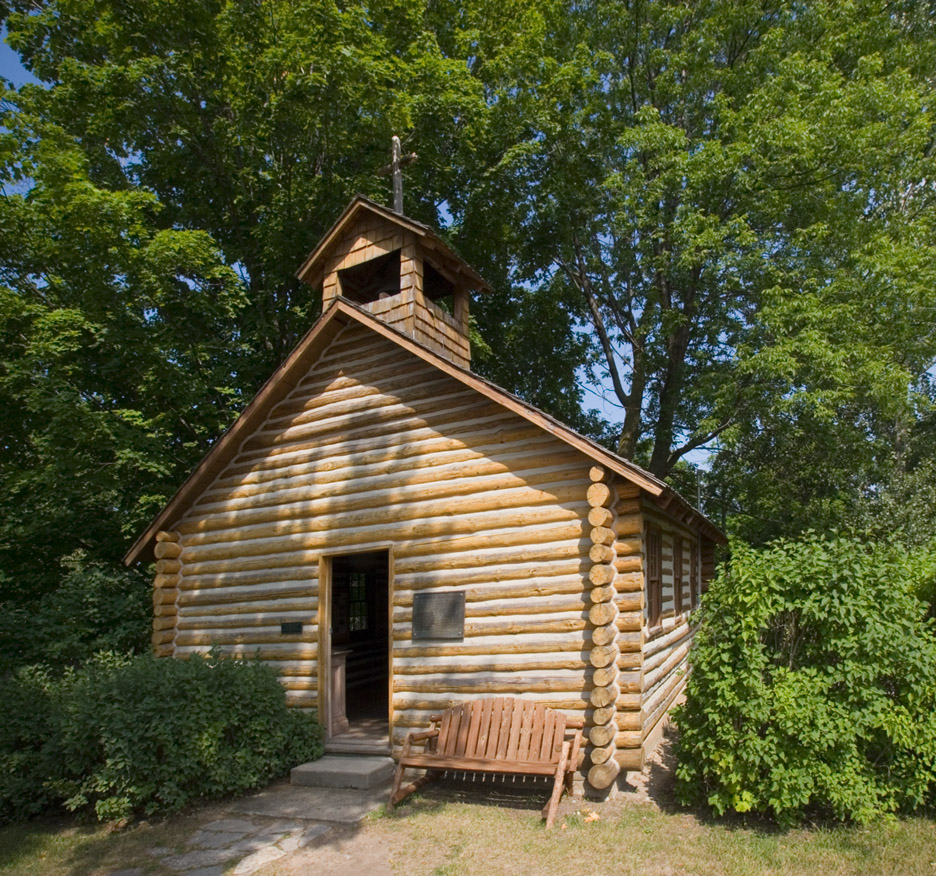
The replica of the Old Mission log church

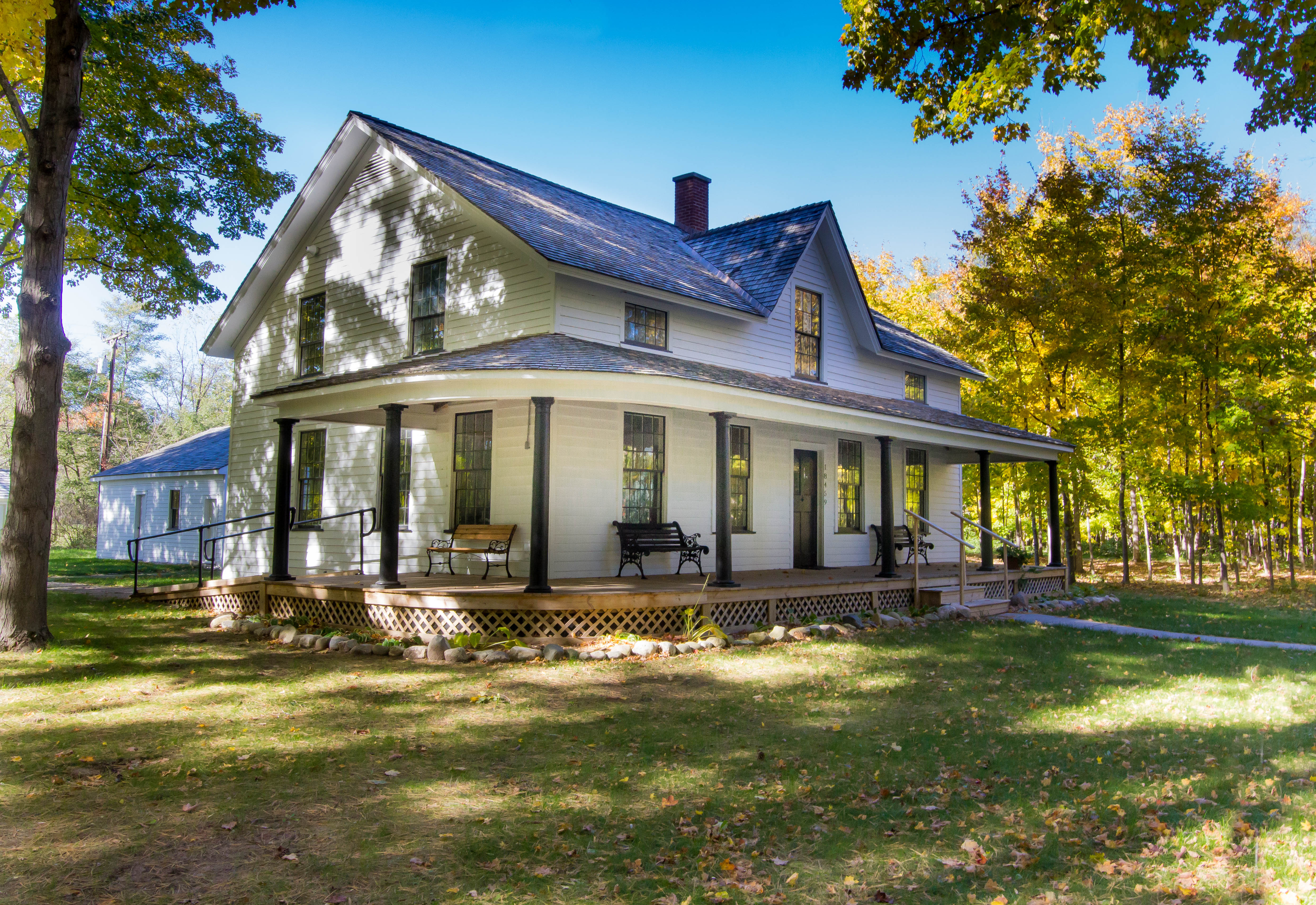
Dougherty Mission and Inn facing NW

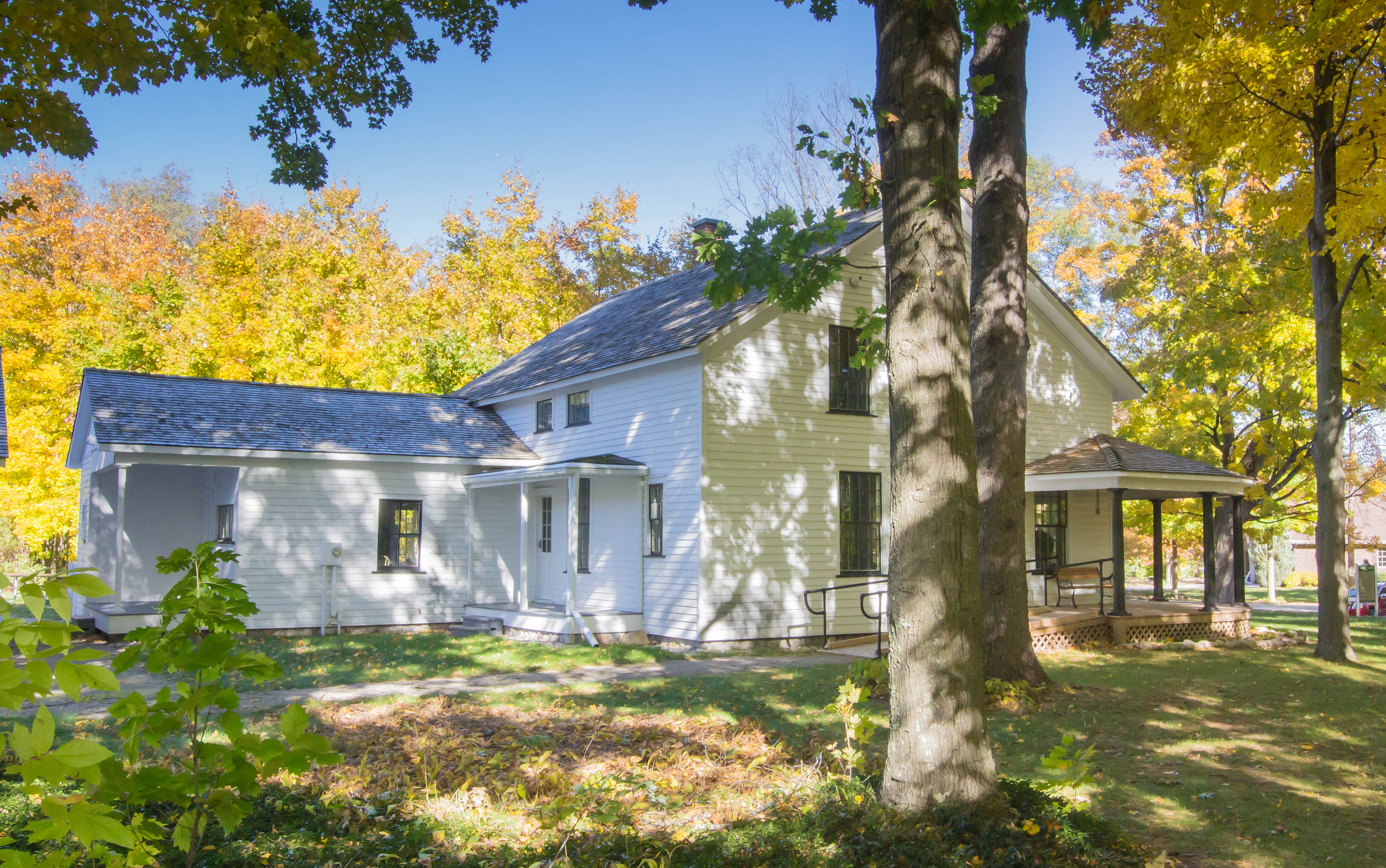
Dougherty Mission facing NE

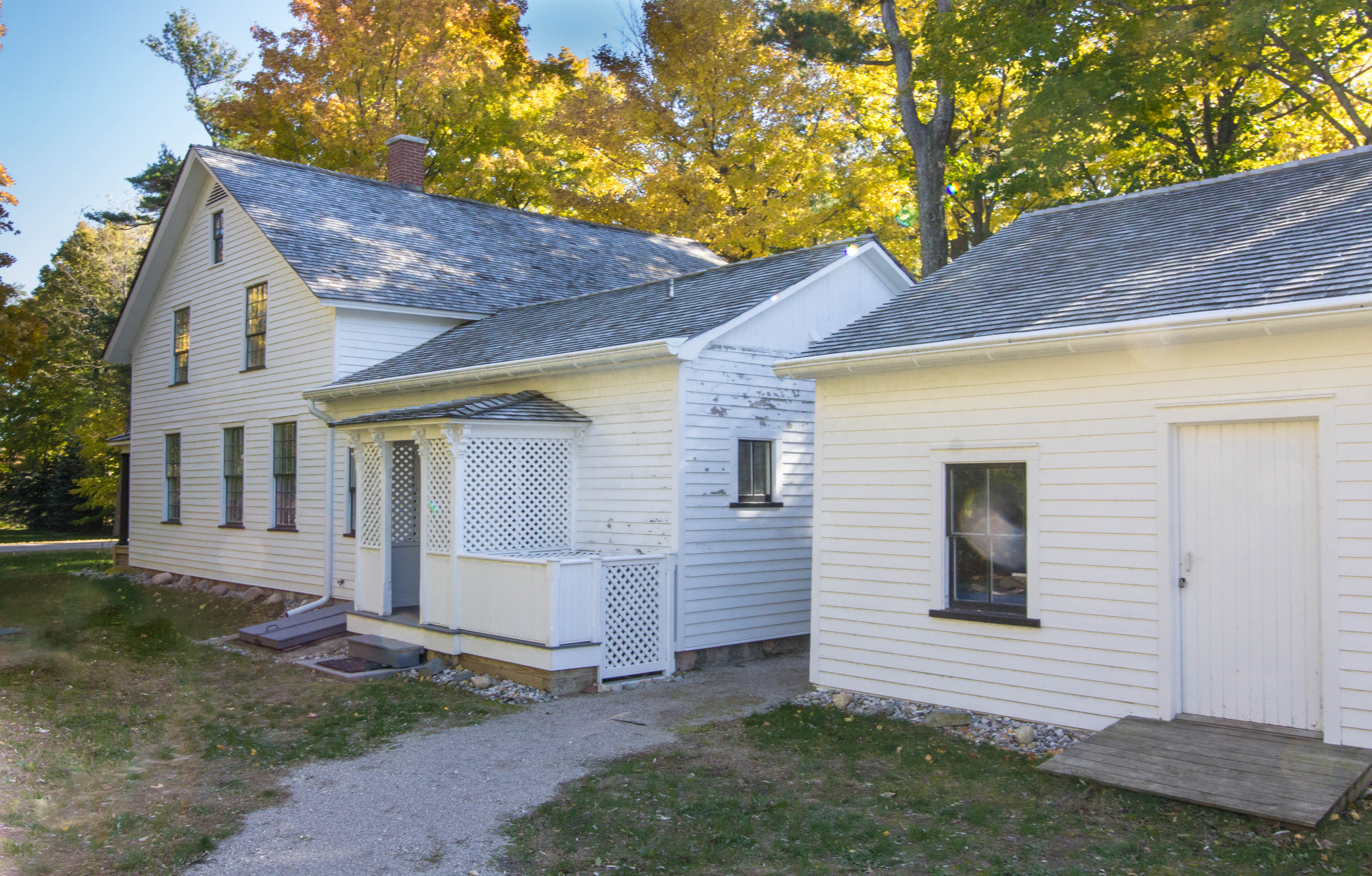
Dougherty Mission facing SE

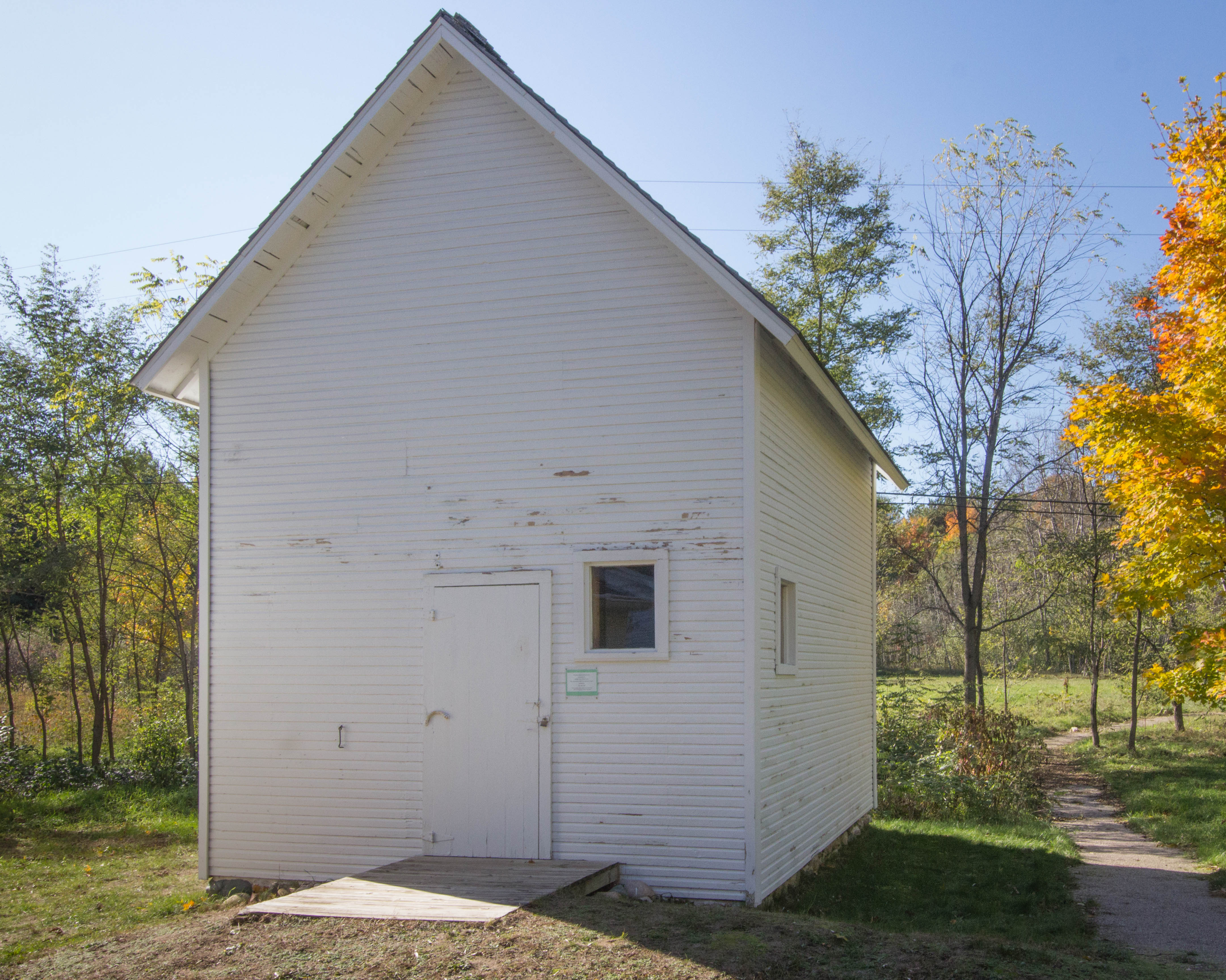
Dougherty Mission Workshop

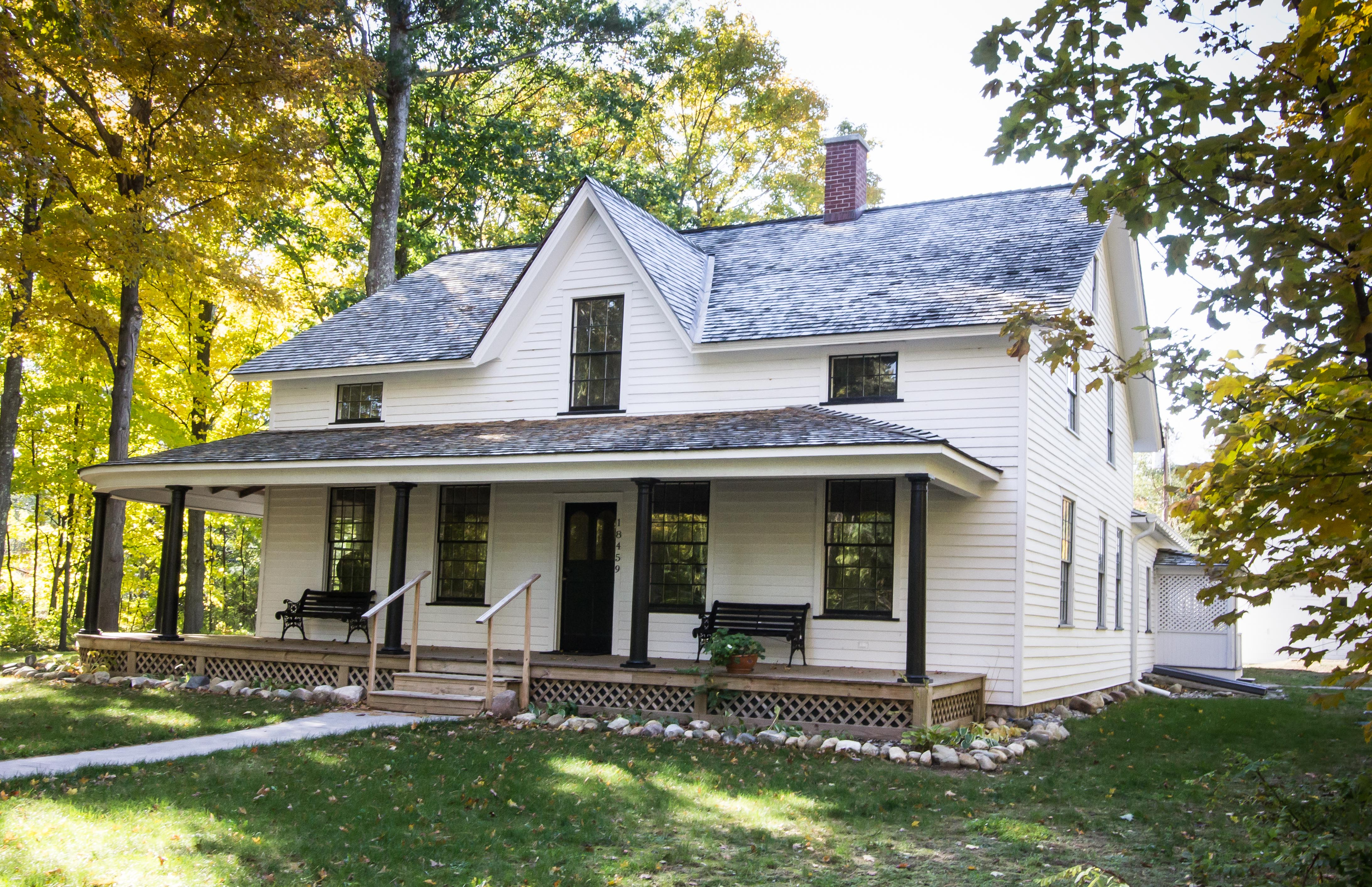
Dougherty Mission facing SW

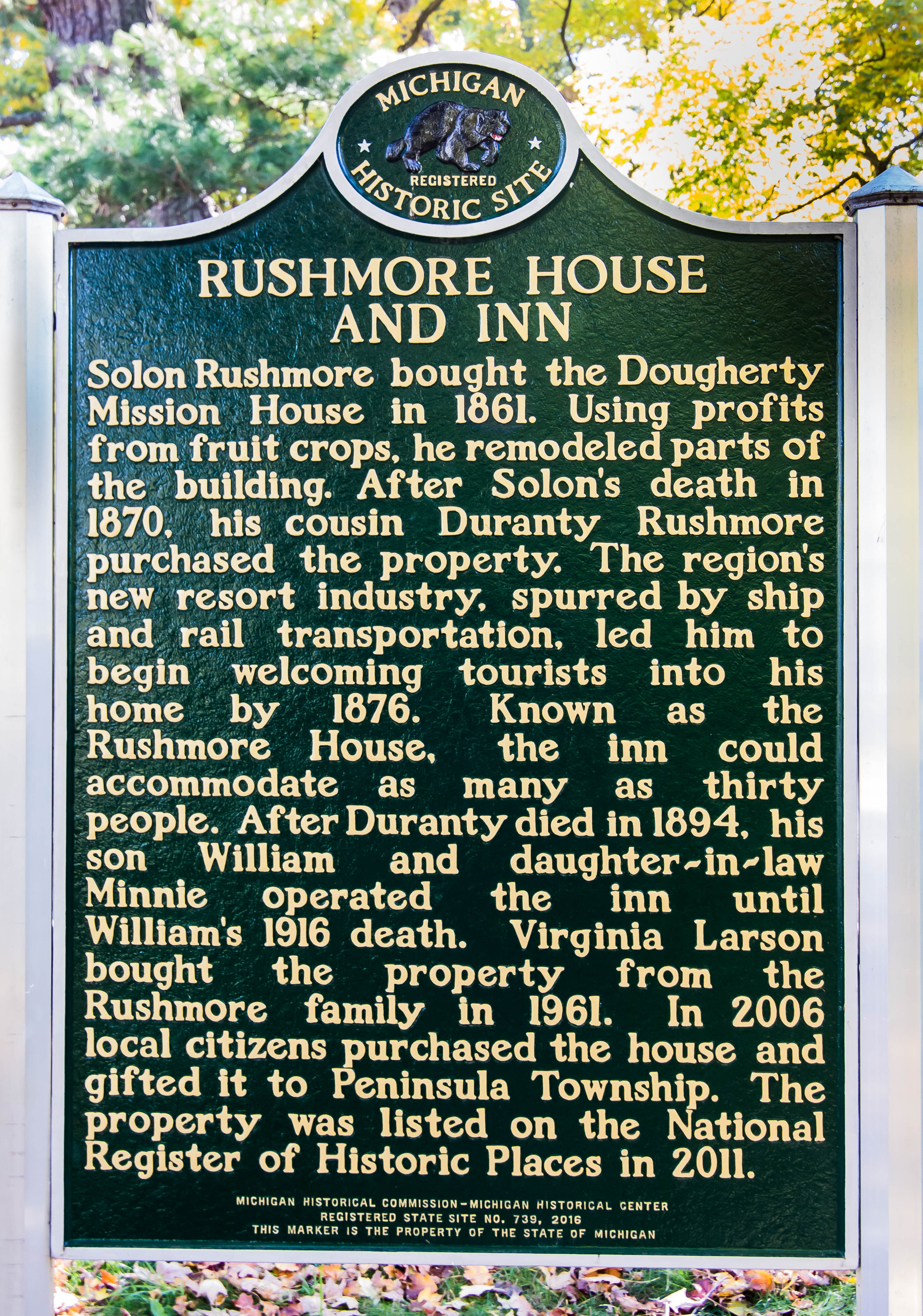
Dougherty Mission Historic Site
