= Old Mission Inn =

United States historic place

- Hedden Hall
- U.S. National Register of Historic Places
- Michigan State Historic Site
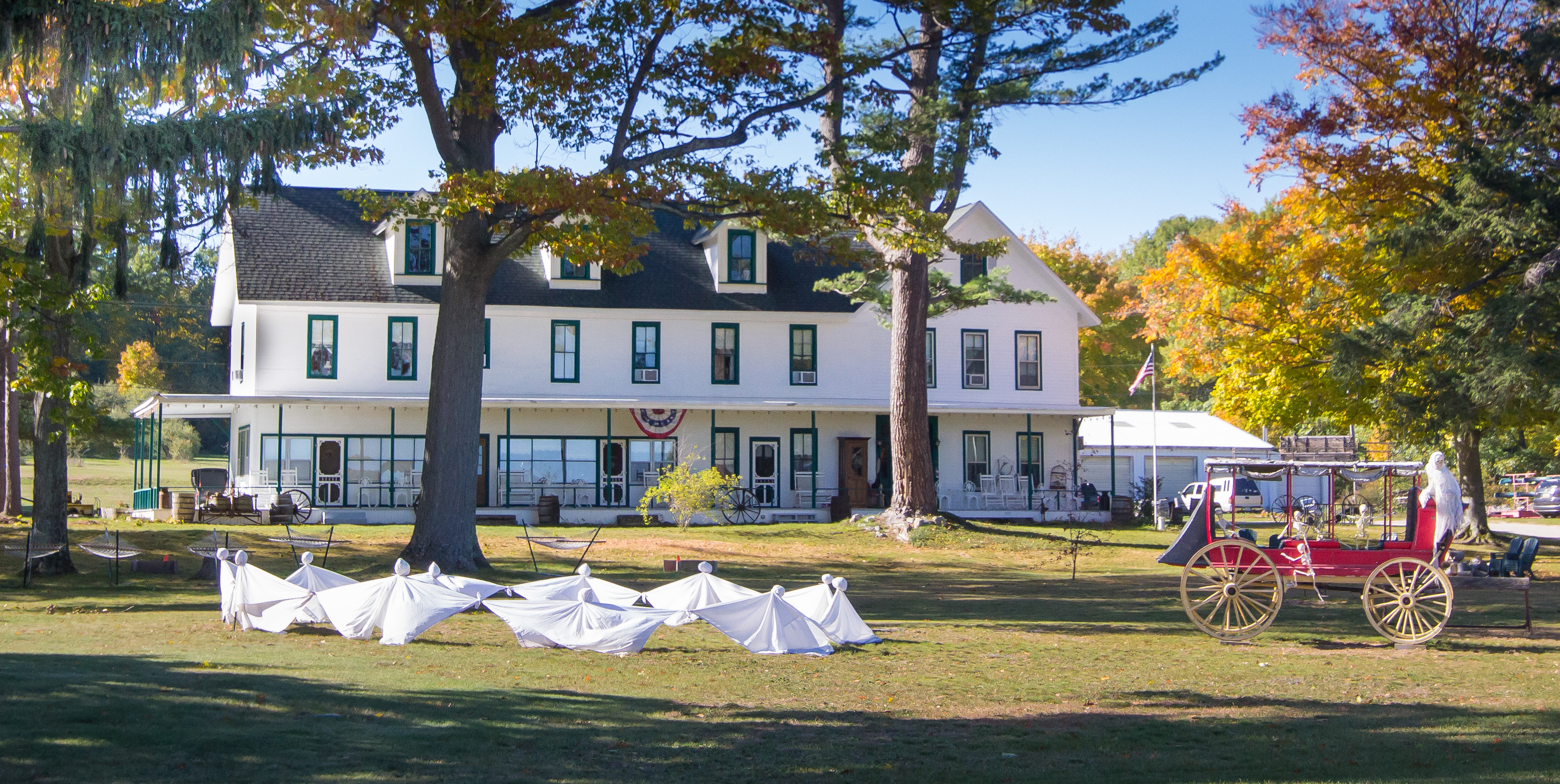

- Location within Michigan Location within the United States
- Interactive map
- Location: 18599 Old Mission Road, Traverse City, Michigan
- Coordinates: 44°57′33″N 85°29′30″W
- Area: 18 acres (7.3 ha)
- Built: 1874
- NRHP reference No.: 82002834

Significant dates
- Added to NRHP: April 15, 1982
- Designated MSHS: February 27, 1980

The Old Mission Inn, previously known as Hedden Hall or the Porter Hotel, is an inn located at 18599 Old Mission Road near Traverse City, Michigan. It was designated a Michigan State Historic Site in 1980 and listed on the National Register of Historic Places in 1982.

== History ==
In 1867, George and Amanda Hedden purchased 37 acres (15 ha) of land that had previously been part of the nearby Old Mission, which had been abandoned in 1852. The Heddens constructed this 25-room inn on the property in 1874, and operated it as "Heddon Hall." In the 1880s, the railroad and steamship lines service in the area began promoting the Grand Traverse region as a summer tourist destination, and the Old Mission Inn was recognized as one of the best hotels in the area. In 1890, the Heddens added a section onto the inn.

The Heddens continued to run the inn until Amanda Hedden's death in 1900. In 1902, George Hedden sold the inn to Alfred and Ella Porter, who changed the name to the "Porter Hotel" and managed the property for 40 years. It was sold again in 1945 to Norman and Doris Nevinger, who named it the "Old Mission Inn." The Nevingers ran the property until 1998, when they sold it to the Jensen family. It continues to be used as a historic inn.

== Description ==
The Old Mission Inn is a 2 1/2-story L-shaped frame structure sided with clapboards, sitting on a cobblestone foundation, and covered with a shingled gable roof. The front features a wide open veranda and overhanging eaves supported by triangular brackets. Gabled dormers project from the roof.

== Images ==
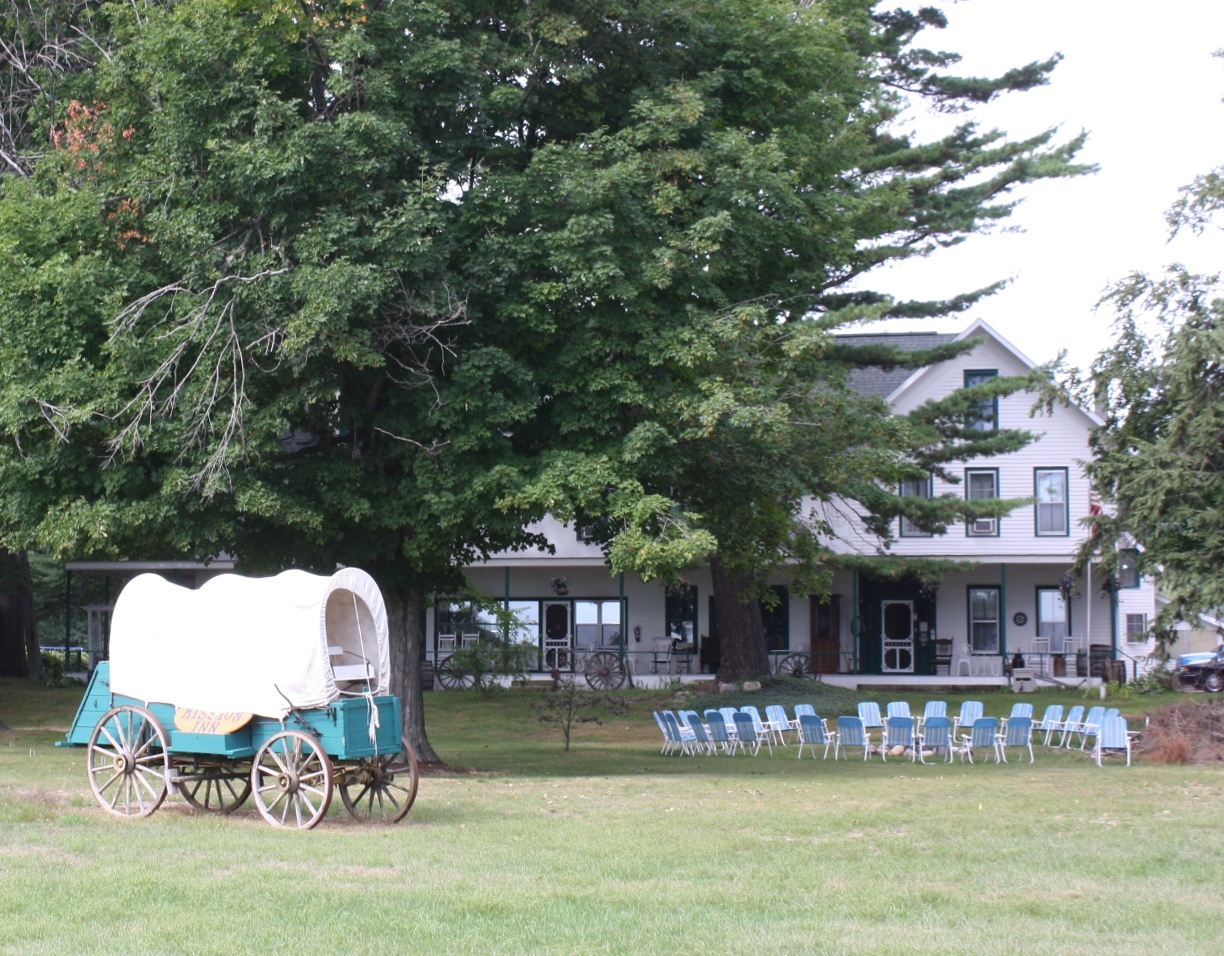

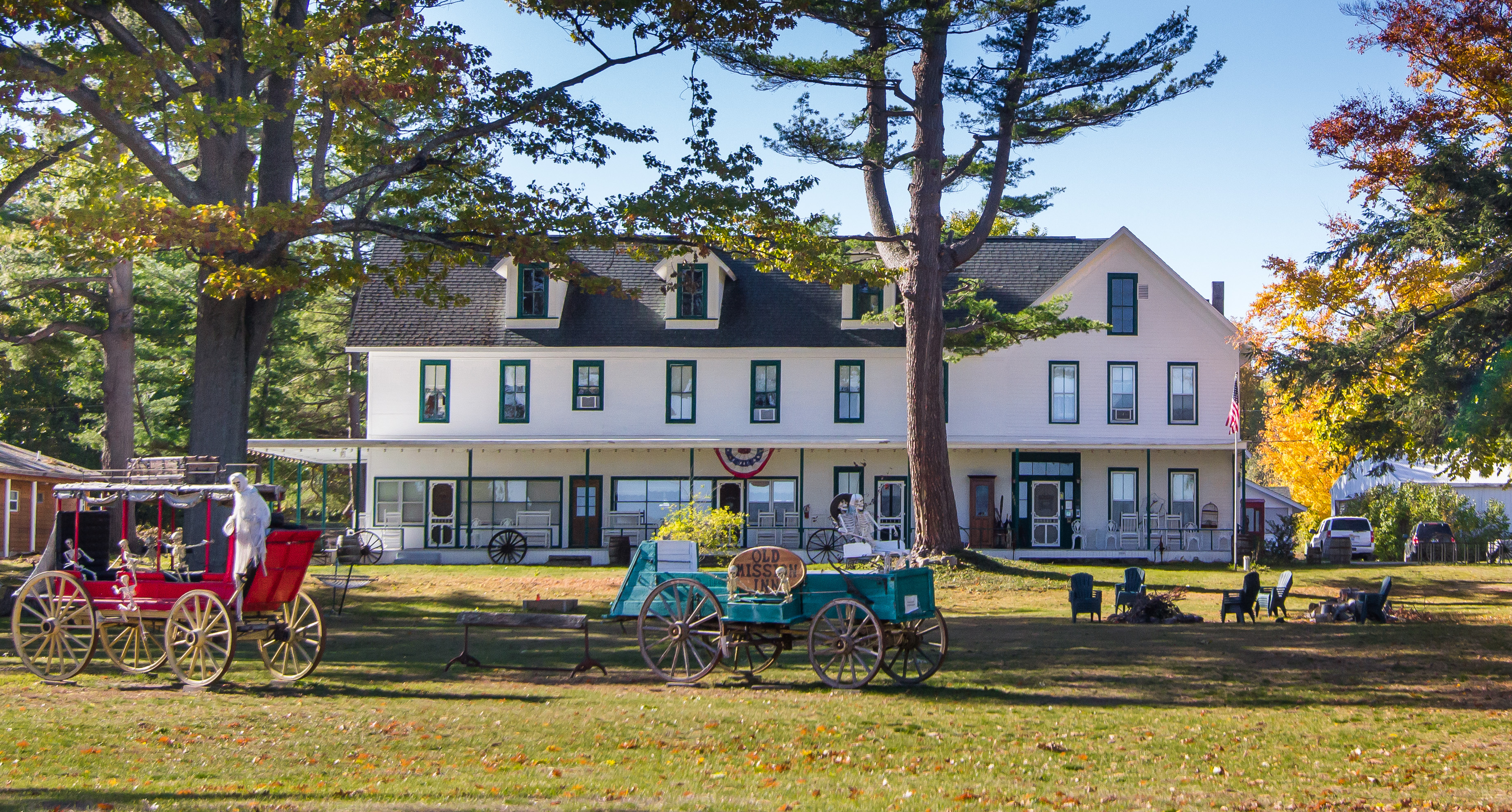
