= Omena Historic District =

Historic district in Michigan, United States

- U.S. National Register of Historic Places
- U.S. Historic district
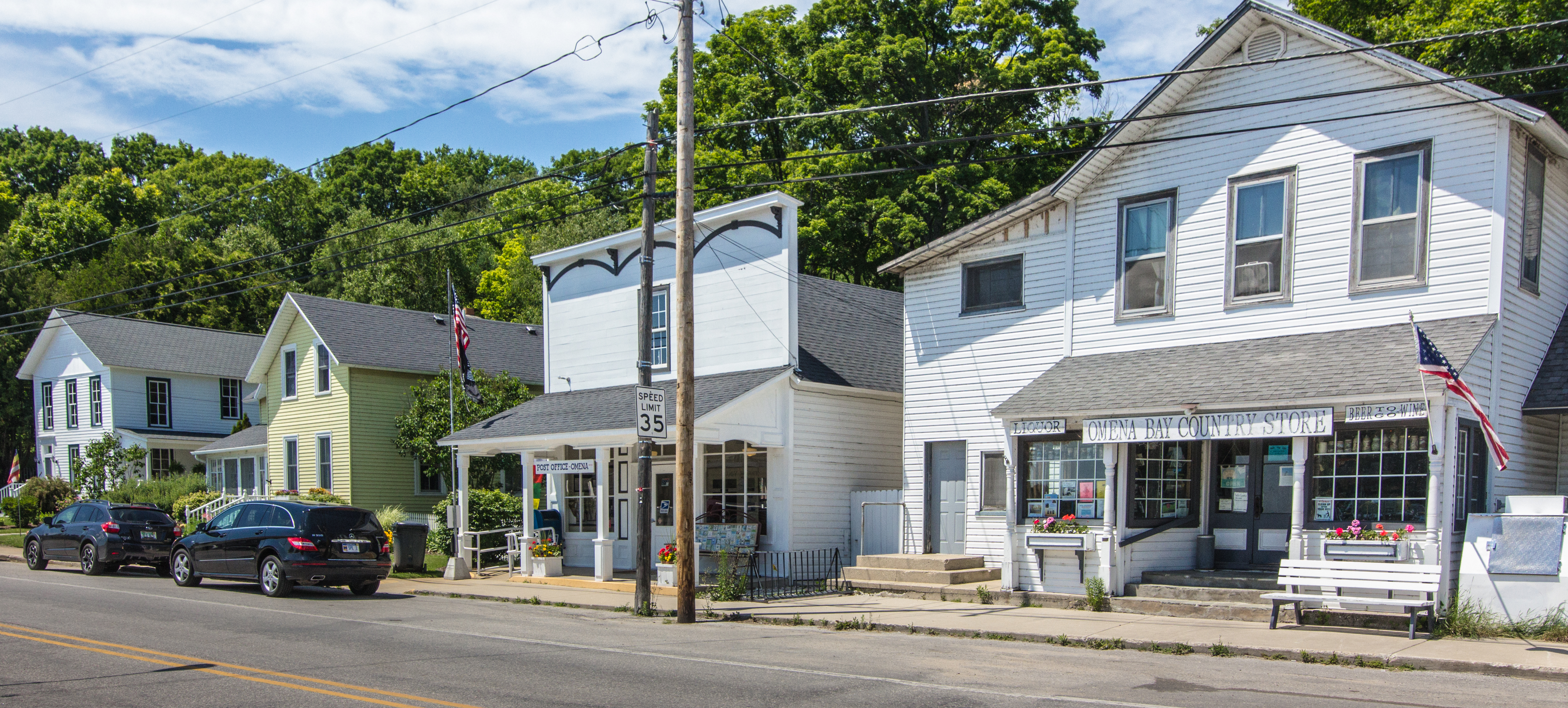

- Location within Michigan Location within the United States
- Interactive map
- Location: Generally along M-22 from Tatch Road to North Omena Point Road, Omena, Michigan
- Coordinates: 45°3′22″N 85°35′14″W
- Built: 1855
- Architectural style: Upright and Wing, Gablefront, Greek Revival, Italianate, Queen Anne, False front commercial
- NRHP reference No.: 100000534
- Added to NRHP: January 17, 2017

The Omena Historic District is a historic district located along M-22 from Tatch Road to North Omena Point Road in Omena, Michigan. It was listed on the National Register of Historic Places in 2017.

== History ==
Omena was founded in 1851 by the Rev. Peter Dougherty as a Presbyterian mission school serving the local Chippewa band. The school itself was located about a mile est of the present-day Omena. European settlers were slowly moving to the area, and when construction of the school was completed in 1853, Dougherty began planning for a church located in what is now Omena, for use by all people in the area. A graveyard was started in 1855, and in 1858 the church was built. Dougherty's house was built about the same time. Dougherty was assisted in his mission by Peter Greensky, a native leader and Methodist preacher. Greensky owned what is now the Cherry Basket farm for several years until 1859, when he left Omena.

The years during and after the Civil War were difficult for Peter Dougherty and his family, and funding for the school declined. Dougherty decided to leave Omena in 1871. In the meantime, the nearby harbor became more developed. As more European settlers arrived in the area in the 1880s, agriculture became the dominant industry around Omena, with products shipped through Omena and out of the harbor. In addition, the area became a tourist destination, with the earliest resort in Omena, the Shab-Wah-Sung Club, opening in 1868. Over the next several decades a growing number of summertime visitors came to Omena, with hotels and guest houses springing up to meet the demand.

Around the same time, commercial enterprises were established in Omena, with two general stores opening in the late 1880s. Three two-story frame houses were built near the stores. Rail service came to Omena in 1903. As automobiles appeared in the 20th century and M-22 became more busy, gasoline stations sprang up in Omena, with three by the mid-1930s. One of these gradually grew from a fruit stand to a gas station to a full-service garage with bar to a restaurant, and is now the home of Leelanau Cellars and Knot Just a Bar Restaurant.

== Description ==
The Omena Historic District consists of a set of buildings in the village of Omena, extending along M-22 on Omena Bay. The district includes houses, outbuildings, commercial buildings, and the Grove Hill New Mission Church. The district also includes the cemetery behind the church and two sets of historically significant dock pilings in the bay. The buildings date primarily between 1858 and 1935 and are typically one or two stories in height. The houses are typically Upright and Wing or Gablefront styles, and there are two False front commercial stores. Various buildings exhibit Greek Revival, Italianate, or Queen Anne details.
