= Peninsula Township, Michigan =

Peninsula Township, Michigan Old Mission Peninsula
- Civil township
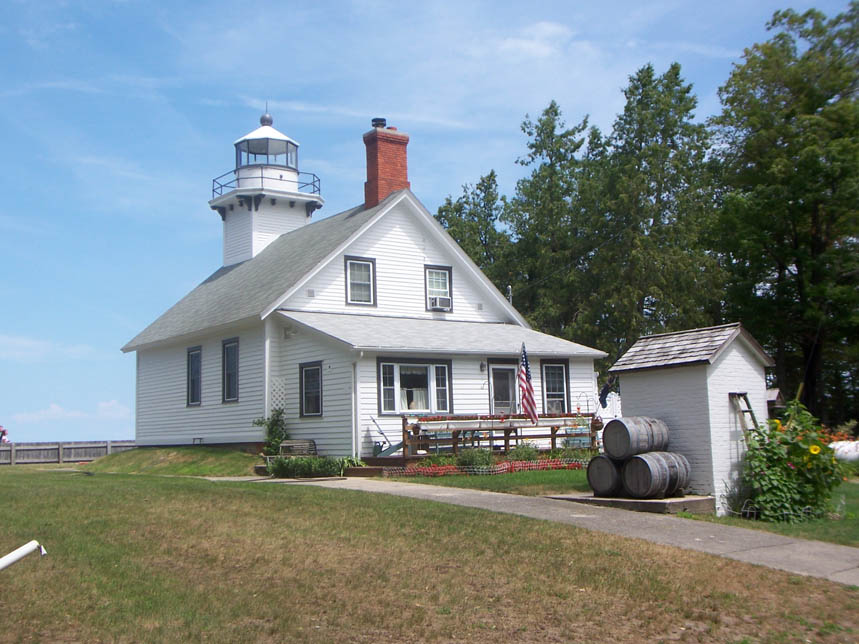
- Mission Point Lighthouse
- Nicknames: "The Peninsula", "O.M.P."
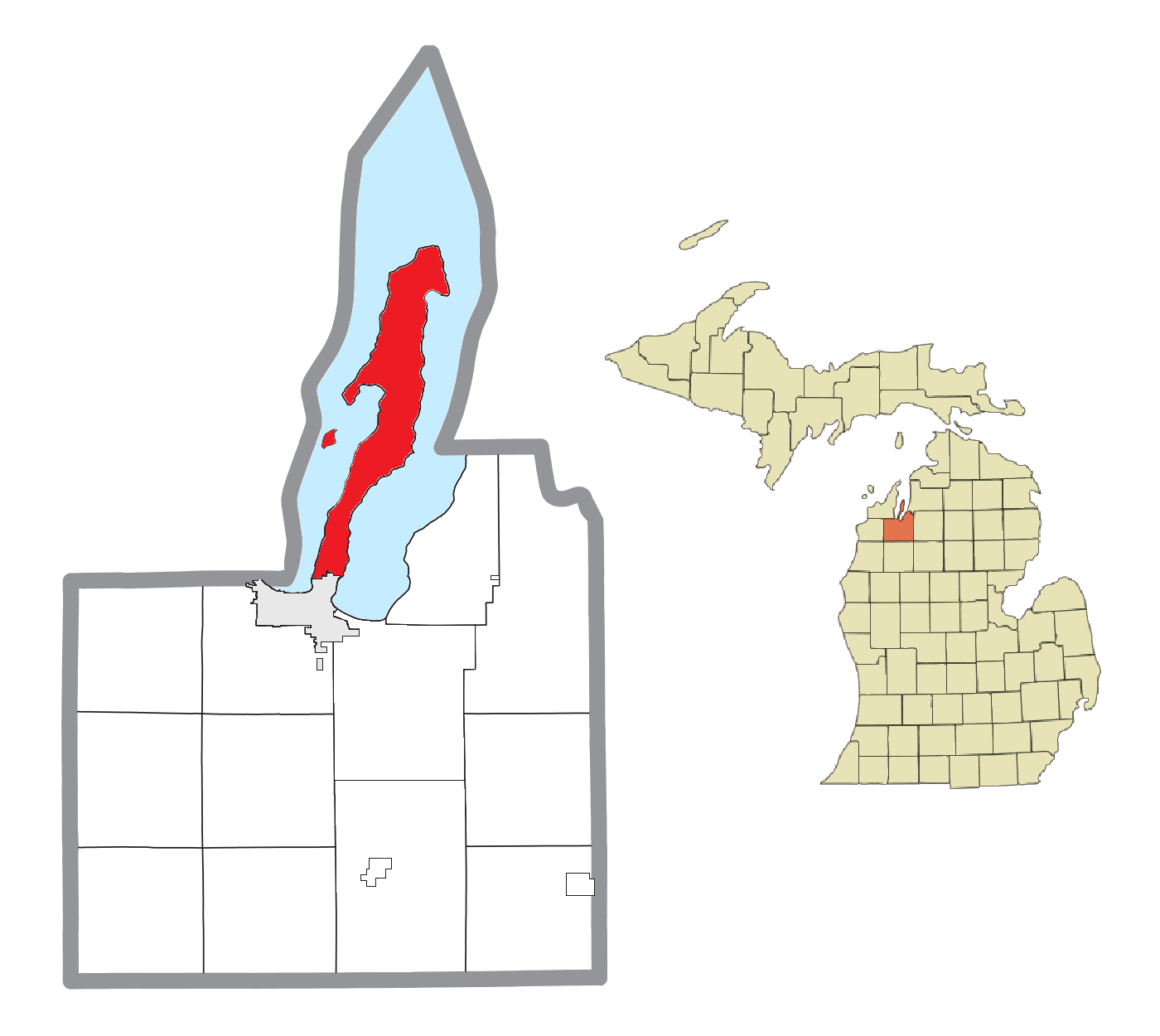
- Location within Grand Traverse County

- Location within the state of Michigan Peninsula Township (the United States)
- Coordinates: 44°52′41″N 85°31′53″W
- Country: United States
- State: Michigan
- County: Grand Traverse
- Organized: 1853

Government
  - Supervisor: Isaiah Wunsch
  - Clerk: Becky Chown

Area
  - Total: 31.9 sq mi (82.5 km^{2})
  - Land: 27.9 sq mi (72.2 km^{2})
  - Water: 4.0 sq mi (10.3 km^{2})
- Elevation: 594 ft (181 m)

Population (2020)
  - Total: 6,068
  - Estimate (2025): 6,160
  - Density: 191/sq mi (73.6/km^{2})
- Time zone: UTC-5 (Eastern (EST))
  - Summer (DST): UTC-4 (EDT)
- ZIP code(s): 49673 (Old Mission); 49686 (Traverse City)
- Area code: 231
- FIPS code: 26-63340
- GNIS feature ID: 1626889
- Website: www.peninsulatownship.com

Peninsula Township is a civil township of Grand Traverse County in the U.S. state of Michigan. The township had a population of 6,068 at the 2020 census, an increase from 5,433 at the 2010 census.

Peninsula Township is coterminous with (has the same dimensions as) the Old Mission Peninsula, which projects about 17 miles (27 km) north from its base in Traverse City into Grand Traverse Bay, an arm of Lake Michigan. The peninsula divides the Grand Traverse Bay into an East Arm and West Arm. The peninsula is well known for its cherry harvest and viticulture, and is included in the Old Mission Peninsula AVA, a federally recognized viticultural region. At the northern tip of the peninsula is Mission Point Light, which lies just south of the 45th parallel north.

Also part of Peninsula Township is Power Island, a small island in the West Arm of Grand Traverse Bay.

Interactive map of the Old Mission Peninsula and surrounding areas

== History ==
In 1836 the Odawa (Ottawa) and Chippewa Nations had ceded more than 13 million acres of the northwest section of Michigan's Lower Peninsula to the U.S. Government in the Treaty of Washington (1836). The treaty called for mission churches and schools to be established to educate the native children. Presbyterian ministers Peter Dougherty and John Fleming and four male missionaries founded a settlement at what is now Old Mission in May 1839, the first European settlement in the Grand Traverse Bay region.

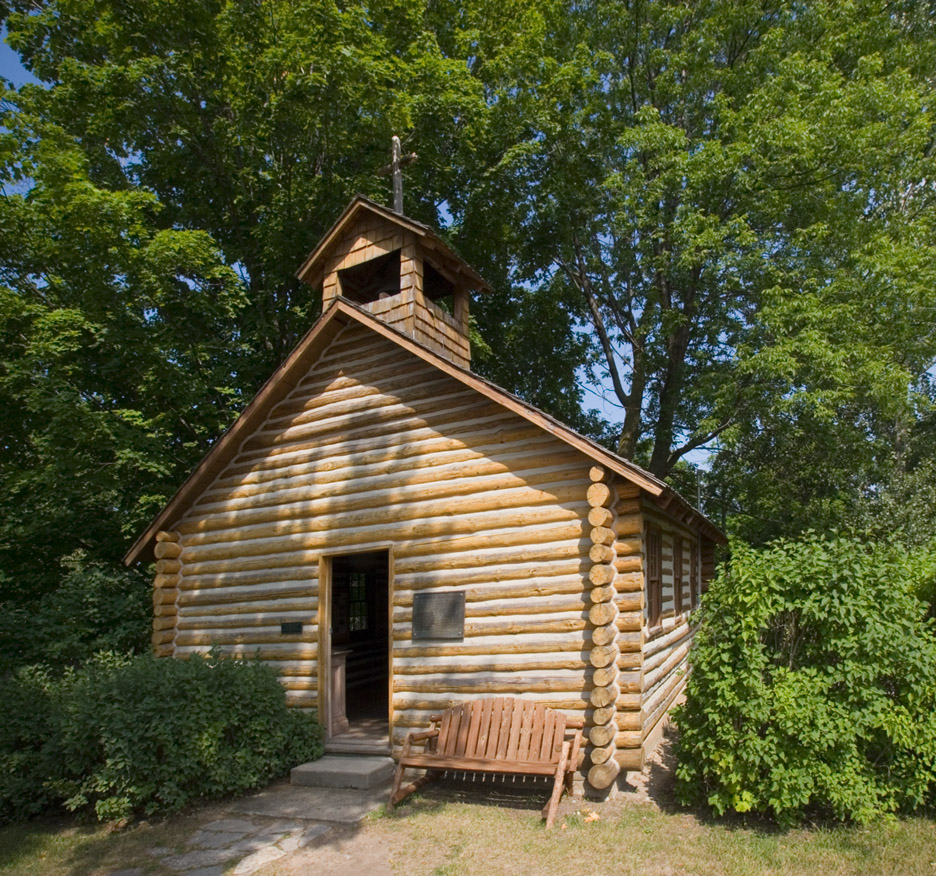
Replica of the 1839 Old Mission log church

Dougherty and Fleming spent the winter of 1838–1839 on Mackinac Island in Lake Huron, and sailed west in the spring. Upon their arrival at the Mission Peninsula in May, they encountered only one Native American resident of what appeared to be an abandoned village by the harbor. The native made smoke signals over a watchfire, summoning a canoe of tribesmen who paddled across the East Arm of Grand Traverse Bay to join the missionaries for a multi-day parlay. Dougherty and Fleming selected a nearby location to build the mission, one that was along canoe routes between native settlements. The mission church had peaceful relations with native residents in the surrounding area. The missionary settlement was originally called Grand Traverse.

In June 1839 Henry Schoolcraft arrived at the mission in a small vessel and helped to found a school there. By 1841 the seasonal village—important for sheltering tribal members during trading expeditions, hunts, communal fishing, and gathering wild rice—had grown to a permanent village, with 5 log buildings as well as several wigwams. By 1850 the settlement had grown to a considerable size, and the schooner Arrow was making weekly trips to the mission from Mackinaw City.

In 1851, a post office was established in Grand Traverse, with W.R. Stone as first postmaster. This was the only official post office in the Grand Traverse Bay region, indeed the only one between Mackinaw City and Croton. In 1852, Rev. Dougherty decided to move his mission across the west bay along the Leelanau Peninsula to an existing Native American village at the site of modern Omena, thus establishing a "New Mission". The previous community was nicknamed as the "Old Mission" in the early 1850s. By the time of the Civil War, the Presbyterian organization which funded Dougherty had financial difficulty, and missionary activities were discontinued. Dougherty sold his land there in 1868.

In 1852, the U.S. Postal Service, in consultation with Albert Tracy Lay, a founding father of Traverse City, decided to rename the post office at Grand Traverse to "Old Mission" and named the post office at the Boardman River from "Grand Traverse City" to "Traverse City", as the former was too long a name per post office guidelines. The name of Old Mission later was applied to the peninsula as a whole, which was previously referred to as the Grand Traverse Peninsula and the Ahgosa Peninsula.

In 1853, Peninsula Township was organized as one of Grand Traverse County's first two townships, the other being Traverse Township (taking up all of mainland Grand Traverse County, excluding the Old Mission Peninsula).

Beginning in the early 1940s, the Michigan State Highway Department (now MDOT) constructed Center Road to allow for easier access up the peninsula, with motorists previously having to remain on narrow and winding shoreline roads. Center Road is today the northernmost leg of state trunkline highway M-37.

== Geography ==
Peninsula Township contains the landmass known as the Old Mission Peninsula, and Power Island. According to the United States Census Bureau, the township has a total area of 31.8 square miles (82.5 km^{2}), of which 27.9 square miles (72.2 km^{2}) is land and 4.0 square miles (10.3 km^{2}) (13%) is water.

=== Old Mission Peninsula ===
The Old Mission Peninsula extends about 17 miles (27 km) from the Lower Peninsula of Michigan into Grand Traverse Bay, itself a bay of Lake Michigan. The peninsula separates Grand Traverse Bay into its West Arm and East Arm. Additionally, the peninsula is adjacent to Bowers Harbor and Old Mission Harbor, smaller inlets of the West Arm and East Arm, respectively. At its widest, the peninsula is only about 3.25 miles shore-to-shore (5.23 kilometers). Unlike the rest of mainland Grand Traverse County, the Old Mission Peninsula, like the neighboring Leelanau Peninsula, has unusually steep and rising terrain for the region. The northern end of the peninsula, however, is much flatter than the rest, though it does contain glacial drumlins.

=== Major highway ===
- M-37 (historically known as Center Road) runs for 17.25 miles (27.76 km) along the backbone of the peninsula, terminating in a cul-de-sac at Old Mission Point. It was designated what is now known as a Pure Michigan Byway Scenic Route in June 2007. The M-37 Scenic Heritage Route proposal is itself a unique resource concerning the character of the peninsula, and the activities along this byway. South of the peninsula, in Traverse City, M-37 intersects highways US 31 and M-72.

=== Communities ===
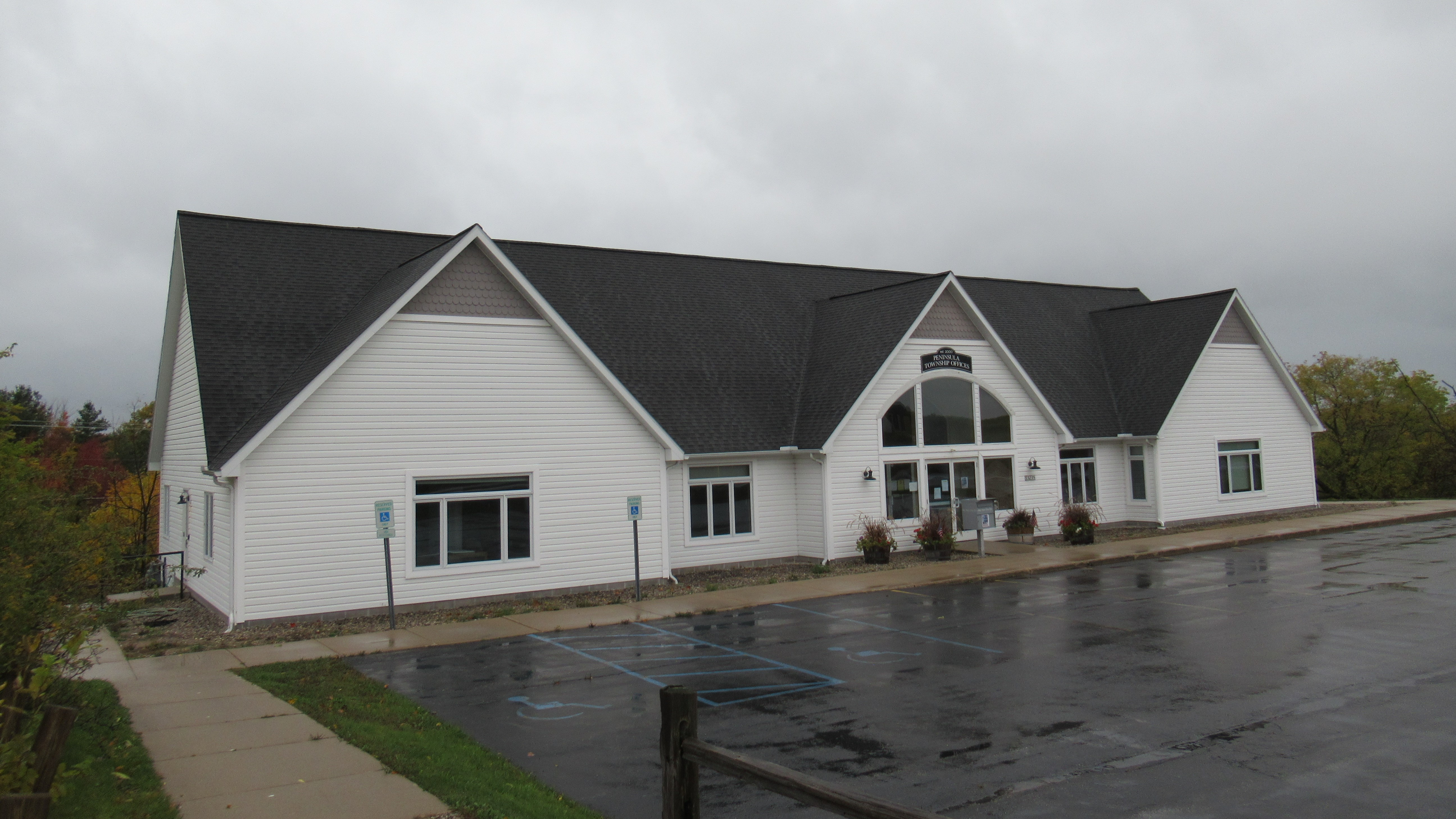
Town hall

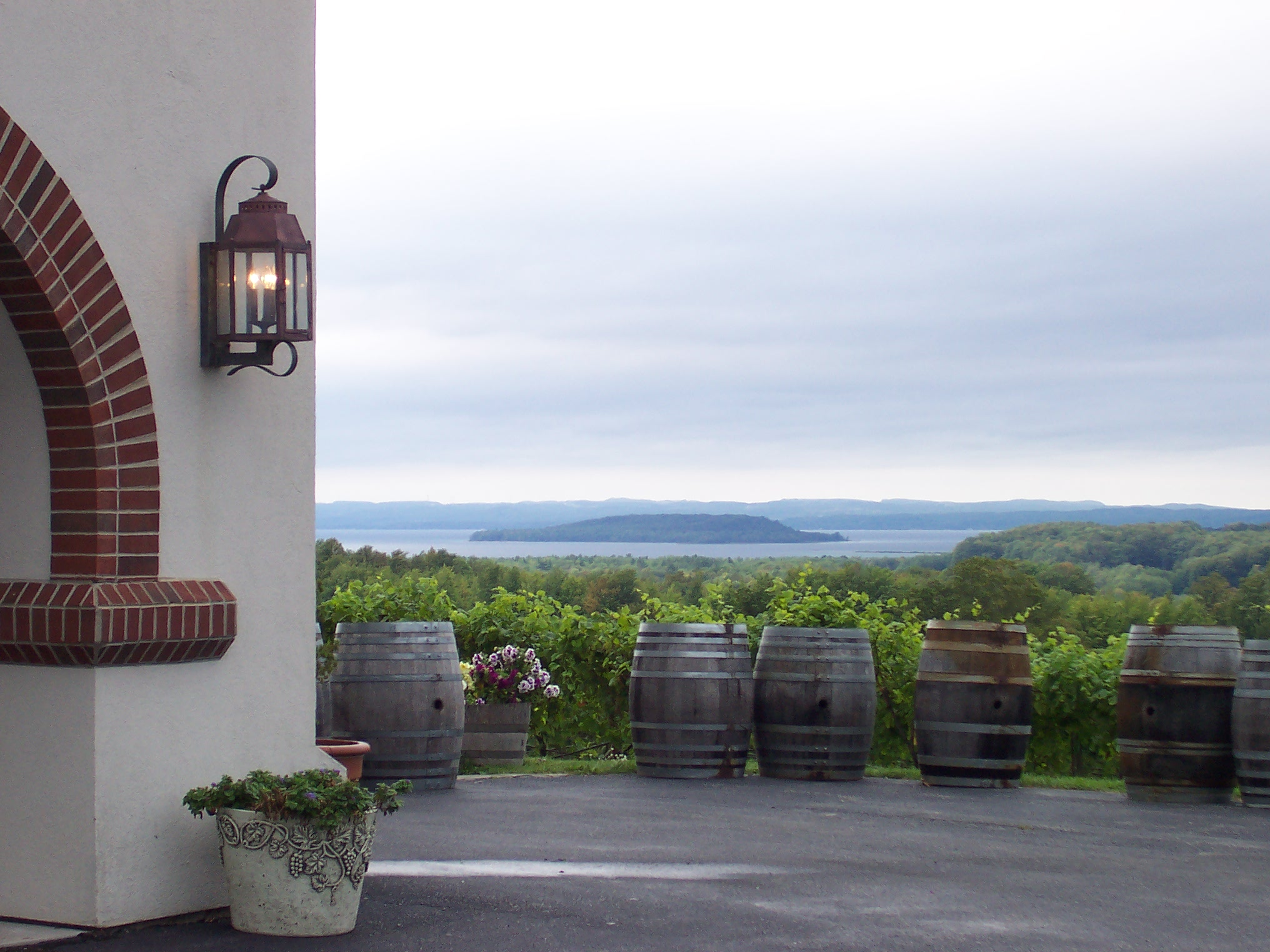
View of Power Island in West Grand Traverse Bay from Chateau Grand Traverse, about halfway up the Old Mission Peninsula. Power Island is politically part of Peninsula Township.

- Archie, a ghost town on the shore of East Grand Traverse Bay, at 44°50′06″N 85°32′23″W. Archie was given a post office in 1885, which lasted until September 1900. The post office reopened the following December, but was closed again in 1902.
- Mapleton is an unincorporated community roughly midway up the Old Mission Peninsula, along M-37 at 44°53′43″N 85°30′24″W. Mapleton was founded in 1859 by the Ogden family of New York state, with a post office opening the same year. The post office lasted until 1904. Today, despite being a small community, Mapleton is marked by signage along M-37.
- Neahtawanta is a historic summer resort colony at 44°53′37.5″N 85°33′17.1″W. The word "Neahtawanta" derives from Ojibwe words meaning "placid waters", in reference to Bowers Harbor. Neahtawanta was established in 1890 by the Neahtawanta Association, and a post office was established in 1907, only lasting until 1914. Today, Neahtawanta is still occupied by large summer resort homes, and the Neahtawanta Inn remains open.
- Ogdensburg, a ghost town at 44°55′41.7″N 85°30′18.5″W. Ogdensburg was founded by the same Ogden family in 1855, and was one of the region's first settlements. Today, all that remains is a cemetery.
- Old Mission is an unincorporated community in the township near the end of the peninsula on the east arm of the bay at 44°57′44″N 85°29′07″W.
- Traverse City is immediately adjacent Peninsula Township, bordering it to the south. Much of the south of Peninsula Township has suburbanized due to its proximity to Traverse City. Traverse City, though, is politically independent of Peninsula Township, and the two are administered separately.

== Demographics ==
As of the census of 2000, there were 5,265 people, 2,131 households, and 1,625 families residing in the township. The population density was 189.0 inhabitants per square mile (73.0/km^{2}). There were 2,613 housing units at an average density of 93.8 per square mile (36.2/km^{2}). The racial makeup of the township was 97.28% White, 0.06% African American, 0.36% Native American, 0.59% Asian, 0.97% from other races, and 0.74% from two or more races. Hispanic or Latino of any race were 2.01% of the population.

There were 2,131 households, out of which 27.5% had children under the age of 18 living with them, 70.4% were married couples living together, 4.7% had a female householder with no husband present, and 23.7% were non-families. 20.6% of all households were made up of individuals, and 10.5% had someone living alone who was 65 years of age or older. The average household size was 2.45 and the average family size was 2.84.

In the township the population was spread out, with 23.1% under the age of 18, 4.2% from 18 to 24, 19.3% from 25 to 44, 33.5% from 45 to 64, and 19.9% who were 65 years of age or older. The median age was 47 years. For every 100 females, there were 94.1 males. For every 100 females age 18 and over, there were 91.9 males.

The median annual income for a household in the township was $66,019, and the median income for a family was $82,426. Males had a median income of $52,750 versus $34,620 for females. The per capita income for the township was $40,753. About 1.1% of families and 2.3% of the population were below the poverty line, including 0.3% of those under age 18 and 2.3% of those age 65 or over.

== Recreation ==
- The "Old Mission Peninsula Cruise" is considered to be a "serendipitous" adventure for road bike riders. It is favored by local riders, including bicycle clubs, because of the scenery, the quality of the road, and lack of traffic.
- The peninsula is a great place to sea kayak. The bay offers a shelter from the prevailing westerly winds and from the Lake Michigan waves. One can get close to shore, the lighthouse, picnic grounds, and parks. Maps, rentals, and guided tours are available.
- There are many recurrent and special events. A calendar is available.

== Economy ==
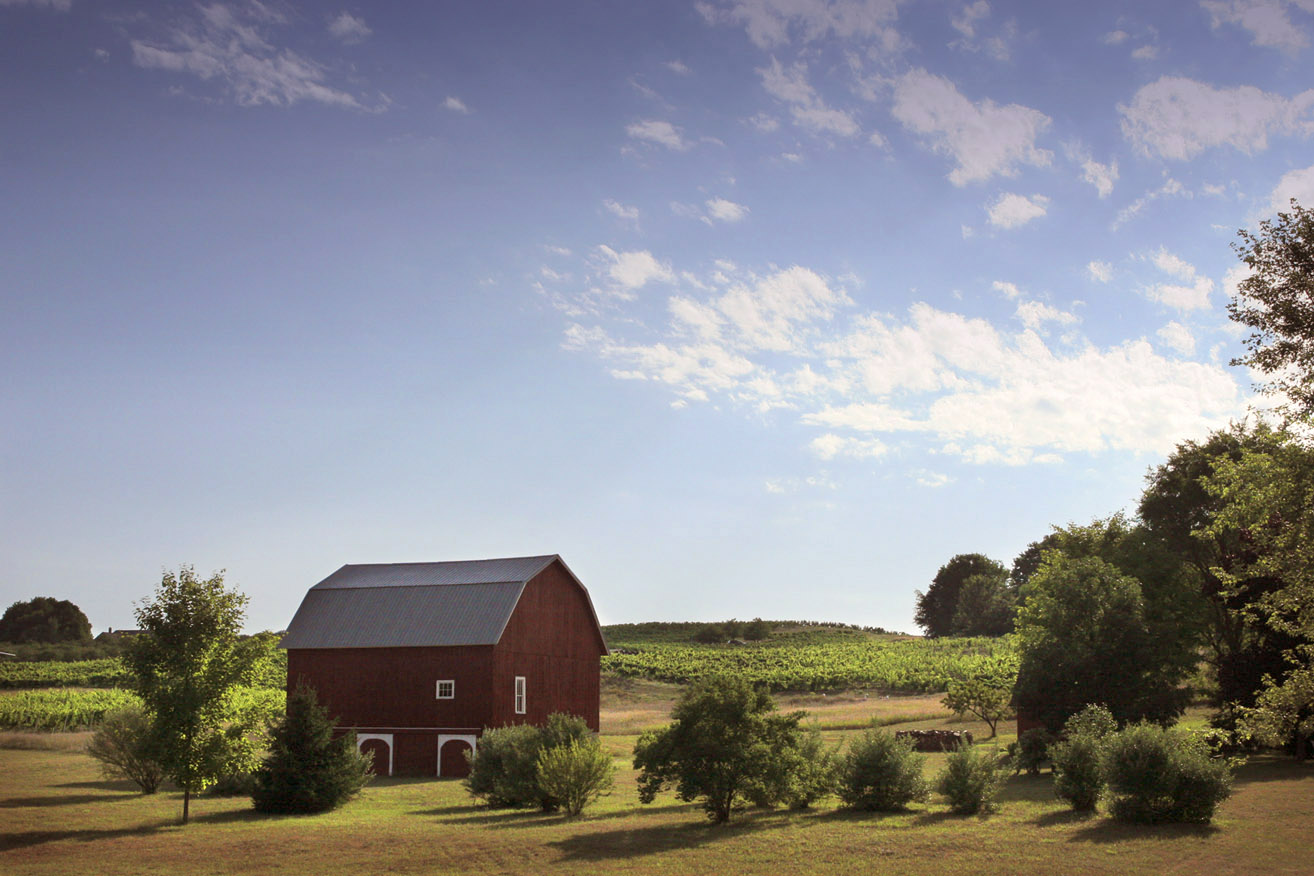
A pastoral farm scene located on the peninsula

There are eleven wineries on the Old Mission Peninsula. The Old Mission Peninsula sits close to the 45th parallel, a latitude known for growing prestigious grapes. The two Grand Traverse Bays provide the ideal maritime climate and the rich soil does the rest. Northern Michigan specializes in growing white grapes and is known for its Rieslings which grow well in the summer months and late fall, which Traverse City is known for. Every October the wineries host a harvest fest. Some Riesling grapes are spared being picked in the fall and instead are picked when they freeze, from which Ice Wine is made.

== See also ==
- Cherry production in Michigan
- Michigan wine
