= Grove Hill New Mission Church =

Historic church in Michigan, United States

- U.S. National Register of Historic Places
- U.S. Historic district – Contributing property
- Michigan State Historic Site
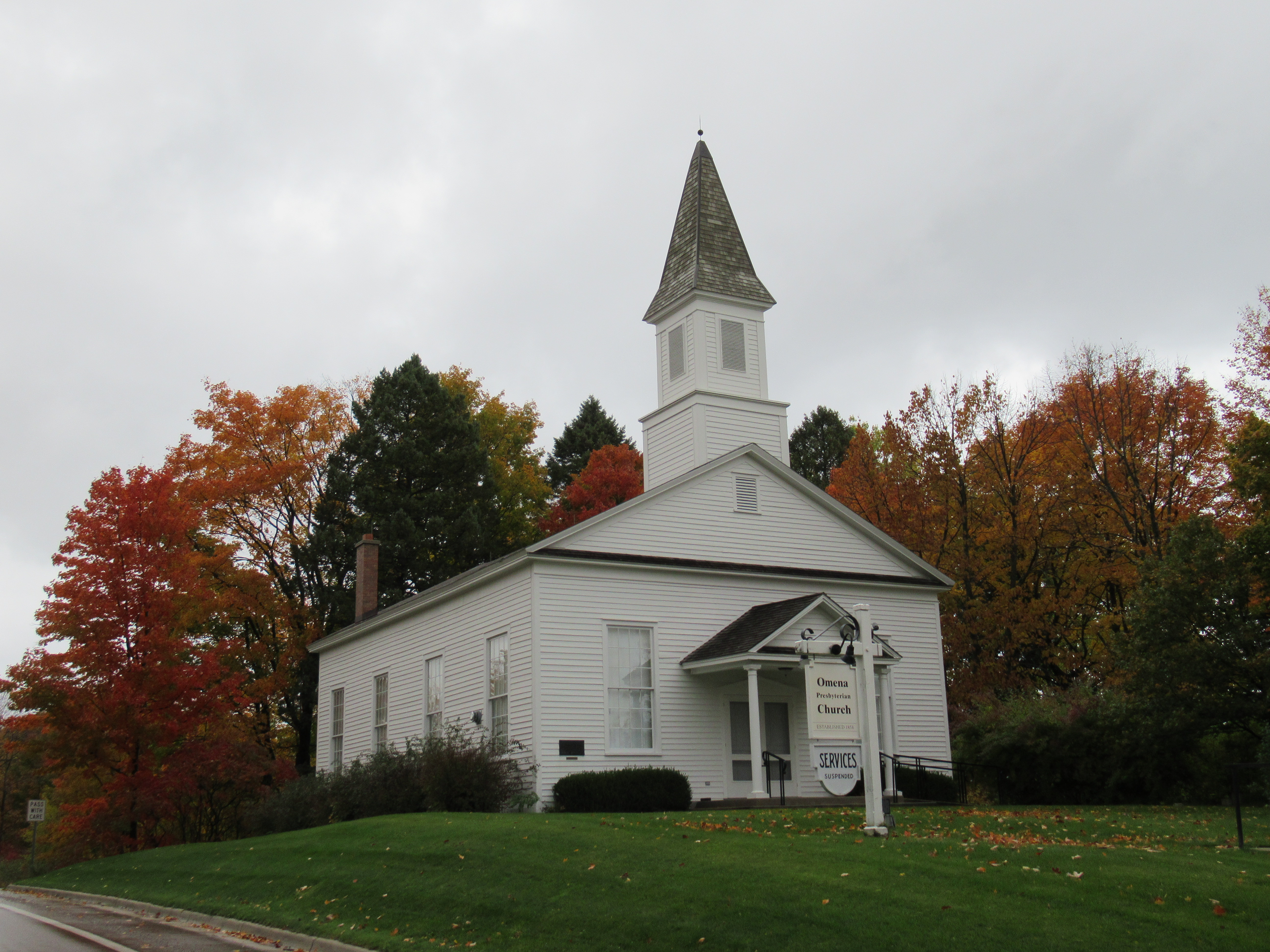

- Location within Michigan Location within the United States
- Interactive map
- Location: 5098 N West Bay Shore (M-22), Omena, Michigan
- Coordinates: 45°3′27″N 85°35′10″W
- Area: 1 acre (0.40 ha)
- Built: 1858
- Part of: Omena Historic District (ID100000534)
- NRHP reference No.: 72000631

Significant dates
- Added to NRHP: June 29, 1972
- Designated MSHS: October 29, 1971

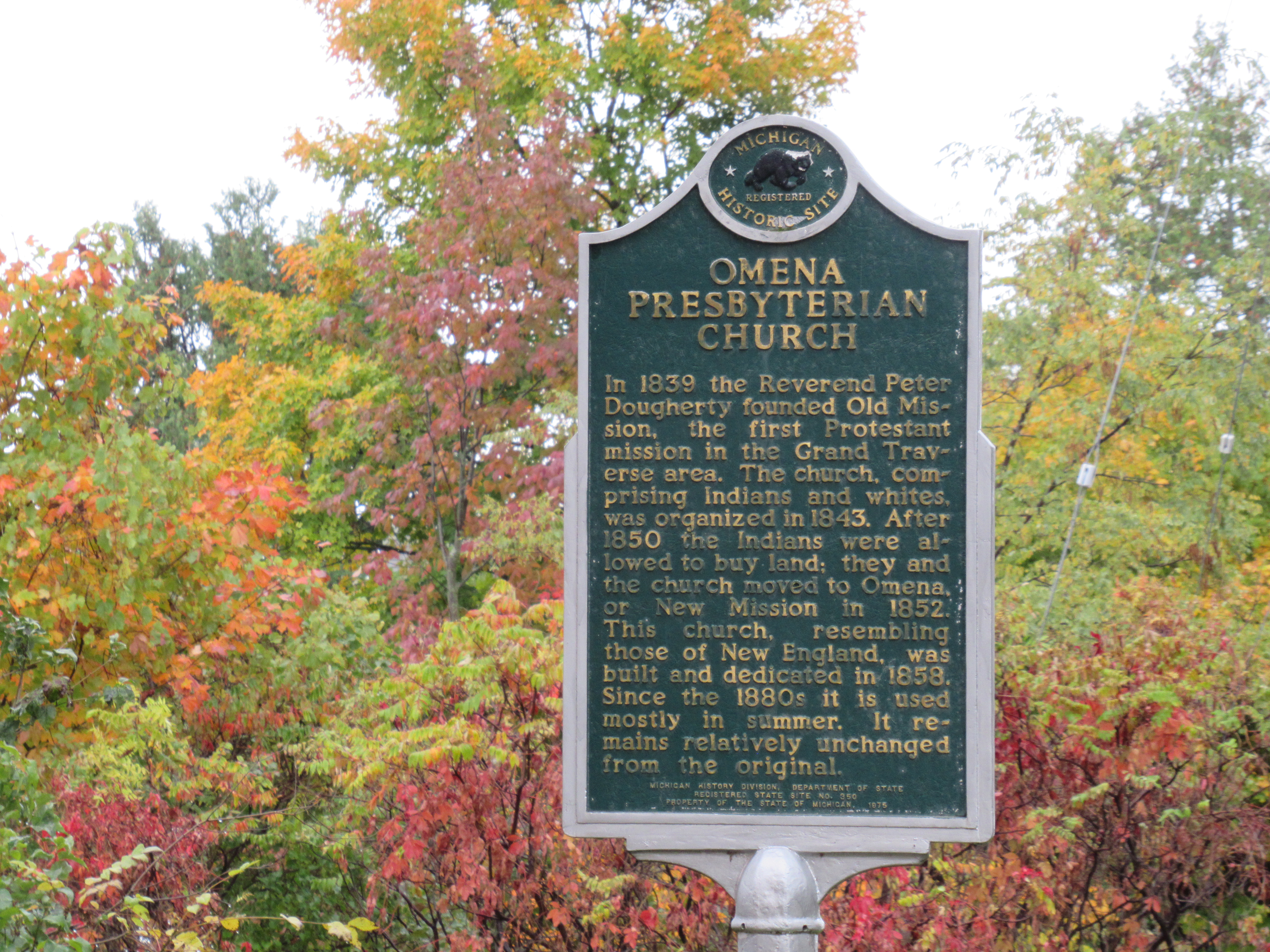
Michigan state historic marker

Grove Hill New Mission Church (also known as Omena Presbyterian Church) is a historic church located at 5098 North West Bay Shore (M-22) in Omena, Michigan. It was constructed in 1858, designated a Michigan State Historic Site in 1971, and listed on the National Register of Historic Places in 1972.

== History ==
In 1839, the Presbyterian Board of Missions sent the Reverend Peter Dougherty to the Grand Traverse area. He founded a mission located at what is now called Old Mission, Michigan. He organized a church, including both European and Native Americans, in 1843. In 1852, Dougherty and his mission moved to what is now Omena, establishing a "New Mission" there and constructing a mission and boarding school. In 1858, Dougherty commissioned three local carpenters to build this church, based on traditional New England church design. The church was used by the congregation until 1871, when financial difficulties forced the mission to close.

In 1885, the church was re-opened as a Congregationalist church. Since 1925, it has been used primarily in the summer months. It is still used as the Omena Presbyterian Church.

== Description ==
The Grove Hill New Mission Church is a rectangular frame front-gable structure sided with white clapboard. The roof is covered with shingles, and is capped with a square steeple. It measures approximately 35 feet (11 m) by 48 feet (15 m), and has a shed-roofed addition at the rear. The front entrance is covered with a triangular pediment supported by two pillars.
