= Grand Traverse Bay =

Arm of Lake Michigan in the Lower Peninsula of Michigan

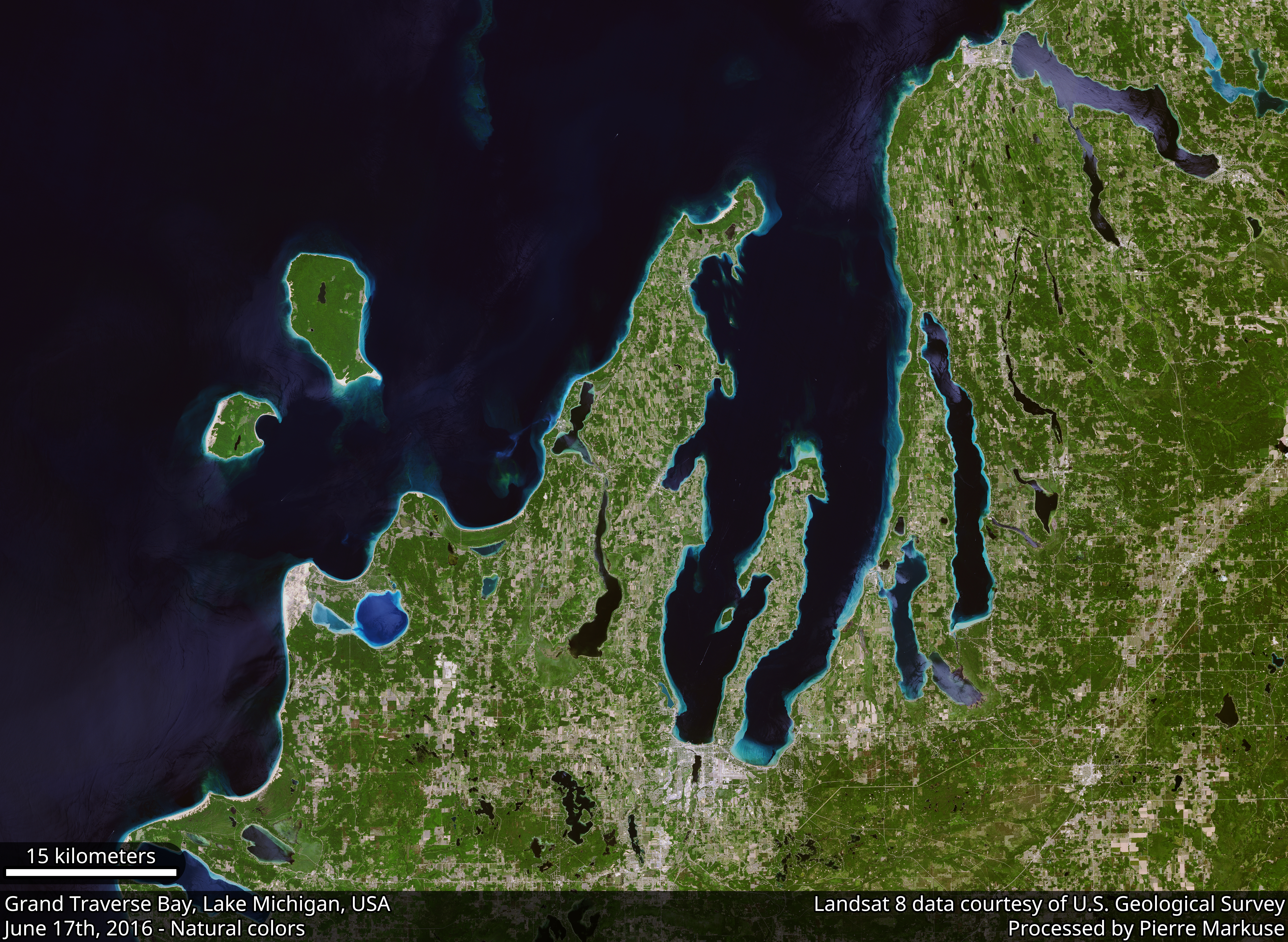
- Close-up satellite view of the Grand Traverse Bay, oriented with north at the top. Note the East and West arms of the bay, divided by the Old Mission Peninsula.

- Location within the state of Michigan
- Location: Antrim, Charlevoix, Grand Traverse, and Leelanau counties, Michigan, U.S.
- Coordinates: 45.06°N 85.48°W
- Type: Bay
- Part of: Lake Michigan
- Primary inflows: Boardman River, Elk River
- Surface elevation: 581 feet (177 m)
- Islands: Bellow Island, Power Island
- Settlements: Elk Rapids, Suttons Bay, Traverse City

Grand Traverse Bay (/ˈtrævərs/ TRAV-ərss) is an arm of Lake Michigan, located along the west coast of the Lower Peninsula of Michigan. The bay is separated from the rest of Lake Michigan by the Leelanau Peninsula. The bay is some 32 miles (51 km) long, ranges from 7 to 10 miles (11 to 16 km) wide, and up to 620 feet (190 m) deep in spots. It is the second-largest bay of Lake Michigan, behind Green Bay. Grand Traverse Bay is further divided into an East Arm and West Arm (colloquially East Bay and West Bay) by the 18-mile-long (29 km) Old Mission Peninsula.

The primary inflows to Grand Traverse Bay are Boardman River, which flows into West Bay, and the Elk River, which flows into East Bay. Notable communities that lie along the shore of Grand Traverse Bay include Traverse City, the largest city in Northern Michigan and at the head of both arms of the bay, and the villages of Elk Rapids, Northport, and Suttons Bay. The area surrounding the bay is renowned for its fruit production, especially for cherries and viticulture.

The bay is located within parts of the Michigan counties of Antrim, Charlevoix, Grand Traverse, and Leelanau.

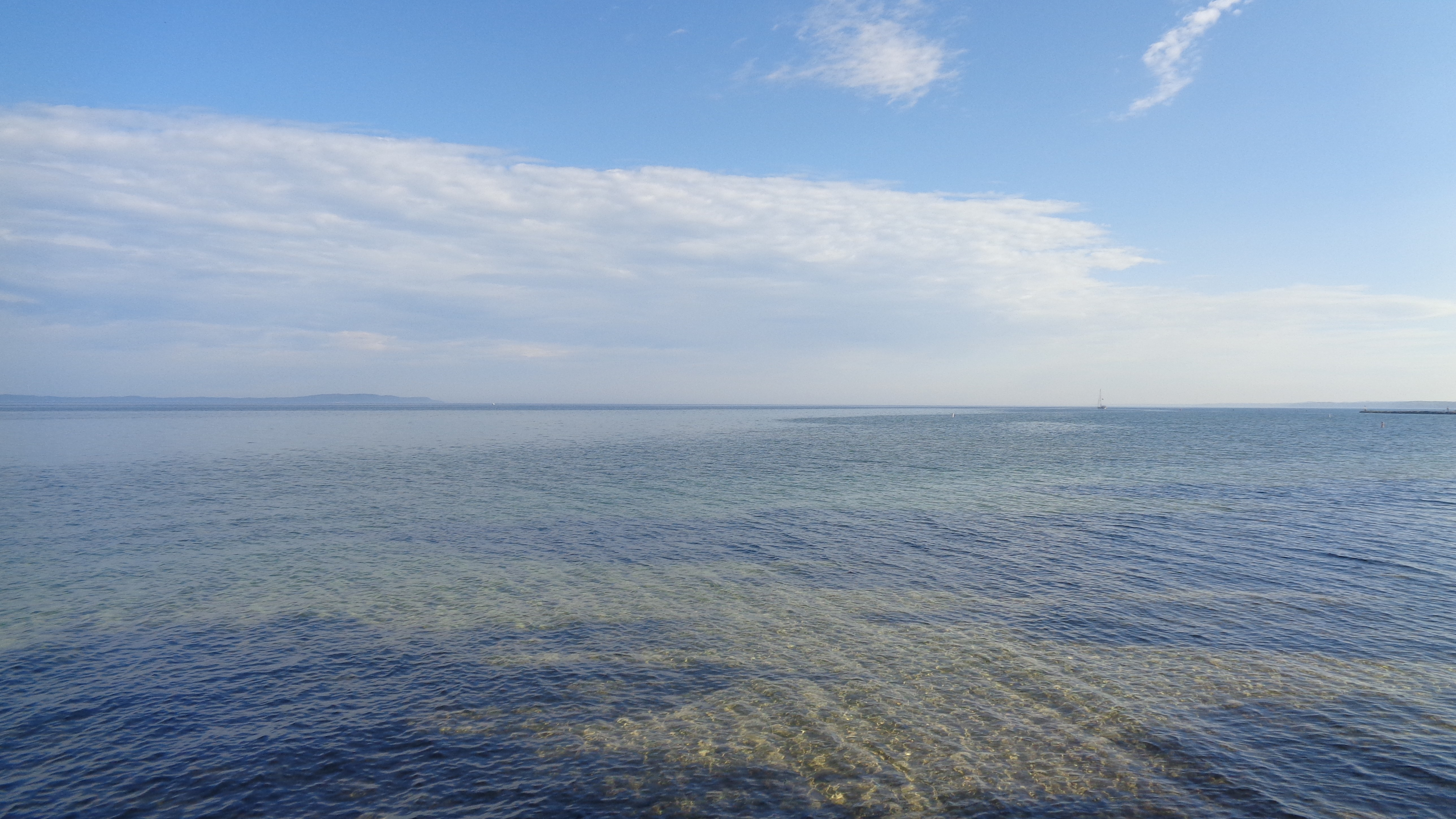
East Arm of Grand Traverse Bay looking north from Elk Rapids, with the Old Mission Peninsula in the background.

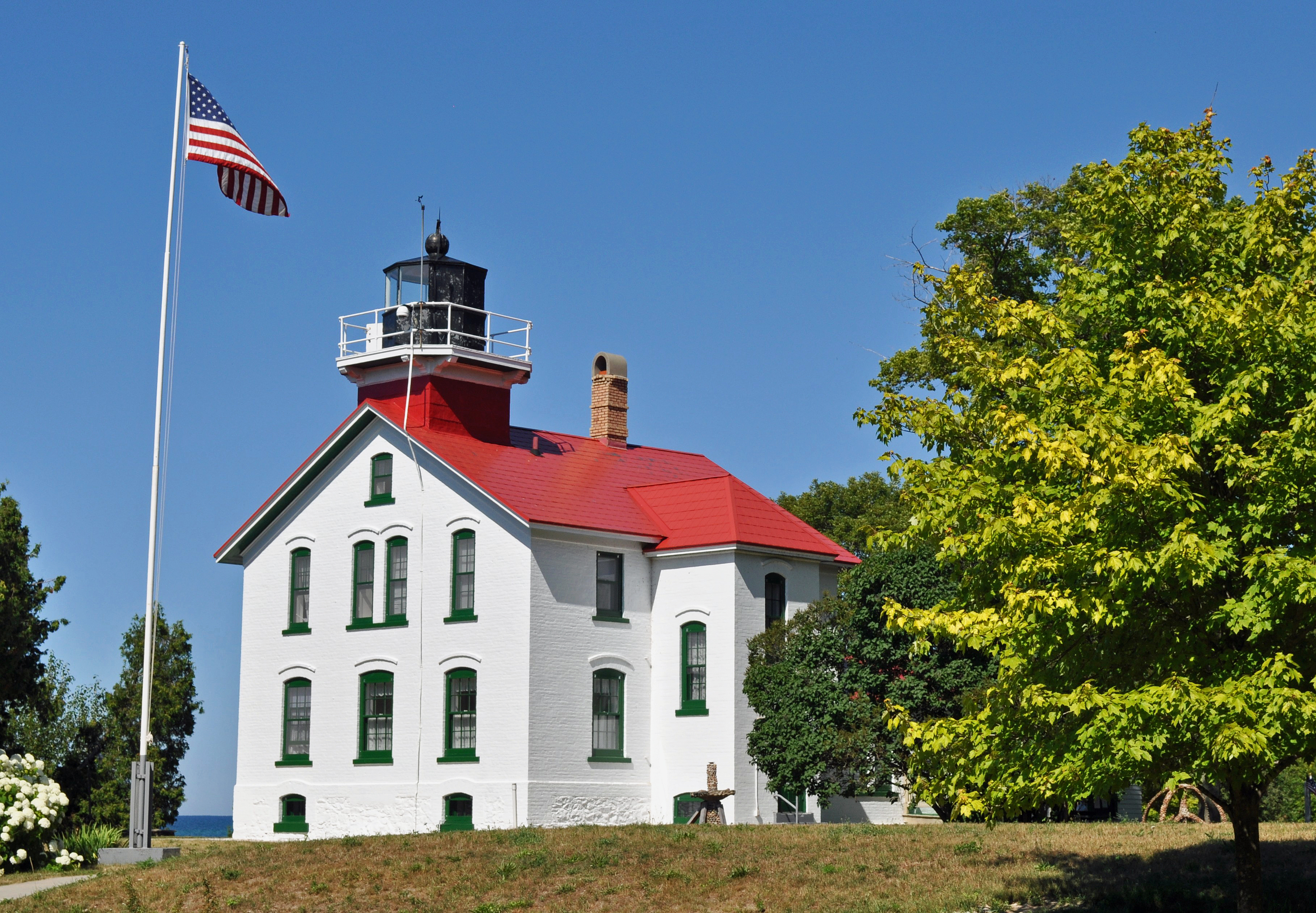
The Grand Traverse Lighthouse at the tip of the Leelanau Peninsula, which anchors the bay to the west.

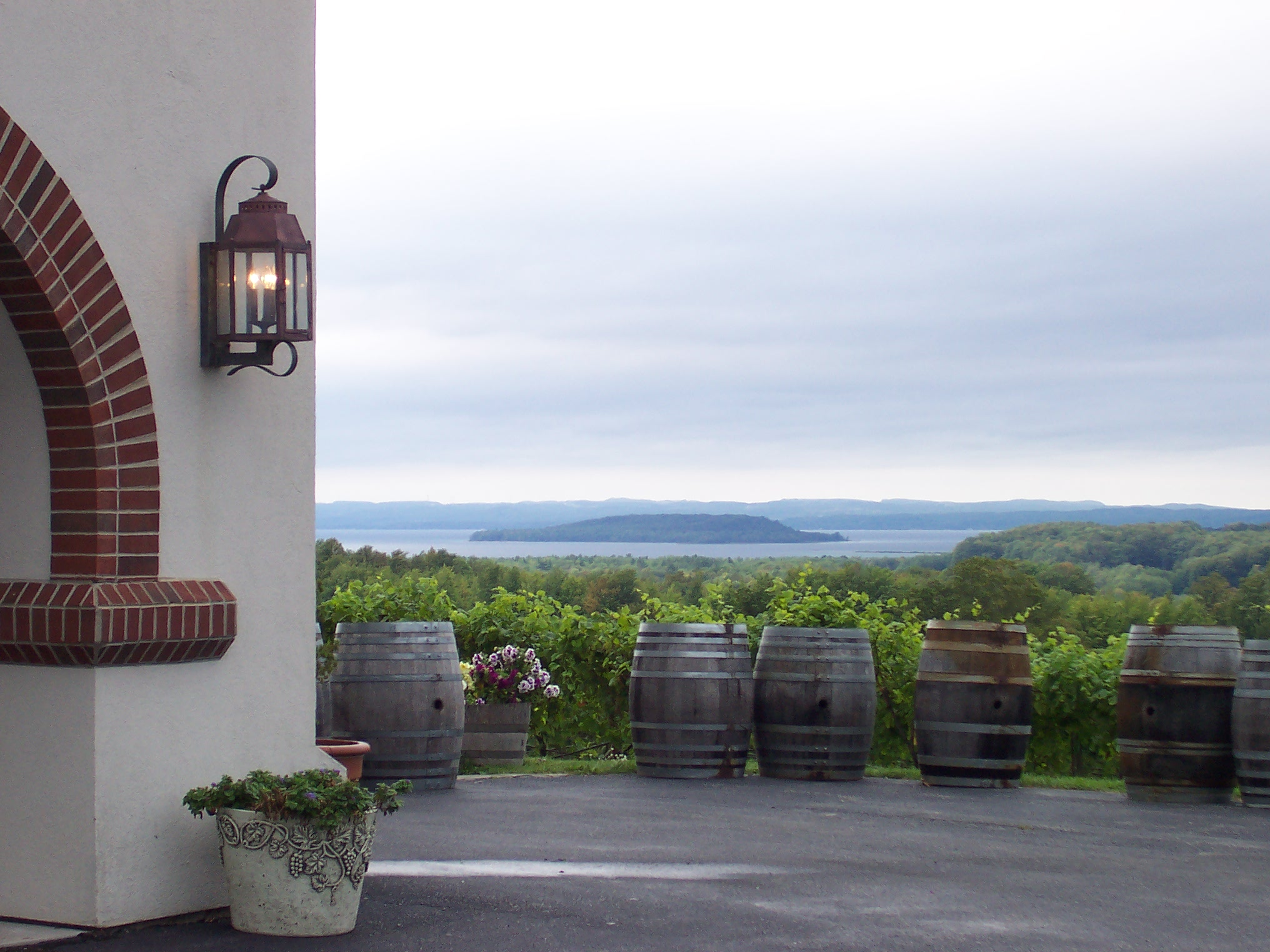
Power Island is the largest island in the bay, seen here from Chateau Chantal on the Old Mission Peninsula

== Etymology ==
Grand Traverse Bay earned its name from 18th-century French voyageurs who made la grande traverse, (Note: In modern standard French, traverse no longer has the sense of 'crossing'—which is now traversée.) or "the long crossing", across the mouth of bay. The area was owned by the French, followed by Great Britain as the Province of Quebec. After 1776, the area was owned by the Americans. On Old Mission peninsula, Rev Peter Dougherty started the first permanent settlement in 1839. This was called "Grand Traverse", but was later renamed to Old Mission.

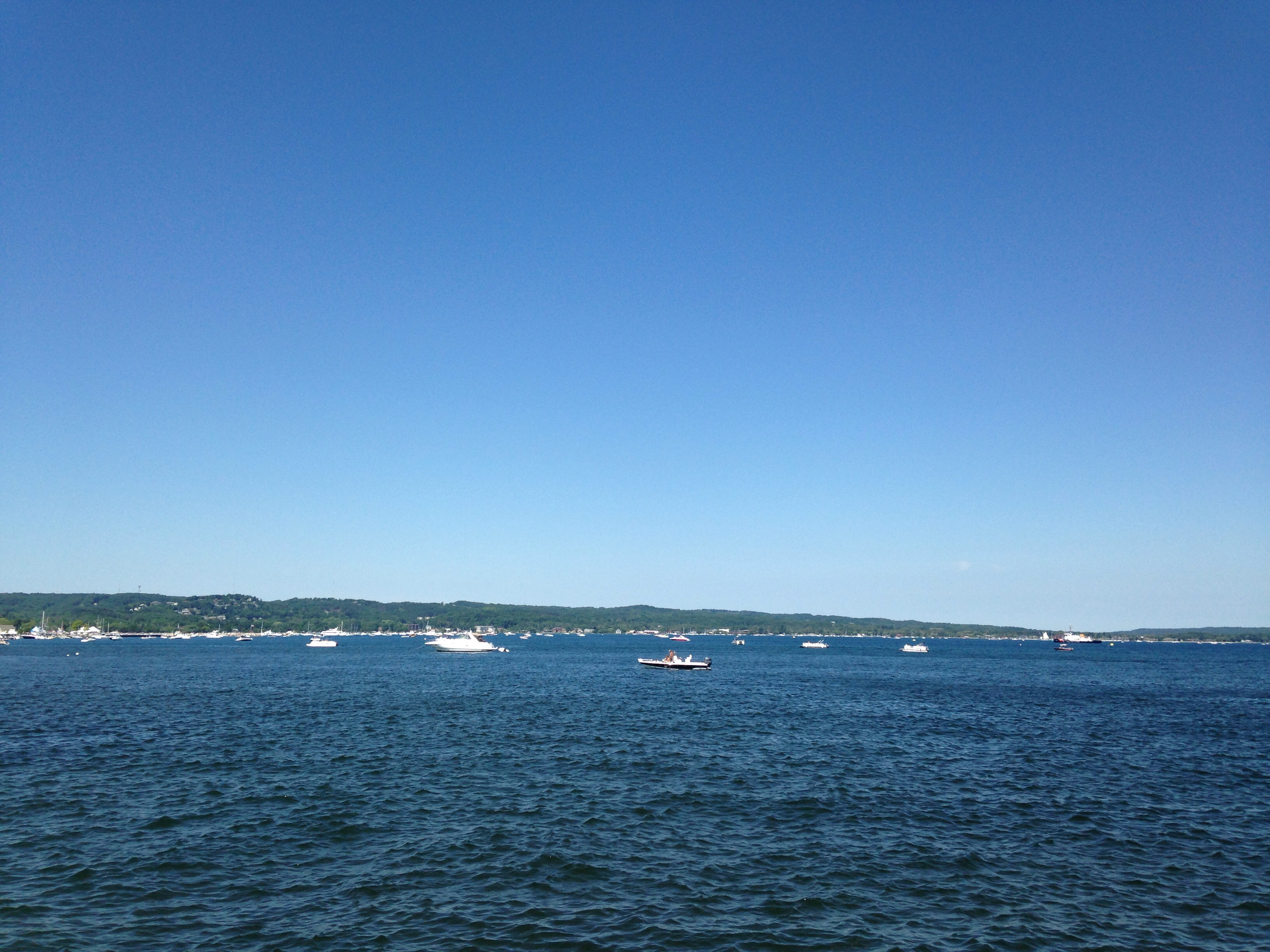
West Grand Traverse Bay from Traverse City, facing Greilickville.

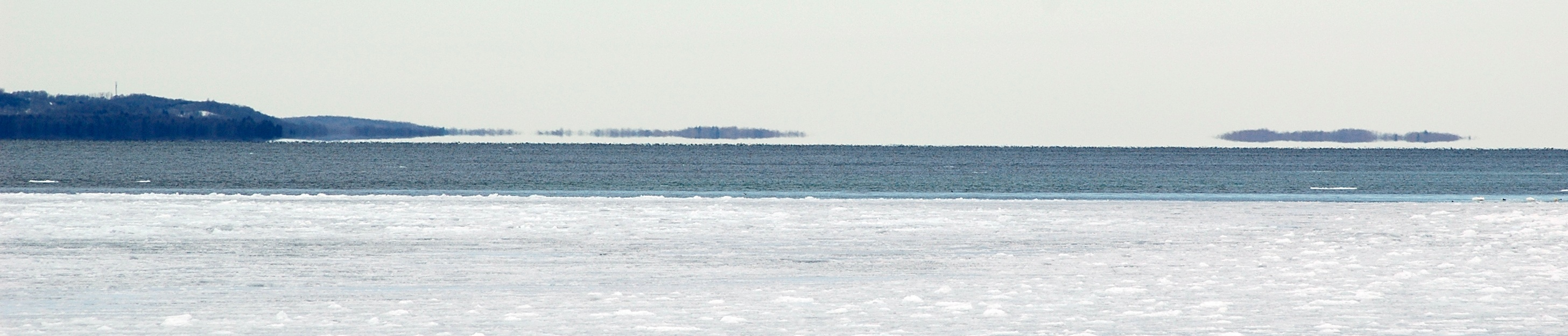
An inferior mirage over the bay

== Geography ==
Traverse City is situated at the south end of the bay where the Boardman River empties into the west arm. Cherry orchards line the bay region, giving rise to Traverse City's claim to be the Cherry Capital of the World. Several nationally known companies offer cherry-based products made with Northern Michigan tart cherries including Traverse Bay Farms, Cherry Central, Fruit Advantage, American Spoon, Cherry Republic and Old Mission Traders (formerly Cherry Stop). The region is the center of cherry production in Michigan.

The most notable feature of the bay is that it is bisected into East and West arms by the Old Mission Peninsula. In addition, Grand Traverse is divided further into several important smaller bays, including Northport Bay, Suttons Bay, Omena Bay, Bowers Harbor, and Old Mission Bay. Northport Bay, located at the northwest corner of Grand Traverse Bay is about 10 mi (16 km) long and 4 miles (6.4 km) wide. Northport Bay open to the east, except inside the arms at each end, with the Leelanau Peninsula on the West side. There are several shoals in Northport Bay marked by buoys. Bellow Island, a low gravel island covered by shrubs and located near the middle of Northport Bay, is owned by the Nature Conservancy; it is primarily known as a bird rookery, and is sometimes locally called Gull Island.

There are several marinas on the bay, including the large marinas in Northport, Greilickville, Traverse City, and Elk Rapids.

=== Communities ===
==== Antrim County ====
- Antrim City
- Eastport
- Elk Rapids
- Torch Lake

==== Charlevoix County ====
- Norwood

==== Grand Traverse County ====
- Acme
- Old Mission
- Traverse City
- Yuba

==== Leelanau County ====
- Greilickville
- Northport
- Northport Point
- Omena
- Suttons Bay

=== Arms and nested bays ===
The Grand Traverse Bay is divided by the Old Mission Peninsula into two arms:

==== East Arm ====
The East Arm of Grand Traverse Bay (colloquially known as "East Bay") is the deeper of the two arms. The arm is flanked to the west by the Old Mission Peninsula, the south and southeast by mainland Grand Traverse County, and to the east by southwestern Antrim County. The arm's primary inflow is the Elk River, which drains the Chain of Lakes.

==== West Arm ====
The West Arm of Grand Traverse Bay (colloquially known as "West Bay") is the shallower and more urbanized of the two arms. The urban core of Traverse City is located at the head of the West Arm. The arm is flanked to the west by the Leelanau Peninsula, and to the east by the Old Mission Peninsula. Power Island is located within the West Arm. The primary inflow of the West Arm is the Boardman River.

==== Nested bays ====
- Bowers Harbor
- Ingalls Bay
- Northport Bay
- Old Mission Harbor
- Omena Bay
- Suttons Bay

=== Islands ===
- Bassett Island
- Bellow Island
- Power Island

== Culture ==
Besides cherries, the surrounding countryside produces grapes and is one of the centers of the Michigan wine industry. Known for its shimmering blue water and golden sand beaches, the Grand Traverse Bay region is a popular vacation destination.

In September 2007, Mark Holley, an underwater archeologist with the Grand Traverse Bay Underwater Preserve Council who teaches at Northwestern Michigan College in Traverse City, said that they might have discovered a boulder 3.5 to 4 feet (1.1 to 1.2 m) high by 5 feet (1.5 m) long) with a prehistoric carving in the Grand Traverse Bay. The granite rock has markings that resemble a mastodon with a spear in its side. Confirmation that the markings are an ancient petroglyph will require more evidence. The stone can be seen in a TV documentary, and is pictured on page 9 of New Scientist Magazine of July 19, 2008.

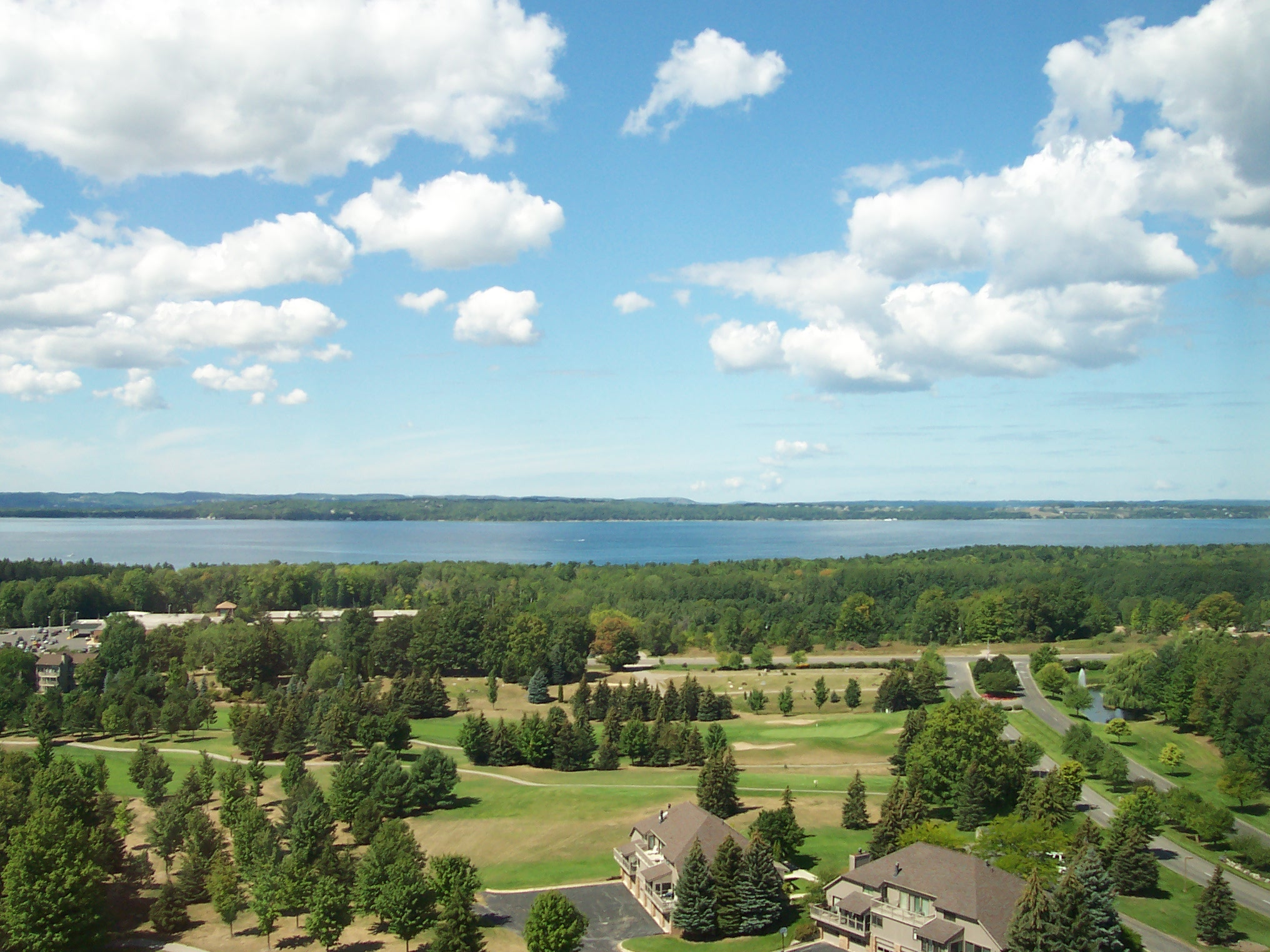
The East Arm of Grand Traverse Bay from the east, with the Old Mission Peninsula in the background. Hills of the Leelanau Peninsula are faintly visible on the horizon.

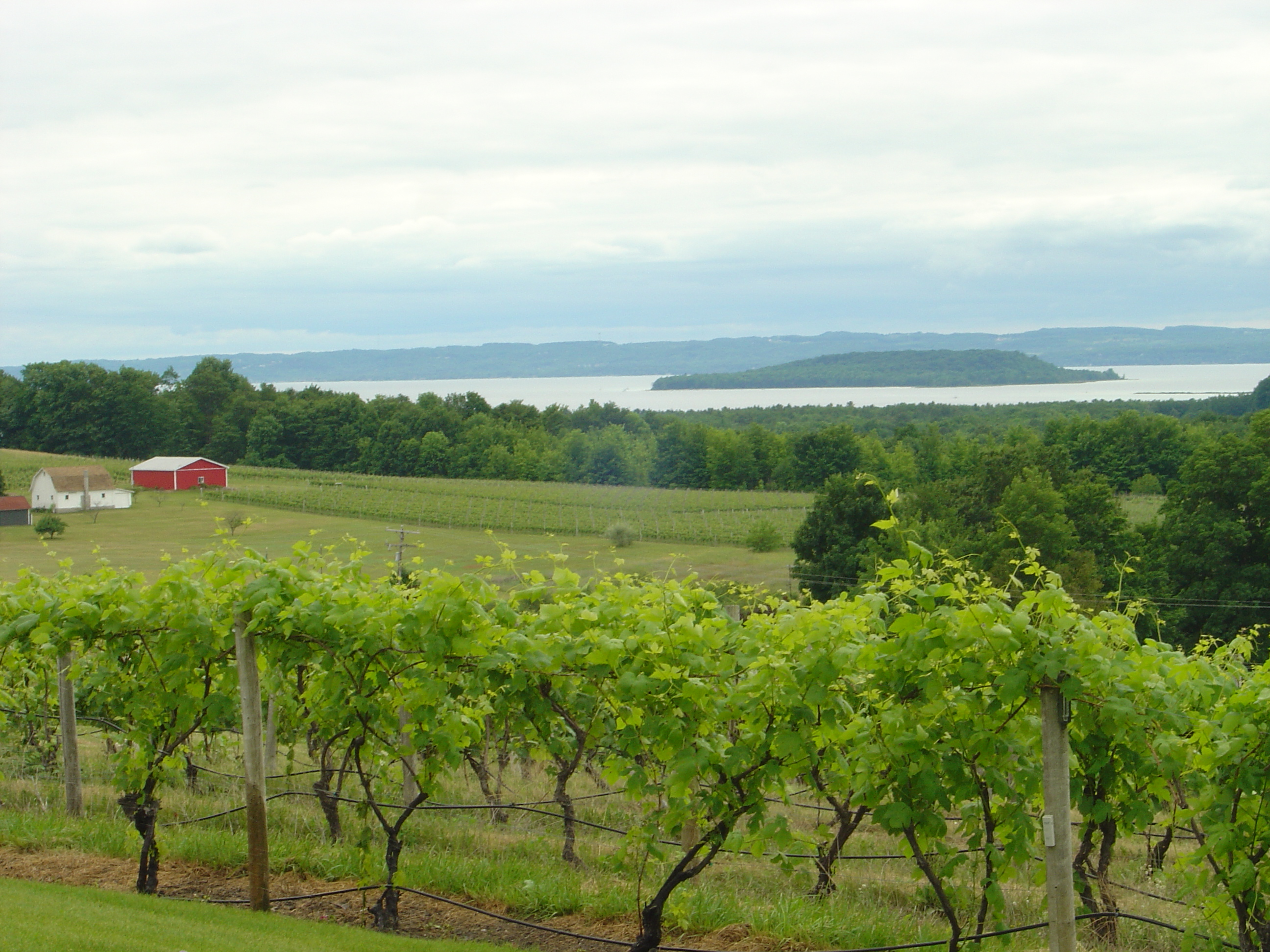
The West Arm of Grand Traverse Bay, seen from Chateau Chantal on the Old Mission Peninsula.

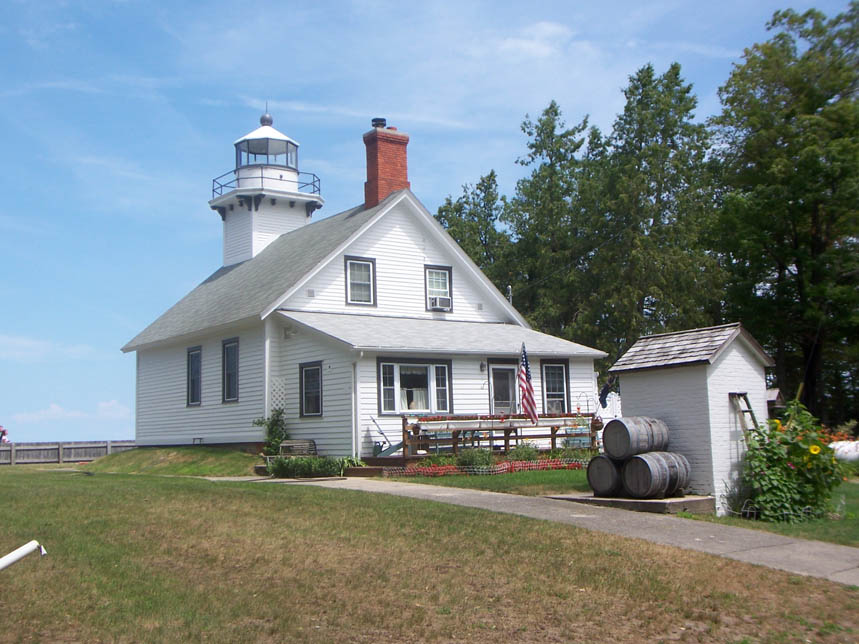
Mission Point Lighthouse sits at the end of the Old Mission Peninsula, which divides the bay into its East and West Arms.

== Shipwrecks ==
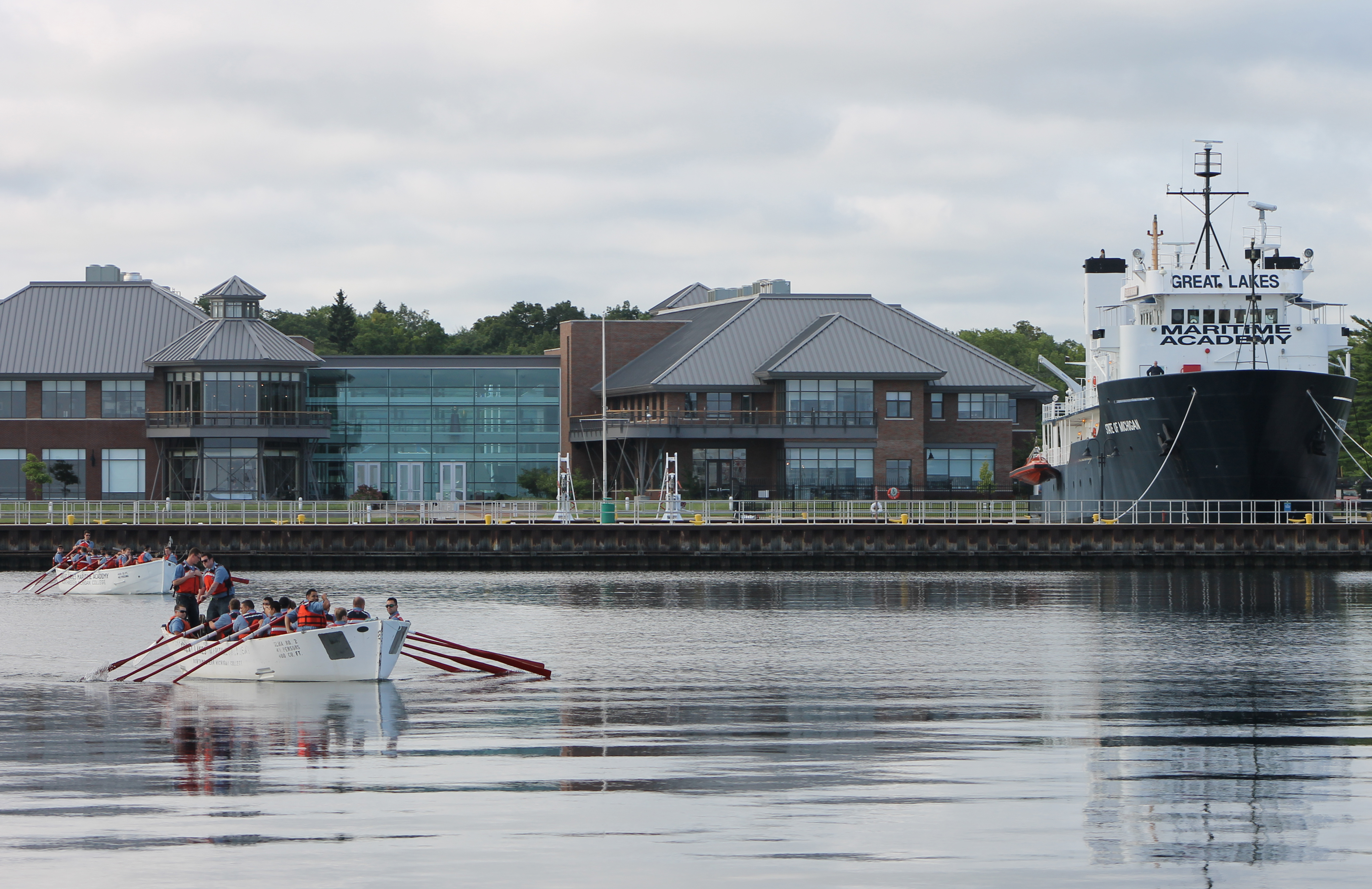
TS State of Michigan at the Great Lakes Maritime Academy in Traverse City, on the shore of the bay

The Grand Traverse Bay is home to the following shipwrecks:

- A.J. Rogers
- Metropolis
- Shale Scow
- Yuba Wreck
- Tramp
- Elmwood
- Nyord
- Barge
- Flora
