= Bellow Island =

Island in the Grand Traverse Bay, Michigan, U.S.

- Location within Michigan Location within the United States

Geography
- Location: Grand Traverse Bay, Lake Michigan
- Coordinates: 45.0999996°N 85.5675837°W
- Area: 7 acres (2.8 ha)
- Highest elevation: 179 m (587 ft)

Administration
- United States
- State: Michigan
- County: Leelanau County
- Township: Leelanau Township

Demographics
- Population: Uninhabited

Bellow Island, also known as Gull Island, is an island in the Grand Traverse Bay, a bay of Lake Michigan, located in Leelanau Township, Leelanau County, Michigan.

Bellow Island lies a little over a mile off the coast of Leelanau Peninsula in Northport Bay. The island is preserved as a sanctuary for herring gulls. A deteriorating cottage on south side is the only structure on the island.

== History ==
A cottage was built in 1910 by Edward Taylor Ustick Sr., after he purchased the island. It was designed by prominent Traverse City architect Jens C. Petersen. The cottage and island ownership passed through his family until 1948 when the house was destroyed by vandals. Tourism by Northport visitors to the island was common in the early 50s, but died off soon after. During the mid-60s, the first discoveries of the pesticide DDT's impact on thinning bird shells occurred on the island. It has been owned and operated by the Leelanau Conservancy since it was donated to them in 1995. The island is now sealed off from the public and no humans are allowed to disturb the nesting birds.

== Ecology ==
The island is an important site for herring gull research, as it is one of the largest nesting herring gull colonies in Northern Michigan. Other major species that nest there include Double-crested cormorants and Ring-billed gulls. The first discoveries of the pesticide DDT's impact on thinning bird shells occurred on the island through research funded by the University of Michigan in the mid-60s.

== Climate ==
Bellow Island

Climate chart (precipitation, max. and min. temperature)
J	F	M	A	M	J	J	A	S	O	N	D
79 −5 −11	61 −11 −20	60 −2 −10	126 3 −3	101 9 3	86 16 10	94 20 15	59 18 16	124 17 16	173 9 8	124 9 5	78 3 −2
- █ Average max. and min. temperatures in °C
- █ Precipitation totals in mm
Imperial conversion
J	F	M	A	M	J	J	A	S	O	N	D
3.1 23 12	2.4 12 −4	2.4 28 14	5 37 27	4 48 37	3.4 61 50	3.7 68 59	2.3 64 61	4.9 63 61	6.8 48 46	4.9 48 41	3.1 37 28
- █ Average max. and min. temperatures in °F
- █ Precipitation totals in inches
