= Eugene Power =

American entrepreneur (1905–1993)

- Born: Eugene Barnum Power; June 4, 1905; Traverse City, Michigan, US
- Died: December 6, 1993 (aged 88); Ann Arbor, Michigan, US
- Education: University of Michigan (BA, MBA)
- Occupations: Entrepreneur, philanthropist
- Known for: Founder of University Microfilms

Eugene Barnum Power (June 4, 1905 – December 6, 1993) was an American entrepreneur, philanthropist, founder of the modern microfilm industry, and pioneer in the use of microfilm for the reproduction of scholarly publications.

== Life and career ==
Born in Traverse City, Michigan, on June 4, 1905, Power received his BA degree in 1927 and his MBA in 1930, both from the University of Michigan. He married Sadye L. Harwick in 1929, and the couple had one son, Philip. His wife died in 1991.

During World War II, Power directed the microfilming of thousands of rare books and other printed materials in British libraries. He paid the library a minimal fee per exposure and then took the film to the United States where he sold copies to US libraries. The idea was both a clever business arrangement and a benefit to American scholars, who lacked access to European library collections. It was also an inventive form of preservation in light of wartime threats to libraries. Queen Elizabeth II knighted Power in the 1970s for this preservation work.

In 1938, Power founded University Microfilms International in Ann Arbor, Michigan, which is widely credited with having invented "micropublishing." Later, the company would merge microfilm with xerography, helping to make out-of-print books available for circulation again. The company also pioneered a business model for publishing limited-interest doctoral dissertations, becoming the publisher of record for all U.S. dissertations in 1951. University Microfilms was acquired by the Xerox Corporation in 1962 for $8 million. Power continued to work for Xerox until his mandatory retirement in 1970 at the age of 65. The company he founded is now ProQuest.

Power served two terms as a regent of the University of Michigan, served on the council of the National Endowment for the Humanities, and became president of the Association of Governing Boards of Universities and Colleges in 1970. He was elected to the American Philosophical Society in 1975.

In 1987, Marion Island in Lake Michigan, was renamed "Power Island". Power died of Parkinson's disease in 1993 at the age of 88.

== Philanthropy ==
In 1967, Power created the Power Foundation for philanthropy. He donated funds to establish the Power Center for the Performing Arts at his alma mater, the University of Michigan. He also endowed a scholarship program at the university (affiliated for many years with Magdalene College at Cambridge University) and helped to buy the site of the Battle of Hastings in England to preserve it from real estate speculation.

In 2018, his son and daughter-in-law, Philip and Kathy Power, donated their family's significant collection of Inuit art to the University of Michigan Museum of Art. It numbered more than 200 stone sculptures and prints and valued at more than $2.5 million, as well as a $2 million gift to initiate and endow the Power Family Program in perpetuity.
