= Mission Point Light =

Lighthouse in Michigan

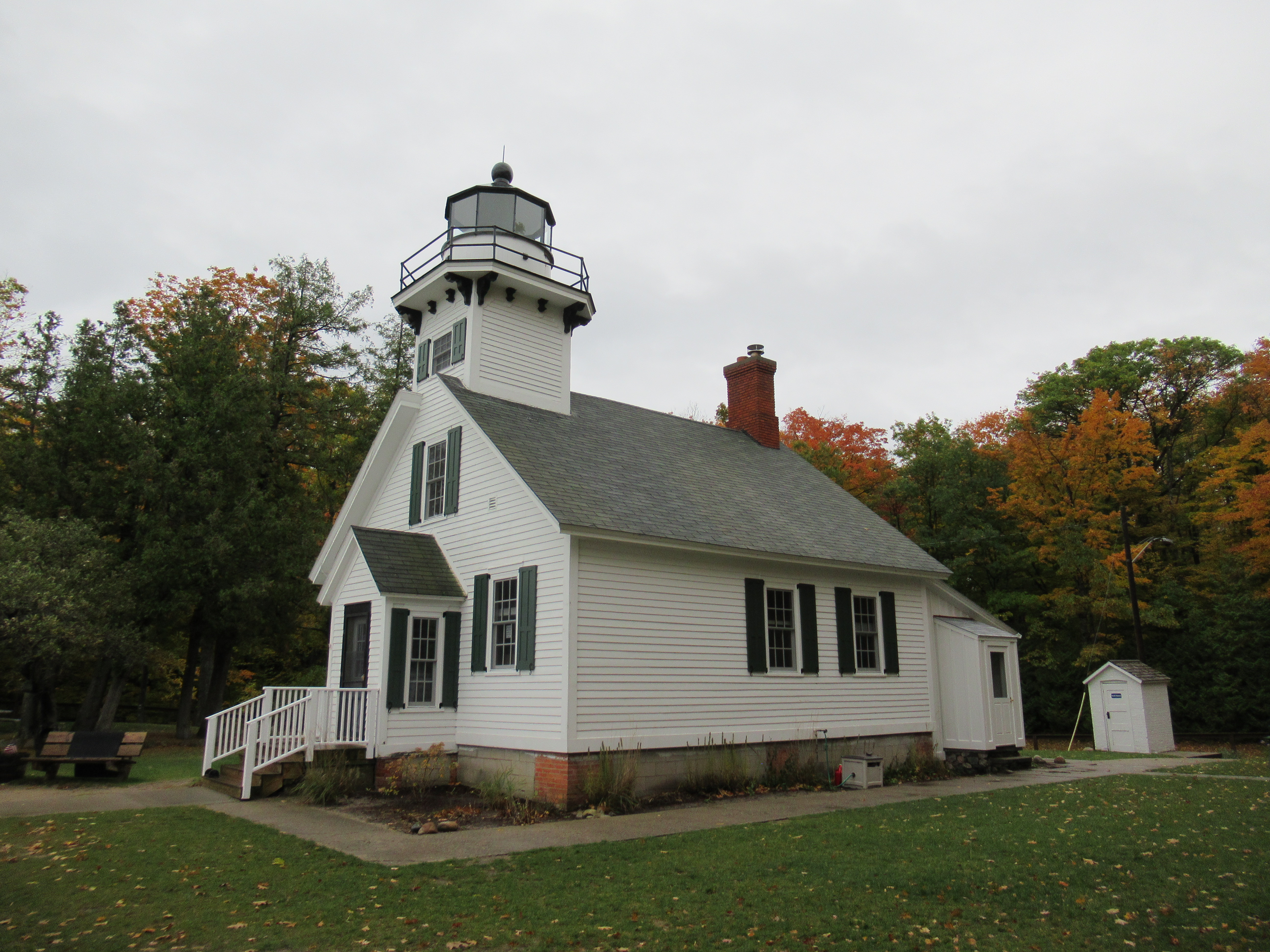
- Mission Point Light in October 2020
- Location: Peninsula Township, Michigan
- Coordinates: 44°59′28.7″N 85°28′46.1″W

Tower
- Constructed: 1870
- Construction: Wood
- Height: 36 feet (11 m)
- Shape: Square tower on dwelling
- Markings: White with black trim

Light
- First lit: 1870
- Deactivated: 1933
- Focal height: 47 feet (14 m)
- Lens: Fifth order Fresnel lens
- Range: 8.7 nautical miles; 16 kilometres (10 mi)
- Characteristic: Flashing W 6 seconds.

Michigan State Historic Site
- Designated: October 15, 1992

Mission Point Light is a lighthouse located in Michigan at the end of Old Mission Point, a peninsula jutting into Grand Traverse Bay 17 miles (27 km) north of Traverse City. It was built in 1870 as an exact copy of the Mama Juda Light (now destroyed), which was built on the Detroit River in 1866.

The foundation is natural and emplaced. The wooden structure is painted white with black trim. The square tower is attached to a dwelling.

A fixed white Fifth Order Fresnel lens was installed. The building was only one and a half stories tall. However, its placement on a sand bank 14 feet above the lake's surface created a lens focal plane of 47 feet (14 m). It was visible from 13 miles (21 km) at sea. It has been an ongoing struggle to maintain the dune and protect it and the lighthouse from erosion.

The light served to warn mariners about the shoals off the point for 63 years. It was a working lighthouse from 1870 to 1933, when it was decommissioned. However, new techniques in offshore construction and the automation of lighthouse illumination made it possible to build a navigation aid on the shoal itself. In 1938, work was completed for the new stationary buoy light in 19 feet (5.8 m) of water, about 2 miles (3.2 km) northwest of Mission Point. The light runs on batteries. It is on a 36-foot (11 m) tall tower, and its focal plane of 52 feet (16 m) makes it visible for 13 miles (21 km). It has a 30-second dwell time between flashes, in order to conserve power. It is still maintained by the Coast Guard today and only shines North.

Famously, the lighthouse stands a few hundred yards south of the 45th parallel north, halfway between the North Pole and the Equator. It was deactivated in 1933 and purchased by the State of Michigan. There are a pair of signs that denote its location on the parallel, one of 29 places in the U.S. with such signs.

== Current status and activities ==
The lighthouse is located in Old Mission State Park, which is managed by Peninsula Township as Lighthouse Park at the northern end of Highway M-37. Visitors to the park enjoy the beach, hiking trails, and picnic areas. The park welcomes about 100,000 visitors annually from every state and dozens of foreign countries.

The lighthouse society sought volunteers to work and live in the Mission Point Light during 2008. There is a fee, which benefits the light.

In 2008, the building opened for the first time to the public with a small museum after serving for many years as the park manager's residence. Today, the lighthouse has a very popular and unique keeper program. The weekly keepers run the gift shop from May through October and get to stay in the updated lighthouse keeper's quarters.

The area around the lighthouse attracts many cross country skiers. The location is becoming increasingly popular, which has subjected it to environmental issues that are being addressed by Peninsula Township.

The Old Mission Peninsula is said to be a premier place to sea kayak. Maps, rentals, and guided tours are available.

Mission Point is visited by about 100,000 people annually.

== Gallery ==
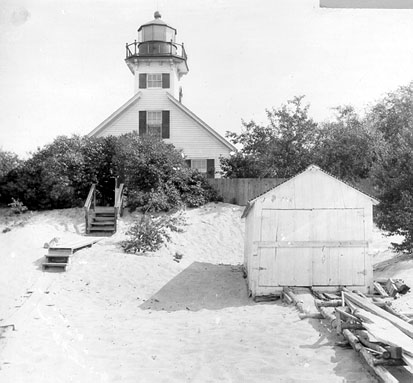
Vintage image of the lighthouse

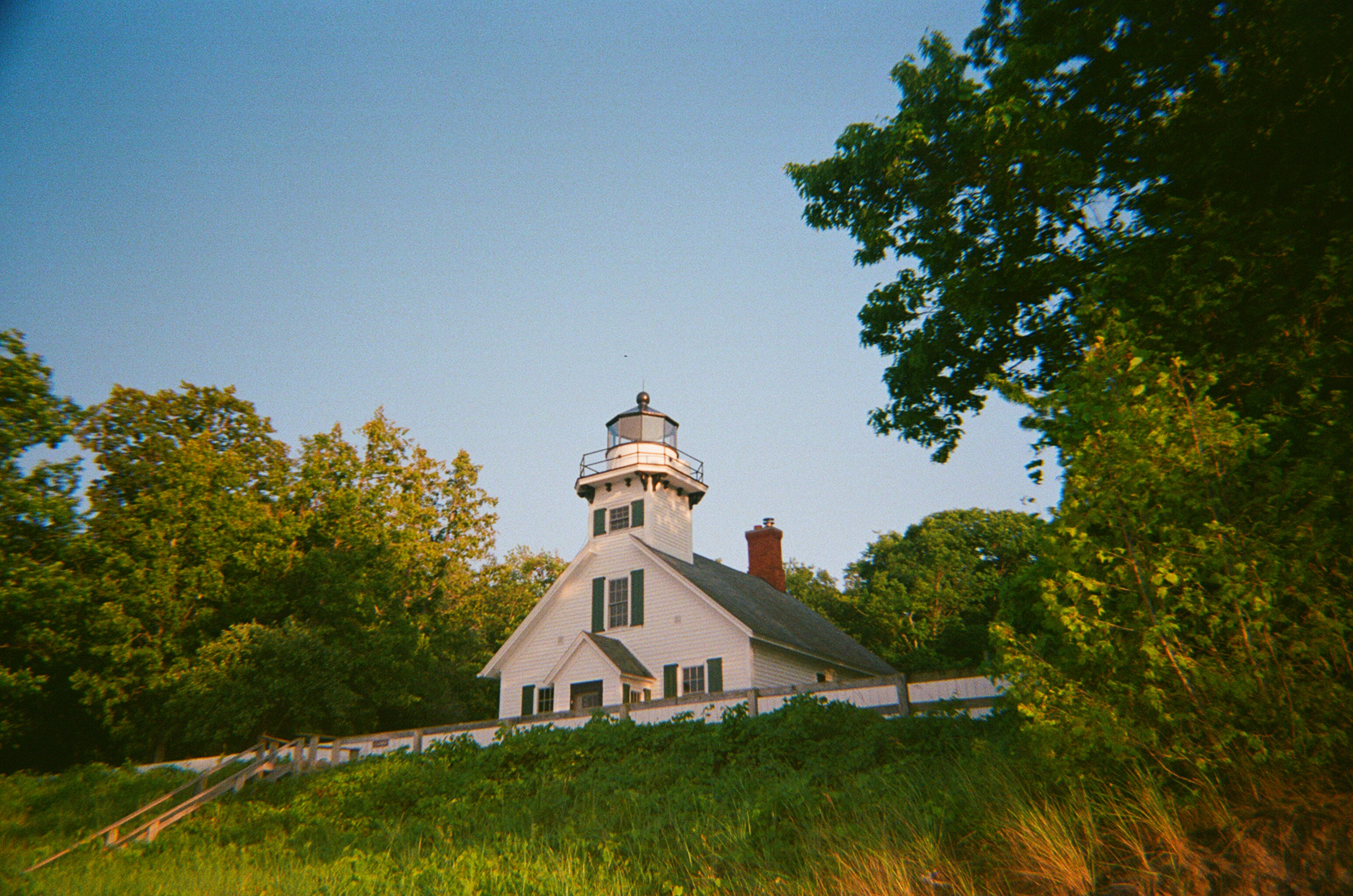
The lighthouse from the beach in August 2023

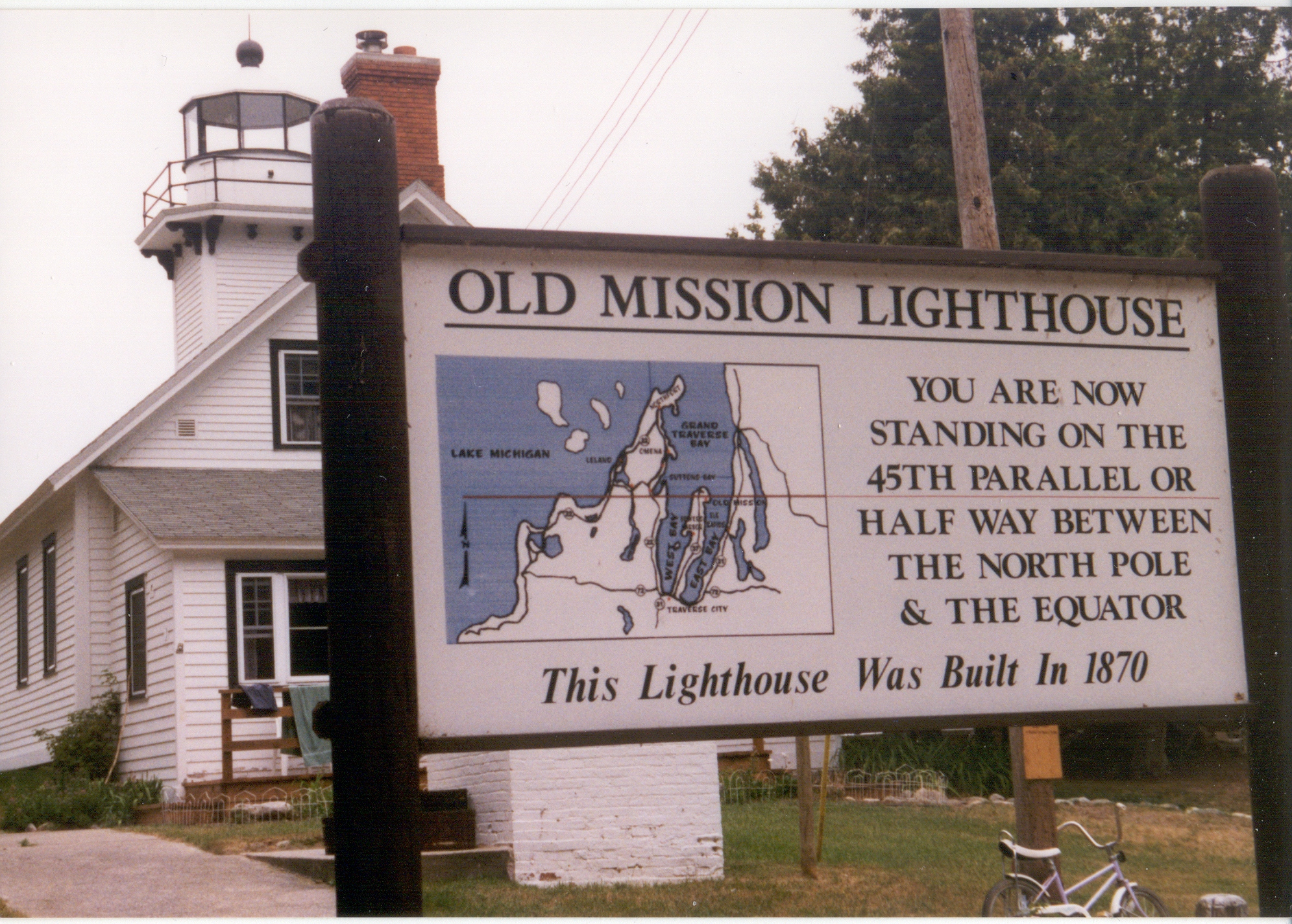
Sign adjacent to the lighthouse

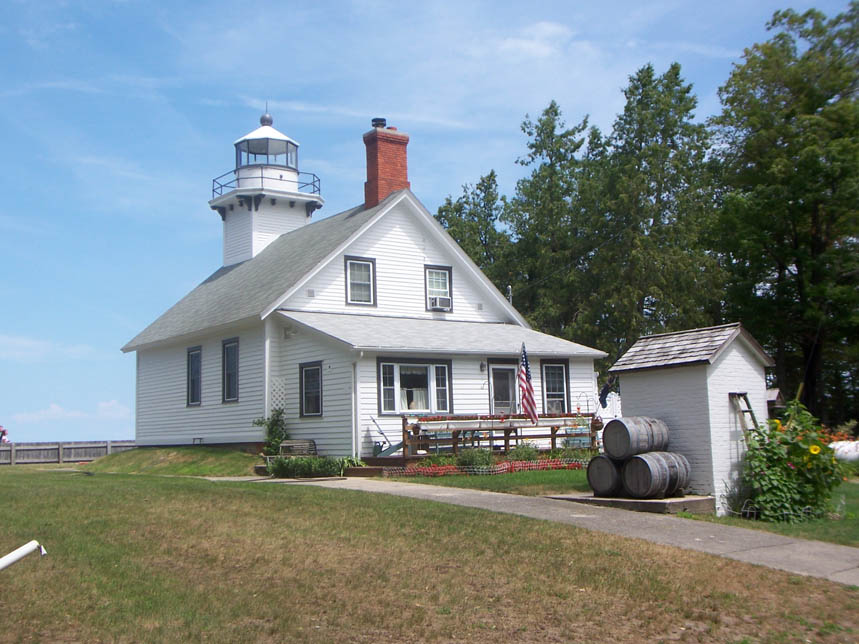
Rear of the lighthouse in July 2006

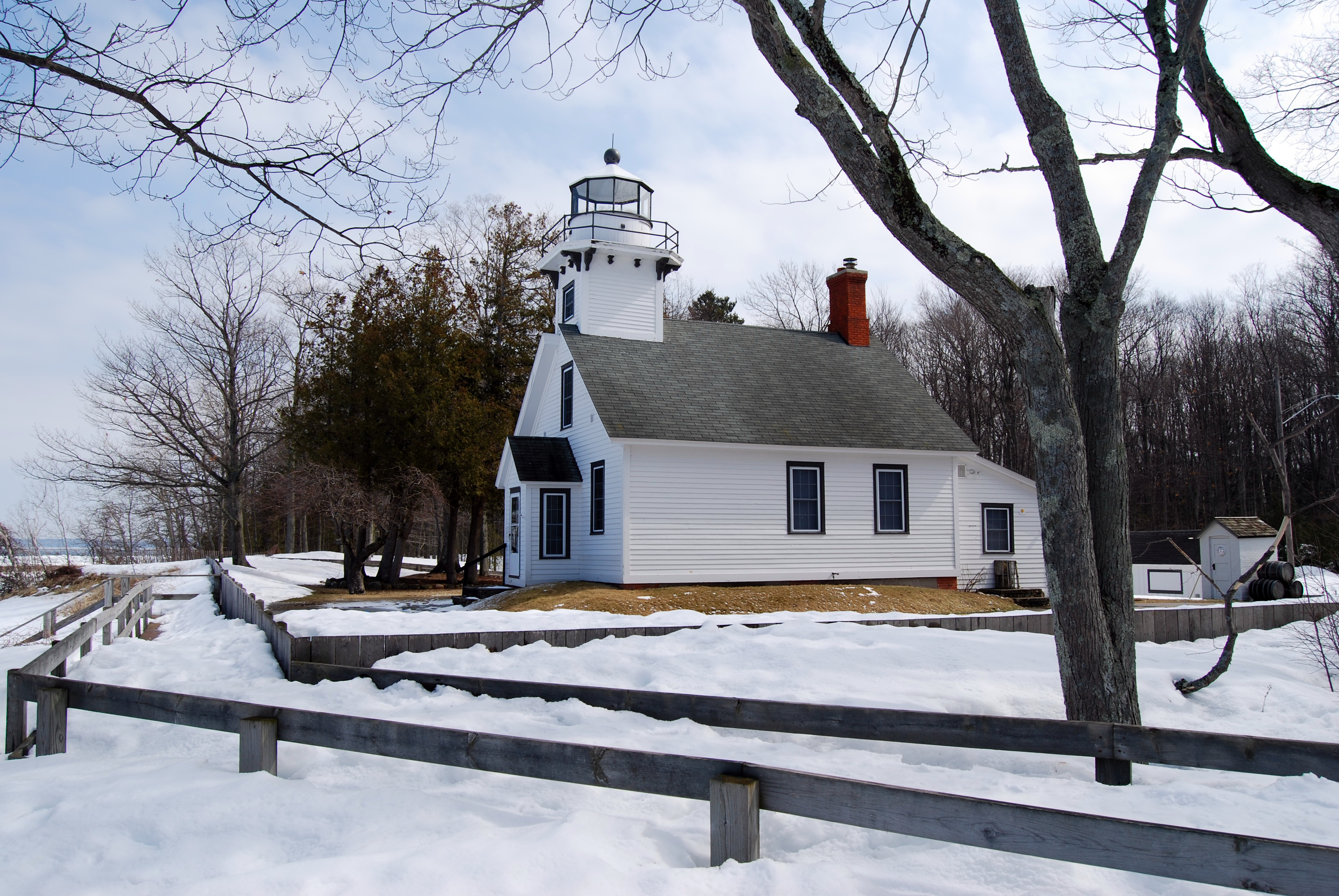
The lighthouse in winter of 2009

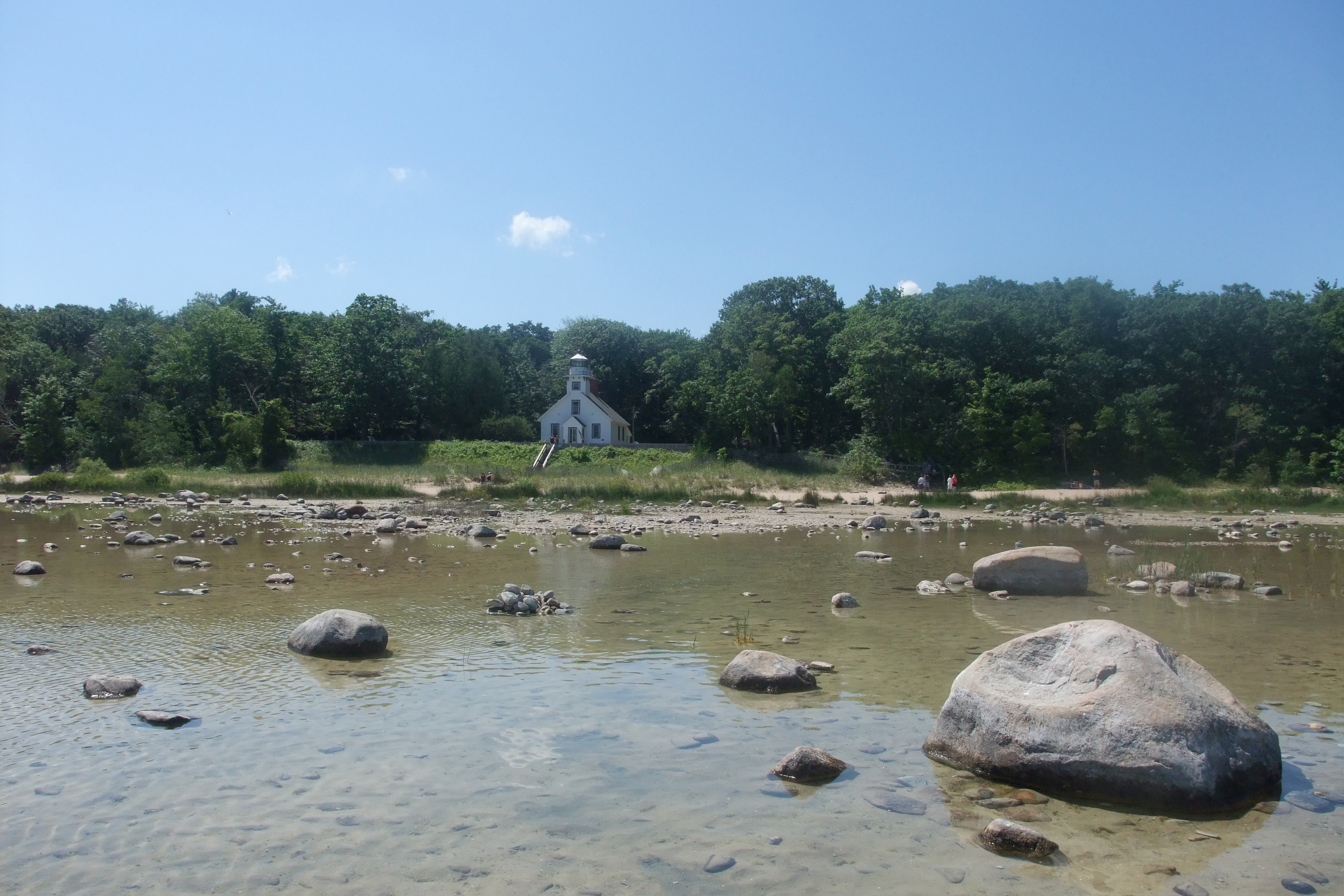
The lighthouse from the water in July 2010

== See also ==
- Lighthouses in the United States

== Bibliography ==
- Bibliography on Michigan lighthouses.
- Crompton, Samuel Willard & Michael J. Rhein, The Ultimate Book of Lighthouses (2002) ISBN 1-59223-102-0; ISBN 978-1-59223-102-7.
- Hyde, Charles K., and Ann and John Mahan. The Northern Lights: Lighthouses of the Upper Great Lakes. Detroit: Wayne State University Press, 1995. ISBN 0-8143-2554-8 ISBN 978-0-8143-2554-4.
- Jones, Ray & Bruce Roberts, American Lighthouses (Globe Pequot, September 1, 1998, 1st Ed.) ISBN 0-7627-0324-5; ISBN 978-0-7627-0324-1.
- Jones, Ray,The Lighthouse Encyclopedia, The Definitive Reference (Globe Pequot, January 1, 2004, 1st ed.) ISBN 0-7627-2735-7; ISBN 978-0-7627-2735-3.
- Noble, Dennis, Lighthouses & Keepers: U. S. Lighthouse Service and Its Legacy (Annapolis: U. S. Naval Institute Press, 1997). ISBN 1-55750-638-8; ISBN 978-1-55750-638-2.
- Oleszewski, Wes, Great Lakes Lighthouses, American and Canadian: A Comprehensive Directory/Guide to Great Lakes Lighthouses, (Gwinn, Michigan: Avery Color Studios, Inc., 1998) ISBN 0-932212-98-0.
- Penrod, John, Lighthouses of Michigan, (Berrien Center, Michigan: Penrod/Hiawatha, 1998) ISBN 978-0-942618-78-5 ISBN 978-1-893624-23-8.
- Penrose, Laurie and Bill, A Traveler's Guide to 116 Michigan Lighthouses (Petoskey, Michigan: Friede Publications, 1999). ISBN 0-923756-03-5 ISBN 978-0-923756-03-1
- Pepper, Terry. "Seeing the Light: Lighthouses on the western Great Lakes".
- Putnam, George R., Lighthouses and Lightships of the United States, (Boston: Houghton Mifflin Co., 1933).
- United States Coast Guard, Aids to Navigation, (Washington, DC: U. S. Government Printing Office, 1945).
- Price, Scott T. "U. S. Coast Guard Aids to Navigation: A Historical Bibliography". United States Coast Guard Historian's Office.
- Wagner, John L. "Beacons Shining in the Night: The Lighthouses of Michigan". Clarke Historical Library, Central Michigan University.
- Wagner, John L., Michigan Lighthouses: An Aerial Photographic Perspective, (East Lansing, Michigan: John L. Wagner, 1998) ISBN 1-880311-01-1 ISBN 978-1-880311-01-1.
- Wargin, Ed, Legends of Light: A Michigan Lighthouse Portfolio (Ann Arbor Media Group, 2006). ISBN 978-1-58726-251-7.
- Wright, Larry and Wright, Patricia, Great Lakes Lighthouses Encyclopedia Hardback (Erin: Boston Mills Press, 2006) ISBN 1-55046-399-3.
