= Power Island =

Island in Lake Michigan, US

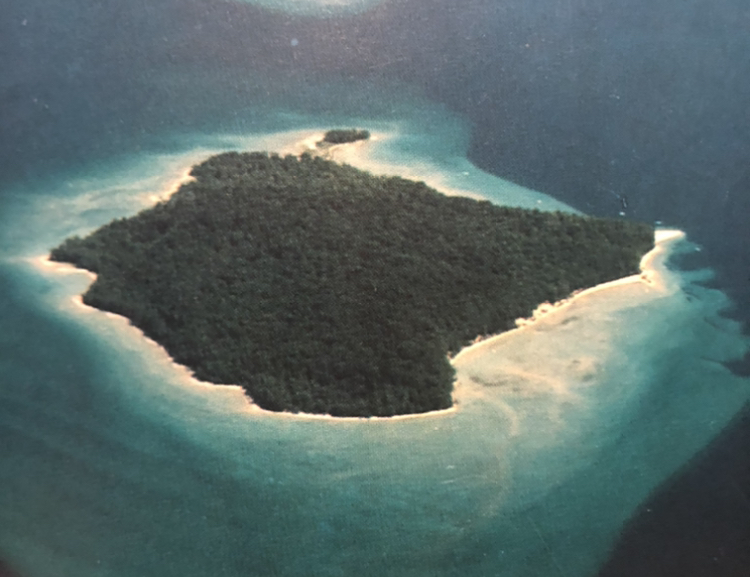
- Power Island from the southwest.

Geography
- Location: Peninsula Township, Grand Traverse County, Michigan
- Coordinates: 44°51′56″N 85°34′37″W
- Adjacent to: Grand Traverse Bay
- Area: 200.04 acres (80.95 ha)
- Coastline: 3 mi (5 km)
- Highest elevation: 667.2 ft (203.36 m)

Administration
- United States

Demographics
- Population: 1 (in summer)

Power Island (formerly Marion Island) is an island in Lake Michigan in the U.S. state of Michigan. Part of Grand Traverse County, Power Island is located in the west arm of Grand Traverse Bay, between the Leelanau Peninsula (west) and Old Mission Peninsula (east). The island was once owned and operated by Henry Ford.

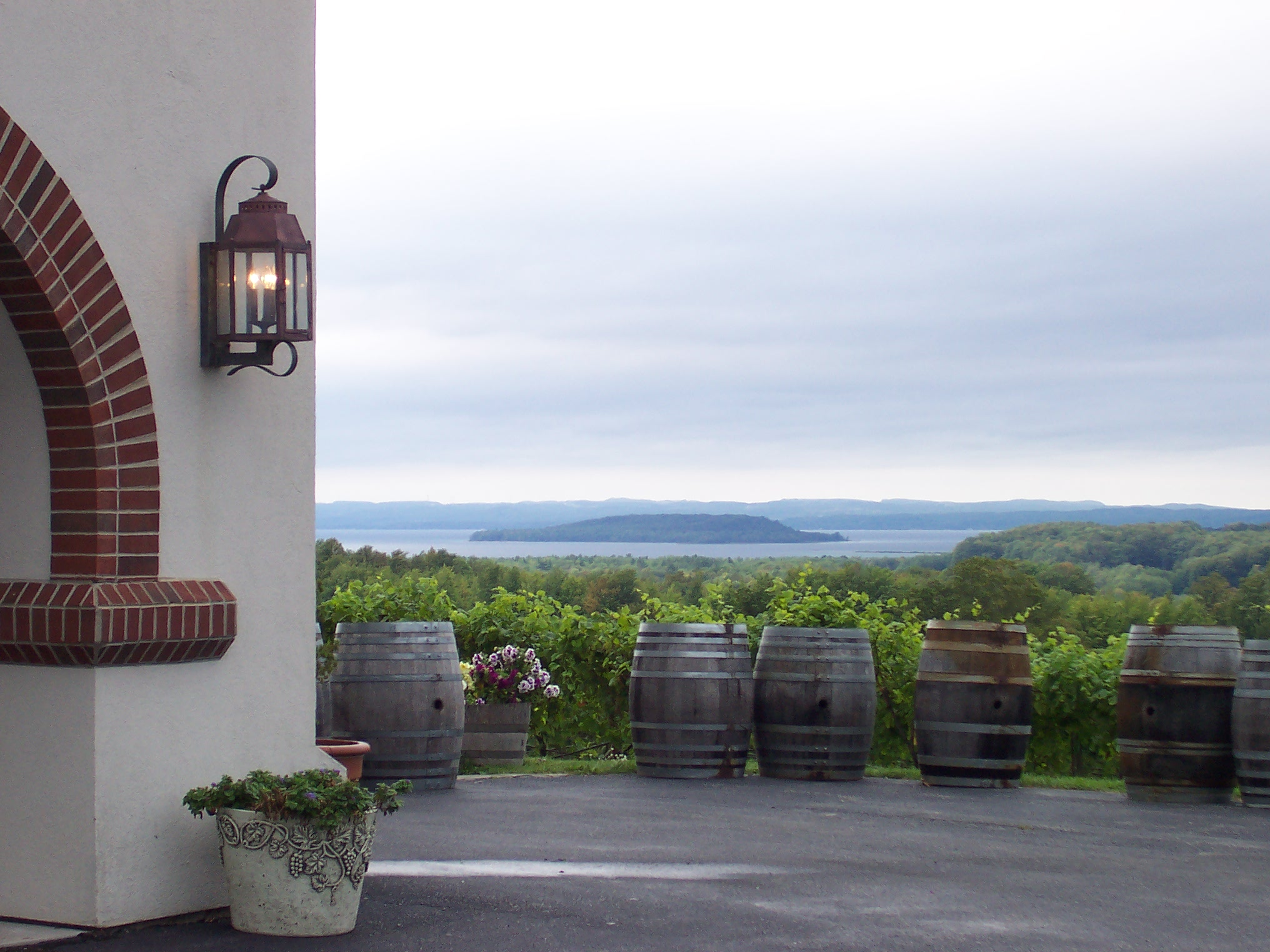
Power Island from Chateau Chantal on the Old Mission Peninsula.

== History ==
=== Early history ===
The first recorded mention of Power Island was by Andrew Blackbird. In the late 1800s, Blackbird wrote that there was a small island to the west of the Old Mission Peninsula. He wrote that the island was originally under the territory of the Odawa, but was later handed over to the Ojibwe to settle a conflict. Another early mention of the island was by Henry Schoolcraft, who visited the region in 1837, and noted Power Island, as well as Bowers Harbor.

In 1850, the island came to be known as Island No. 10 on official maps of the region. In 1852, the island was surveyed by Orange Risdon, who described it as "handsomely situated for a retired farm". Later, a man named McKinley Wilson became the first European resident of the island, sometime in the early 1850s. However, he only stayed for two years, and left the island. In 1854, James Strang, self-proclaimed "King of Beaver Island', noted that the island was "beautiful" and "large enough for a settlement". After Strang's death, a number of Mormons from Beaver Island took Strang's word and moved to Bowers Harbor, the nearest settlement to the island.

As more settlers visited the island, it soon became colloquially known as Hawk Island or Eagle Island owing to the number of bald eagles and crows inhabiting the island. In the 1860s, the United States Government renamed the island to Harbor Island. Locals began to also term the island Hog Island, due to the number of hogs from the mainland that were taken to the island to feast on local flora.

=== Later history ===
In 1872, the Hall family of Ionia had purchased the island from its previous owners. The family disliked the name Hog Island, and opted to change it, honoring their youngest daughter with the new name Marion Island. At age 38, Marion Hall Fowler became owner of the island herself.

In 1917, Henry Ford bought the island from Hall, and thus changed the name again to Ford Island. Henry Ford reportedly brought close friends to vacation on his island, including Harvey S. Firestone, Thomas Edison, Babe Ruth, Woodrow Wilson, Warren G. Harding, and Theodore Roosevelt.

In 1944, the island was sold to the Rennies of the Rennie Oil Company, and was thusly renamed to Rennie Island. Locally, though, the island was still referred to as "Marion Island".

In 1987, the island was given to Grand Traverse County, and became a public park. The island was named to Power Island after Eugene Power, a Traverse City native and frequent visitor to the island.

Power Island is home to a sole resident, Fred Tank, who serves as the "keeper" of Power Island in summer.

== Geography ==
The approximately 200-acre Power Island is known for being a roughly shaped island. On all sides there is a flatter beach, but there is a larger hill in the island's center. The land is covered in a maple-beech forest.

Power Island is part of the greater landmass of the Old Mission Peninsula,

=== Bassett Island ===
Bassett Island is a small island just a few meters north of Power Island, connected during periods of low lake levels by a small isthmus. Today, some small campsites are on the island. In its past, the island has been known as Squaw Island and the Island of Dread, in reference to a local myth about it being haunted by a Native American spirit.

== Recreation ==
The waters surrounding are known for being a clear, Caribbean blue. These make the island a popular fishing, kayaking, swimming, and boating destination. The central hill of the island boasts a five-mile (8.0 km) hiking and walking path. The island campsite is a popular summer activity. Other popular activities include birding, hunting, nature watching, dog walking, and picnicking.

Boats travelling to the island typically leave from either Bower Harbor Marina (in Bowers Harbor, three miles [4.8 km] east) or Clinch Park Marina (in Traverse City, 6.5 miles [10.5 km] south).

== Sources ==
- Kathleen Craker Firestone, An Island in Grand Traverse Bay
