= Omena, Michigan =

- Census-designated place (CDP) & unincorporated community
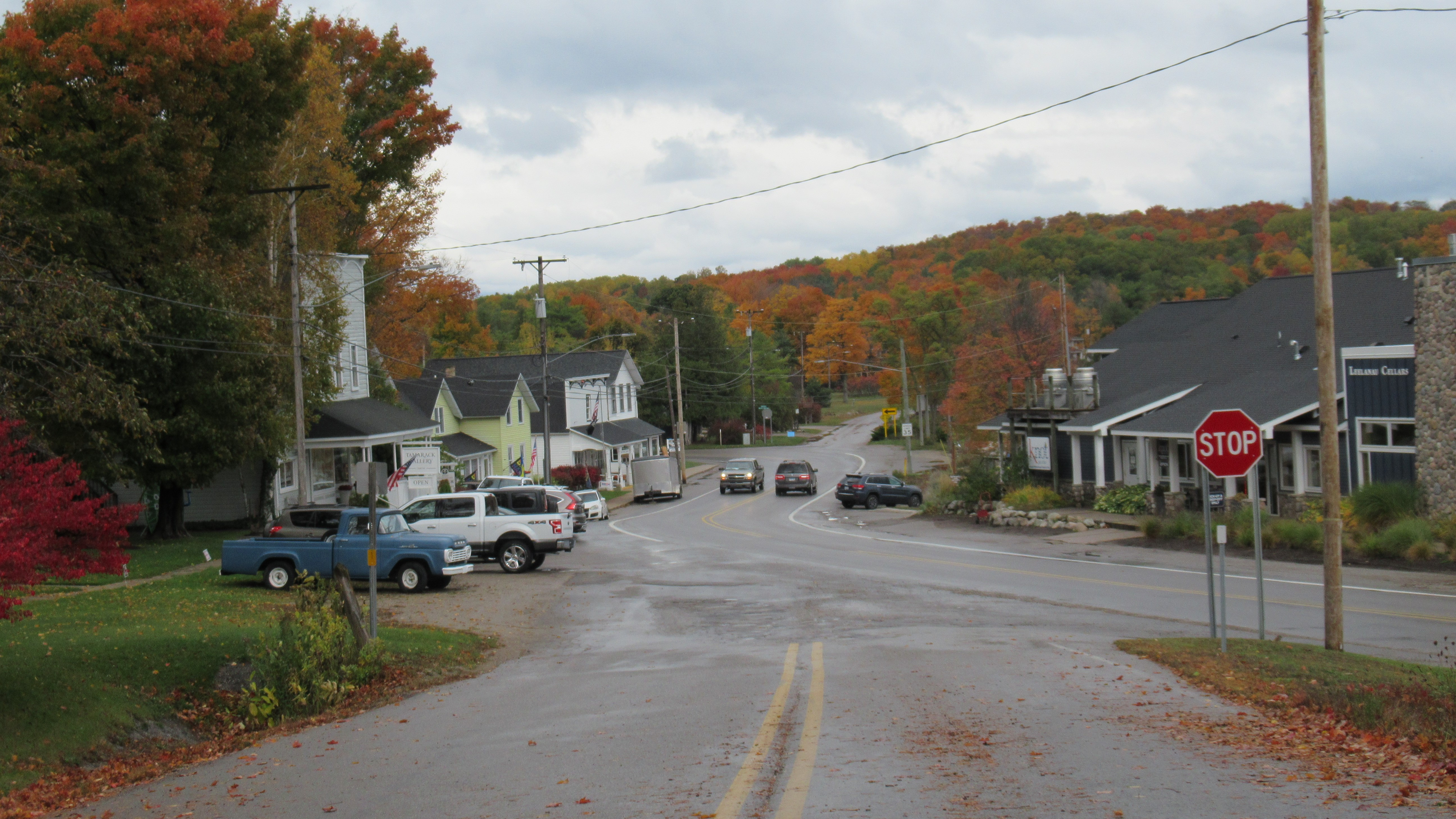
- Looking northeast along M-22

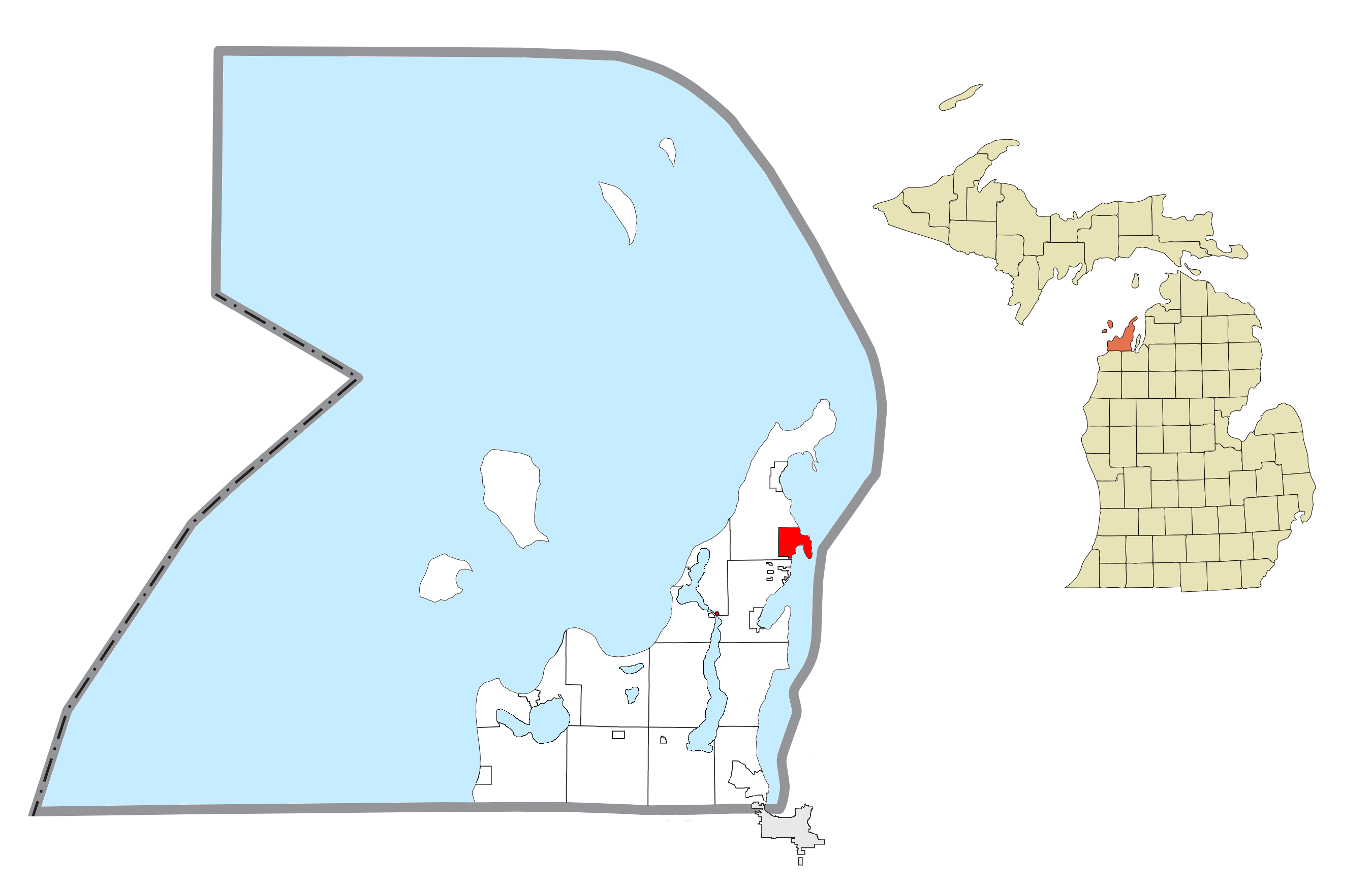
- Location within Leelanau County

- Location in Michigan Location in the United States
- Coordinates: 45°03′20″N 85°35′20″W
- Country: United States
- State: Michigan
- County: Leelanau
- Township: Leelanau

Area
  - Total: 4.57 sq mi (11.83 km^{2})
  - Land: 4.52 sq mi (11.70 km^{2})
  - Water: 0.050 sq mi (0.13 km^{2})
- Elevation: 604 ft (184 m)

Population (2020)
  - Total: 295
  - Density: 65/sq mi (25.2/km^{2})
- Time zone: UTC-5 (EST)
  - Summer (DST): UTC-4 (EDT)
- ZIP code(s): 49674
- Area code: 231
- FIPS code: 26-60640
- GNIS feature ID: 634055

Historical population
Census	Pop.	Note	%±
2010	267		—
2020	295		10.5%
U.S. Decennial Census

Omena (/oʊˈmiːnə/ oh-MEE-nə) is a small unincorporated community and census-designated place (CDP) in Leelanau Township of Leelanau County in the U.S. state of Michigan. As of the 2020 census it had a population of 295. Overlooking Omena Bay, on the western side of Grand Traverse Bay, Omena is home to wineries and farms including a thriving organic farming movement that includes cherries and hops. The area has several wineries featuring some of the region's cherry and grape crop, for which the Grand Traverse and Leelanau areas are known. The nearest substantial city is Traverse City, 23 miles (37 km) to the south.

== History ==
In 1852, the Rev. Peter Daugherty relocated an Indian mission from Old Mission on the Old Mission Peninsula across the western arm of the Grand Traverse Bay to what was at first called "New Mission". He (built) a small Presbyterian church there as the nucleus of the community. The church continues an active schedule of services during the summer months.

It was a stop on the Grand Rapids and Indiana Railroad and was regarded as a summer resort area. Among others, Benjamin Grierson, a U.S. Civil War general, had a summer home in Omena, as did General Byron Cutcheon.

=== Etymology ===
Omena is derived from an Ojibwe expression, "o-me-nah", meaning "is it so?"

== Geography ==
Omena is in northeastern Leelanau County on the west side of Grand Traverse Bay, an arm of Lake Michigan. It is served by one state highway, M-22, which leads south 23 miles (37 km) to Traverse City and north 5 miles (8 km) to Northport.

According to the U.S. Census Bureau, the Omena CDP has a total area of 4.6 square miles (11.8 km^{2}), of which 4.5 square miles (11.7 km^{2}) are land and 0.05 square miles (0.13 km^{2}), or 1.10%, are water.

== Mayoral elections ==
Omena is an unincorporated community and therefore lacks a centralized official government system. However, the citizens of Omena, Michigan practice triennial elections for a non-human mayor held by the Omena Historical Society. This was inspired by the canine mayoral elections of Rabbit Hash, Kentucky. The current four-legged mayor of Omena, elected in a competitive race in July 2024, is an American Quarter horse / Paint horse named Lucky Dinero Bosco. The election fundraiser attracted nineteen candidates, including dogs, cats, and an Angora goat as well as the top vote-getter. All candidates must live in the Omena area, but anyone can cast a ballot, and voters are encouraged to vote more than once or for more than one candidate if they so choose. The 2024 election raised $15,700 for the historical society.

Lucky Diablo Bosco's predecessor was Rosie Disch, a Golden mixed breed dog. The 2021 election raised $14,000 for the Omena Historical Society. Rosie was in office for a three-year term. Previous mayors are: Sweet Tart, the first feline mayor elected to the position from 2018; Polly Loveless, a tri-pod dog who died in office after winning the 2015 election; Maya Deibel, a dog who won the 2012 election; and Tucker Joyce, a dog who won the inaugural election in 2009.

== Notable people ==
- Benjamin Grierson, U.S. Cavalry general

== See also ==
- Grove Hill New Mission Church also known as the Omena Presbyterian Church
