= Glazier (surname) =

Glazier is a surname. Notable people with the surname include:

- Alan Glazier (1939–2020), retired English darts player
- Bill Glazier (born 1943), English professional footballer
- Frank Glazier (1934–1993), American football coach
- James A. Glazier (born 1962), American biophysicist, bioengineer, author, and educator
- Kenneth MacLean Glazier, Sr. (1912–1989), Canadian minister and librarian
- Loss Pequeño Glazier, American poet
- Mitch Glazier (born 1966), American lawyer and lobbyist
- Rick Glazier (born 1955), Democratic member of the North Carolina General Assembly
- Sidney Glazier (1916–2002), American film producer
- Stephen D. Glazier, American anthropologist
- Teresa Ferster Glazier (1907–2004), American nonfiction writer
- Wendy Glazier, Canadian actress

== See also ==
- Glasier, surname
- Glazer, surname
