= 2022 City of Chester by-election =

2022 by-election

- 1 December 2022

City of Chester constituency
- Turnout: 41.2% (▼30.5 pp)
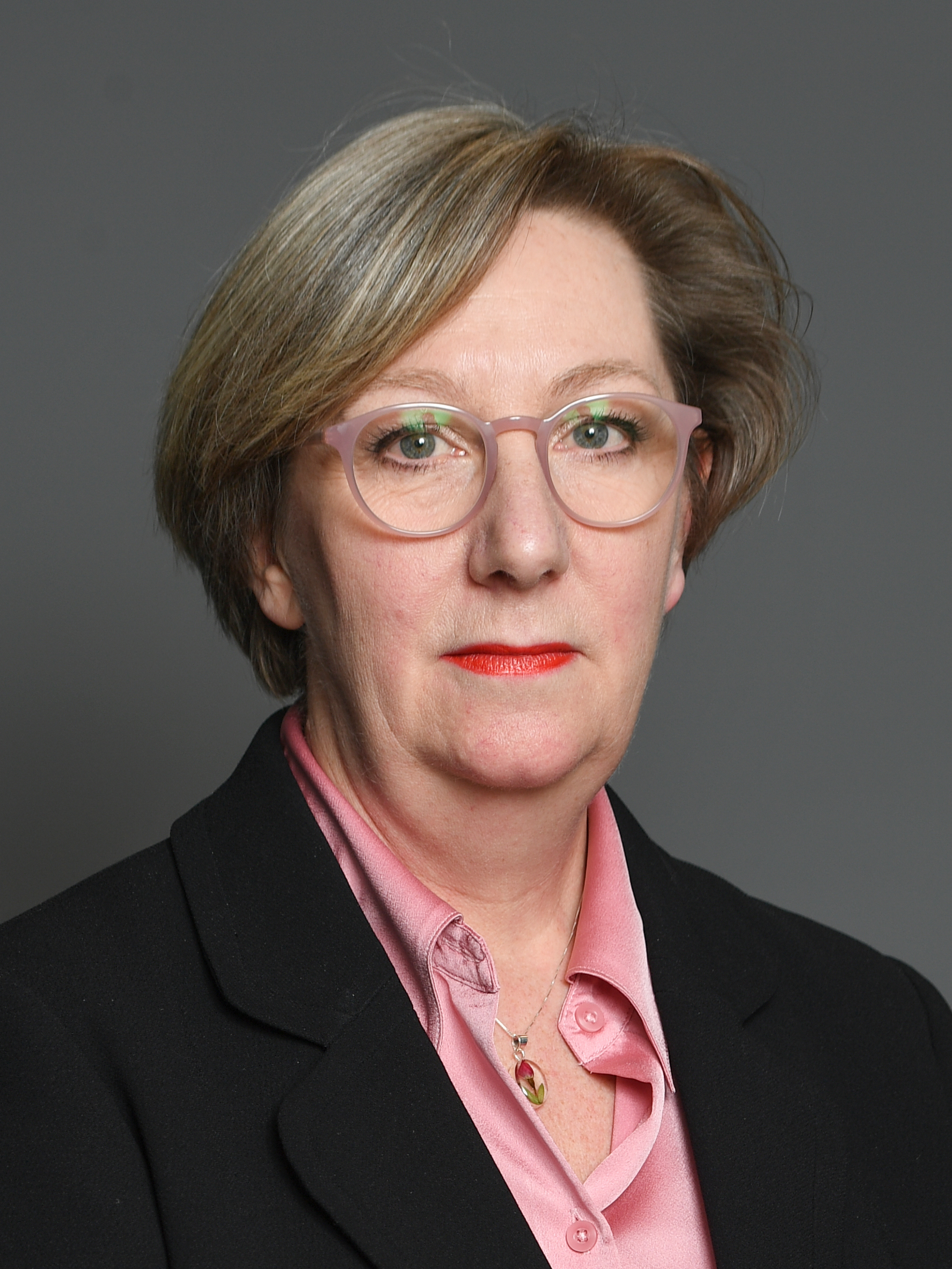
	First party	Second party	Third party
		Con	Lib
Candidate	Samantha Dixon	Liz Wardlaw	Rob Herd
Party	Labour	Conservative	Liberal Democrats
Last election	49.6%	38.3%	6.8%
Popular vote	17,309	6,335	2,370
Percentage	60.8%	22.2%	8.3%
Swing	▲11.2 pp	▼16.1 pp	▲1.5 pp
MP before election
Chris Matheson
Labour
Elected MP
Samantha Dixon
Labour

A by-election for the United Kingdom parliamentary constituency of City of Chester was held on 1 December 2022 following the resignation of incumbent Labour Party MP Chris Matheson. It was won by Samantha Dixon, also of Labour. The 14-point swing was Labour's best-ever result in the seat, and the worst result for the Conservative Party in Chester since 1837 (as its precursor, the Tories).

This was the first by-election to be held during both the reign of King Charles III and the premiership of Rishi Sunak.

== Background ==
The City of Chester constituency is one of the country's oldest, having elected members of parliament since 1545. The constituency is in western Cheshire, alongside Flintshire on the England–Wales border. The constituency covers the cathedral city of the same name and the surrounding rural areas. The constituency varies by social class, including middle-class areas such as Upton-by-Chester and the large rural former council estate of Blacon.

A Conservative safe seat for most of the 20th century, Chester elected its first Labour MP in the 1997 general election, when it was taken by librarian Christine Russell, who defeated TV personality and writer Gyles Brandreth. In 2010, she was unseated by Conservative Stephen Mosley, who served one term. Chris Matheson gained the seat from Mosley with a majority of 93 votes, having the third smallest majority of a parliamentary constituency in the UK in the 2015 general election. At the 2017 election, Matheson increased his majority from 93 to 9,176, turning Chester from a super-marginal seat into a relatively safe seat. Chester voted Remain by 54% to 46% in the 2016 EU referendum.

Matheson resigned on 21 October 2022, in response to the Independent Expert Panel's recommendation that he be suspended from the House of Commons for four weeks over allegations of "serious sexual misconduct" towards a junior member of staff. Following the findings, the Labour Party suspended his membership and withdrew the parliamentary whip. Matheson would have faced a recall from Parliament under the Recall of MPs Act 2015, but he announced his resignation shortly after news of the findings was made public. Matheson continued to deny any sexual misconduct, but said he felt obliged to resign for health and family reasons.

The writ was moved for holding the by-election in the House of Commons on 25 October 2022.

Libraries were made available as drop-off points for postal votes for the by-election until 30 November 2022.

== Candidates ==
On 29 October, the Conservatives confirmed that Liz Wardlaw, a councillor for Cheshire East Council's Odd Rode ward, would stand as their candidate in the by-election.

On 30 October, the Labour Party confirmed that former Cheshire West and Chester Council leader and current councillor Samantha Dixon would represent them, following a vote by local party members.

On 31 October, the Liberal Democrats announced Rob Herd, a Chester school teacher and parish councillor, as their candidate in the by-election.

The Green Party chose Paul Bowers as their candidate. He is a Cheshire West and Chester Councillor. Reform UK chose Jeanie Barton as their candidate.

Rejoin EU chose party leader Richard Hewison as their candidate. UKIP chose Cain Griffiths as their candidate. The Official Monster Raving Loony Party chose their party leader Howling Laud Hope as their candidate. The Freedom Alliance chose Chris Quartermaine as their candidate.

== Result ==
2022 City of Chester by-election
Party	Candidate	Votes	%	±%
Labour	Samantha Dixon	17,309	60.8	+11.2
Conservative	Liz Wardlaw	6,335	22.2	–16.1
Liberal Democrats	Rob Herd	2,370	8.3	+1.5
Green	Paul Bowers	987	3.5	+0.9
Reform	Jeanie Barton	773	2.7	+0.2
Rejoin EU	Richard Hewison	277	1.0	New
UKIP	Cain Griffiths	179	0.6	New
Monster Raving Loony	Howling Laud Hope	156	0.5	New
Freedom Alliance	Chris Quartermaine	91	0.3	New
Majority		10,974	38.6	+27.3
Total valid votes		28,475		
Rejected ballots		66		
Turnout		28,543	41.2	–30.5
Labour hold		Swing	+13.7	

== Previous result ==
General election 2019: City of Chester
Party	Candidate	Votes	%	±%
Labour	Chris Matheson	27,082	49.6	–7.2
Conservative	Samantha George	20,918	38.3	–2.2
Liberal Democrats	Bob Thompson	3,734	6.8	+4.1
Green	Nicholas Brown	1,438	2.6	New
Brexit Party	Andy Argyle	1,388	2.5	New
Majority		6,164	11.3	–5.0
Turnout		54,560	71.7	–5.7
Labour hold		Swing	–2.5	

== Reaction ==
Leader of the Labour Party Keir Starmer called the result "a clear message to Rishi Sunak". Deputy Leader Angela Rayner spoke to reporters in Chester with Dixon after the result. She said the "historic result" was due to the cost of living crisis. The Conservatives saw their lowest vote share in Chester since the 1832 general election, while Labour saw a 14 point swing towards them from the Conservatives, which, if projected nationally, would see Labour win a general election with a majority government. It was the Labour Party's best-ever result in the seat.
