= Robert Werden =

Robert Werden (c. 1622 – 23 January 1690), (Note: also spelt Robert Worden) was a Royalist officer during the English Civil War. After the Restoration, he served as an officer in the English Army, and was a Member of Parliament for Chester during most of the 1670s and 1680s.

== Biography ==
Werden was the son of John Werden of Chester (died 1646), and his wife Katherine, daughter of Edward Dutton, Governor of Barbados. He had at least one sister, Katherine (died 1683), who married Carey Dillon, 5th Earl of Roscommon and had issue.

On the eve of the English Civil War John Werden was appointed a commissioner of array for Cheshire. He exerted his influence in support of the royal cause, and his son Robert was named colonel of a troop of horse under Sir John Byron, 1st Baron Byron. Robert distinguished himself by his activity. He took part in the defence of Chester, but was wounded and taken prisoner in a skirmish on 18 January 1645. (Note: dates are in the Julian calendar with the start of year as 1 January (see Old Style and New Style dates).) His father assisted in the negotiations for the surrender of the town, and signed the articles of surrender on 3 February 1646.

On 26 March John Werden begged to be permitted to compound for his delinquency in being a commissioner of array, pleading that he had never acted against Parliament, and that he had been active in the surrender of Chester. The commissioners for compounding were moved by his representations, and, although he had not come in within the prescribed term, they only imposed on him the small fine of £600, "consideration being had of his great losses and kind offices to members of parliament". Their sentence was confirmed by the House of Commons of England on 9 July, Robert being included in the composition. On 21 July the county committee indignantly remonstrated, declaring Robert was "a most violent enemy, administering general astonishment and terror to the whole country". They were, however, too late; the house declined to recede from its former decision, and as John Werden had died about the close of 1646, Robert Werden was finally cleared by a draft ordinance of the House of Lords on 12 February 1647.

In 1648, Werden's estates were again sequestered on the suspicion that he harboured treasonable designs, a fifth being allowed his wife for maintenance. On 27 January 1652 they were discharged from sequestration, but in 1655 his fidelity was seen to be very doubtful, and in 1659 he took part in the Royalist rising under Sir George Booth. He was proclaimed a traitor and a rebel on 9 August, and his goods sequestered on 27 August. A few days earlier he was captured and sent to London for examination. He succeeded in making his peace with the Commonwealth, probably at the expense of the Royalists.

At the Restoration Werden was imprisoned on a charge of treason. Among other acts of treachery he was accused of endeavouring to secure the king's person after the Battle of Worcester (1651) and of betraying Booth in 1659. Booth and other Lancashire gentlemen, however, befriended him, and he finally obtained his pardon, received back his estates, and in 1662 was made a groom of the Duke of York's bedchamber, and was granted the lands of Thomas Wogan, the regicide, in Pembrokeshire. On 4 June 1665 he received the commission of lieutenant in the Duke of York's guards, and in May 1667 he was named a commissioner for regulating the Duke of Norfolk's affairs. On 29 June 1667 he was appointed lieutenant and major in the Duke of York's guards, and on 2 October 1672 was promoted to the rank of lieutenant and lieutenant-colonel.

On 10 February 1673 Werden was returned to parliament for Chester, retaining his seat until the dissolution in 1679. He was returned for the same city on 9 March 1684 – 1685 to the first parliament of James II. On 1 May 1678, he received the commission of brigadier of the horse, and in the summer served in Flanders expedition against the French. In 1679 he was appointed comptroller of the Duke of York's household. On the accession of James II he was promoted, on 19 June 1685, to the rank of "brigadier over all our forces", and on 31 July was appointed major-general. On 24 October he received the command of the regiment of horse now known as the 4th Dragoon Guards, and on 8 November 1688 attained the rank of lieutenant-general. On 15 September of that year, when the borough of Chester was remodelled by James, he was appointed a common councillor.

Notwithstanding the many benefits he received from James, Werden deserted him during the Glorious Revolution in 1688, and was rewarded by the post of treasurer to Queen Mary II. He died on 23 January 1690.

== Family ==
Werden was twice married: first, to Jane Backham; secondly, to Margaret Towse. With his first wife, he had John Werden (1640–1716) who became a politician and a baronet; Robert, a captain in the Royal Navy, who was killed fighting against the Dutch at the Battle of Solebay on 28 May 1673, while in command of HMS Henrietta, and Katherine, married to Richard Watts of Muchmunden in Hertfordshire.

== Notes ==
Parliament of England
Preceded by John Ratcliffe; Sir Thomas Smith, Bt	Member of Parliament for Chester; 1673–1679; With: Sir Thomas Smith, Bt 1673–1675; William Williams 1675–1679	Succeeded by William Williams; Sir Thomas Grosvenor, Bt
Preceded by William Williams; Roger Whitley	Member of Parliament for Chester; 1689–1690; With: Sir Thomas Grosvenor, Bt	Succeeded by George Mainwaring; Roger Whitley
