= Sir Thomas Smith, 1st Baronet, of Hatherton =

English politician

Sir Thomas Smith, 1st Baronet (ca. 1622 – 22 May 1675) was an English politician who sat in the House of Commons between 1661 and 1675.

Smith was the son of Sir Thomas Smith, of Hatherton, Cheshire and his wife Mary Smith, daughter of Sir Hugh Smith, of Long Ashton, Somerset. He was created baronet of Hatherton on 16 August 1660.

In 1661, Smith was elected Member of Parliament for Chester in the Cavalier Parliament and sat until his death in 1675.

Smith married Abigail Pate, daughter of Sir John Pate, Bt of Sysonby, Leicestershire. They had a daughter Frances, but no son. The baronetcy was inherited by his nephew Thomas and became extinct on his death.

Parliament of England
Preceded by John Ratcliffe; William Ince	Member of Parliament for Chester; 1661–1675; With: John Ratcliffe 1661–1673; Robert Werden 1673–1675	Succeeded by William Williams; Robert Werden
Baronetage of England
New creation	Baronet (of Hatherton); 1660–1675	Succeeded by Thomas Smith
