= Glasier =

Glasier is a surname. Notable people with this surname include:

- Hugh Glasier, English politician
- John Glasier, Canadian politician
- John Bruce Glasier, Scottish politician
- Katharine Glasier, British journalist
- William Glasier, English politician

== See also ==
- Glazier (surname)
