= Henry Cole (priest) =

English Roman Catholic churchman and academic

- Born: c. 1500; Godshill, Isle of Wight
- Died: c. 1579 or 1580; Fleet Prison, London
- Education: New College, Oxford (DCL)
- Occupations: Roman Catholic churchman and academic
- Years active: 1520s-1559
- Known for: Catholicism

Henry Cole (c. 1500 – c. 1579 or 1580 in Fleet Prison) was a senior English Roman Catholic churchman and academic.

== Early life ==
Cole was born in Godshill, Isle of Wight. He was educated at Winchester College and New College, Oxford, where he was admitted as a perpetual fellow there (1523), and received the degree of B.C.L. (1525). He then went to Italy for seven years, residing chiefly at Padua.

== Career ==
After his return from Italy, Cole began a rapid rise in the English church during the reign of Henry VIII. Successively he was the prebendary of Yetminster, Dorset (1539); rector of Chelmsford (1540); prebendary in London of Holborn, Sweting (1541) and Wenlakesbarn (1542); warden of New College, Oxford (1542–51), and rector of Newton Longueville in Buckinghamshire. In 1540 Cole was awarded a Doctor of Civil Law at Oxford but he resigned his fellowship the same year. As a result of the English Reformation, Cole initially conformed to Anglicanism, but returned to Catholicism in about 1547 resigning all his preferments (titles of religious office) in the newly-formed Church of England.

In July 1553, after the Catholic Mary I took the throne of England, Cole was given senior roles in the English Catholic Church. He became Archdeacon of Ely, a canon of Westminster (1554), a vicar-general of Primate of All England Cardinal Reginald Pole (1557), and a judge at the archiepiscopal Court of Audience at Canterbury Cathedral. This was an ecclesiastical court where the Archbishop of Canterbury exercised authority on behalf of the Pope. In the 17th century, it was superseded by the Court of Arches.

Cole was one of the commissioners who restored Cuthbert Tunstall and Edmund Bonner to their bishoprics, and was disputant against Thomas Cranmer, Nicholas Ridley, and Hugh Latimer at Oxford (1554). He preached the sermon on the occasion of Cranmer's burning in 1556, where he had "the job of explaining why a repentant sinner should still be burnt at the stake for heresy".

On 13 July 1554, Cole was appointed as Archdeacon of Ely and Provost of Eton College, a post which he had vacated by 5 July 1559. He was made Dean of St Paul's Cathedral in 1556, judge of Prerogative Court circa 1548-58 and dean of the arches in 1557/8.

He was a delegate for the visitation of Oxford (1556), and Visitor of All Souls College in 1558, in which year he received the rectory of Wrotham.

=== Final senior clerical role ===
In 1558, just months before the death of Mary I, Cardinal Pole commissioned Cole (as Dean of St Paul's Cathedral) to suppress the heresy of Protestantism in Ireland. During his journey to Dublin, he spent the night at a hostelry in Chester where he was visited by Lawrence Smith, the Mayor of Chester. Cole showed the mayor a leather box, which contained his letters of authority from Cardinal Pole, saying "Here is what will lash the heretics of Ireland!" This was overheard by the hostelry owner, a Mrs Mottershead, who had a brother in Dublin. Concerned for his safety, she surreptitiously replaced the commission letter with a pack of cards with the Knave of Clubs on top. Cole only discovered the deception when he opened the box to much surprise at an assembly in Dublin Castle in front of the Lord Deputy of Ireland Thomas Radclyffe and members of his Privy Council. He was told to go back to London immediately and only return when he had the correct letters of authority. However. Mary I died on his journey back. The Protestant queen, Elizabeth I, was said to be so impressed by Mrs Mottershead's ingenuity, she awarded her an annual pension of £40 (£15,000 in 2023).

== Death ==
Cole returned to England from Ireland shortly after Elizabeth I took the throne in November 1558. His benefactor, Cardinal Pole had also died in London, during an influenza epidemic on 17 November 1558 just 12 hours after Queen Mary's death. Pole appointed Cole as one of the executors of his Will.

Cole remained true to his Catholic faith despite the new queen immediately changing the country's religion back to Protestantism. He was part of the Catholic delegation which took part in the Westminster Conference in March 1559 which resulted in the authorisation of the 1559 Book of Common Prayer.

However the oppression of Catholicism in England had started. Only six weeks after the end of the conference, Cole was fined 500 marks for being a practising Catholic, deprived of all his Church preferments (ie titles, positions, prestige), and sent to the Tower of London on 20 May 1560. A month later he was moved to Fleet Prison on 10 June where he remained for the next twenty years until his death c. 1579-80.

== Works ==
He wrote:

- Letters to Dr. Starkey and Sir Richard Morison (or Morysin) from Padua, 1530, and Paris, 1537;
- "Disputation with Cranmer, Ridley and Latimer at Oxford", in Foxe's "Acts and Monuments";
- "Sum and effect of his sermon at Oxford when Archbishop Cranmer was burnt", in Foxe's "Acts and Monuments";
- "Answer to the first proposition of the Protestants at the disputation before the Lords at Westminster 1559", in Burnet's "Hist. Reform. Records";
- "Copie of a Sermon at Paule's Crosse 1560" (London, 1560);
- "Letters to John, Bishop of Sarum" (London, 1560);
- "Answers to certain parcels of the Letters of the Bishop of Sarum", in John Jewel's works.
