= Jane Ratcliffe =

Exemplar of godly life

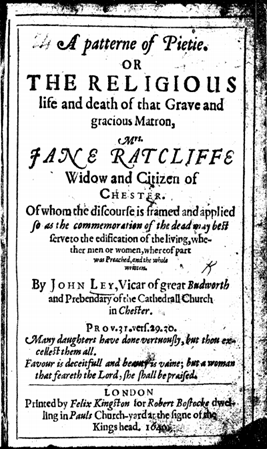
- Born: 1500s
- Died: 17 August 1638; London

Jane Ratcliffe born Jane Brereton (died 1638) was an examplar of a godly life. She lived in Chester where her husband and later son were leading citizens. John Ley published an account of her life as "A Patterne of Pietie".

== Life ==
Her date of birth is unknown but her mother died in 1592 and her father died in 1599. She was the daughter of Mary Parrey of Flintshire and John Brerewood of Chester. Her brother was born in 1588 and he became a judge and was knighted to become Sir Robert Brerewood. Her uncle, Edward Brerewood, was a Puritan professor at Gresham College.

John Ratcliffe's wife died in 1602. She married Ratcliffe as his second wife. John was the member of parliament and he was twice the a Sheriff of Chester in 1590 and in 1601/2.

In about 1610 their first child died and she turned to a leading clergyman Nicholas Byfield and, from then, led a godly life. Meanwhile, her husband was Mayor of Chester in 1611–12 and in 1628–29. She was said to have a "loving obedience" to John Ley, but it was noted that she was more enthusiastic for the Puritan church that she was and this dissonance with her husband was not thought ungodly by her church. Her husband died in 1633 and she then managed his brewery business. They had at least two children. John Ratliffe junior was a Sheriff to his father and an MP in 1646 and a daughter also married.

She died in London in 1638. In 1640 John Ley who was a clergyman and member of the Westminster Assembly published A Patterne of Pietie, or the Religious life and death of that grave and gracious Matron, Mrs. Jane Ratcliffe, Widow, and Citizen of Chester, 1640. It was addressed by Ley to Brilliana, Lady Harley and Alice, Lady Lucy and it has been noted that Ley's tribute was self-serving. He used his description of Ratcliffe's life to support his views on religion.
