= List of mayors of Chester =

Lord Mayor of Chester
- Incumbent; Sheila Little since 2023
- Style: The Right Worshipful
- Appointer: Cheshire West and Chester Council
- Term length: One municipal year
- Formation: 1992
- Salary: None
- Website: Official website

The position of Lord Mayor of Chester was created on 10 March 1992 when the dignity was conferred on the city of Chester, England by Letters Patent as part of celebrations of 40th anniversary of the accession of Queen Elizabeth II. Prior to that the position had been that of Mayor of Chester. The Lord Mayoralty was given to Chester in recognition of its historical and economic importance. In 2009 the role of Lord Mayor of Chester was combined with that of Chairman of Cheshire West and Chester Council, but the two roles were separated again in 2015.

The full title of the Mayor is 'The Right Worshipful, the Lord Mayor of the City of Chester'.

== Notable Mayors ==
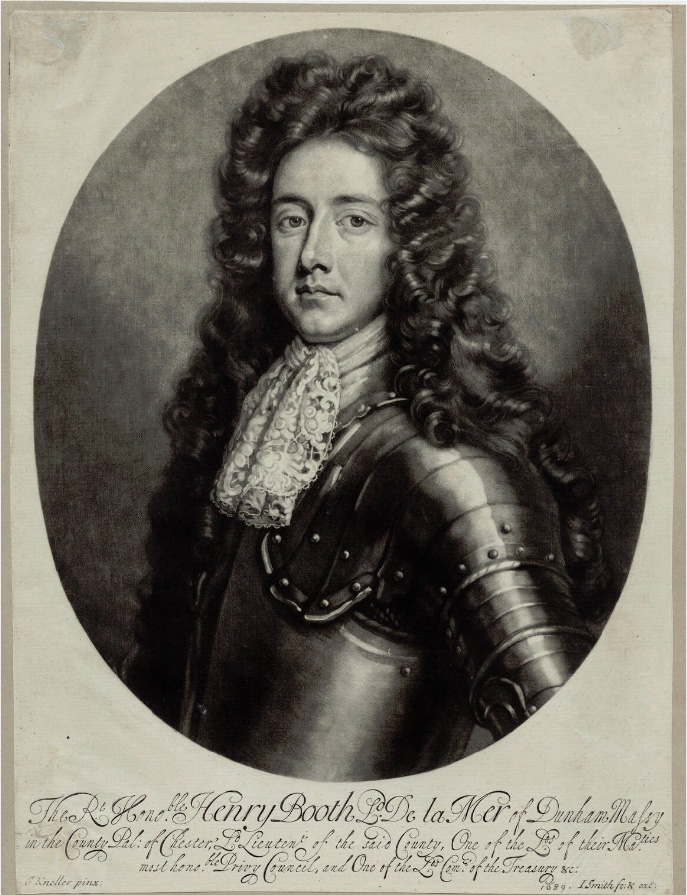
Henry Booth, Earl of Warrington. Mayor 1691

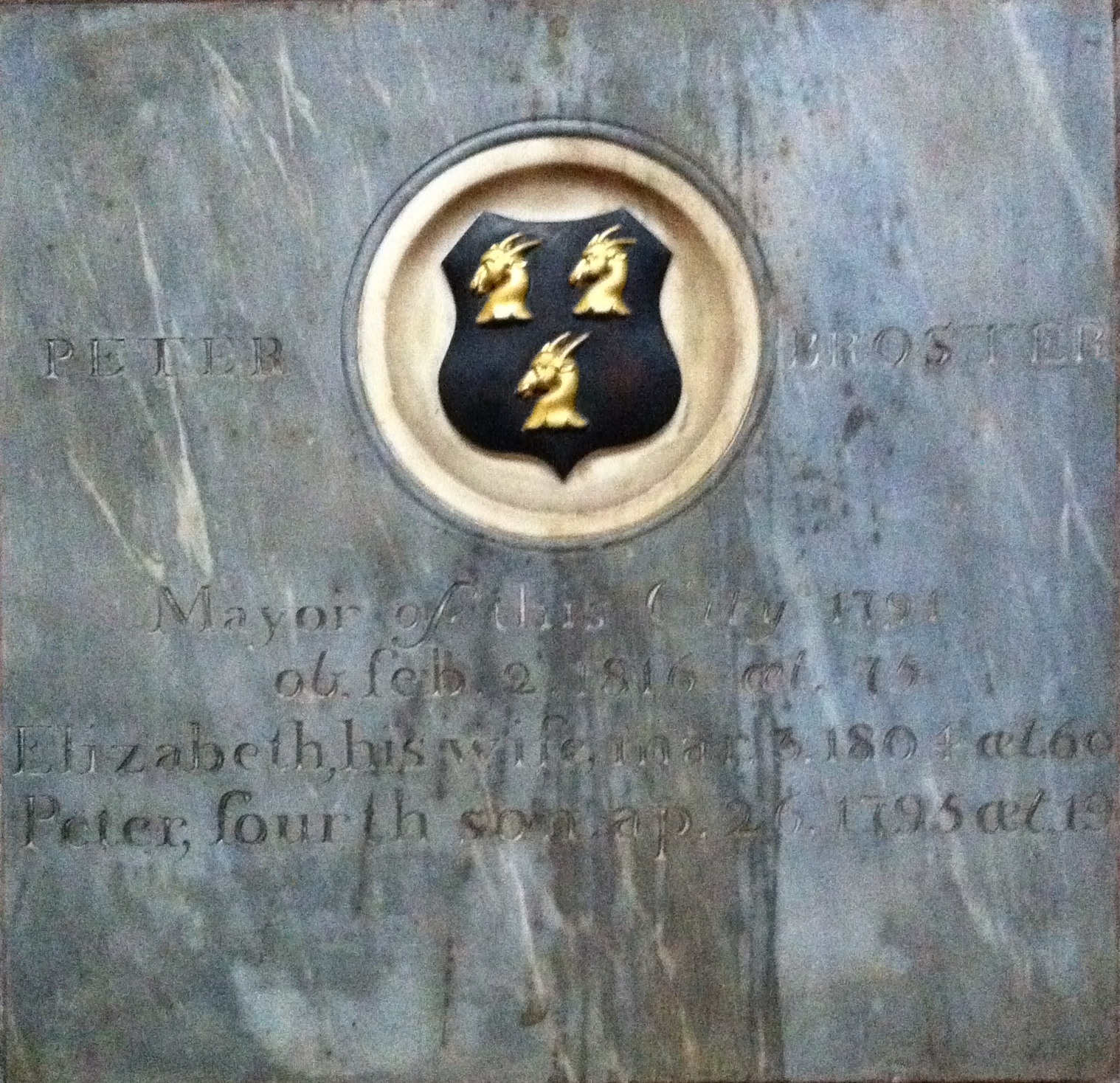
Peter Broster, mayor of Chester

- 1484-85: Sir John Savage (Knight of the Garter)
- 1512–14: Sir Piers Dutton (High Sheriff of Cheshire, 1542)
- 1540: Sir Lawrence Smith (MP for Cheshire, 1545)
- 1558: Sir Lawrence Smith (MP for Cheshire, 1545)
- 1560: William Aldersey (MP for Chester, 1547)
- 1563: Sir Lawrence Smith (MP for Cheshire, 1545)
- 1570: Sir Lawrence Smith (MP for Cheshire, 1545)
- 1572: John Hankey (Sheriff, 1557. Alderman, 1567)
- 1581: Richard Bavand (MP for Chester, 1584)
- 1600: Richard Bavand (MP for Chester, 1584)
- 1602: Hugh Glasier (MP for Chester, 1601)
- 1611: John Ratcliffe (MP for Chester, 1621)
- 1622: Thomas Smith (MP for Chester, 1640–1644)
- 1628: John Ratcliffe (MP for Chester, 1621)
- 1642: William Ince (MP for Chester, 1660)
- 1681: George Mainwaring
- 1684: Sir Thomas Grosvenor, Bt (MP for Chester, 1679–1700) (High Sheriff of Cheshire, 1688)
- 1691: Henry Booth, 1st Earl of Warrington (MP for Cheshire, 1678–85)
- 1692–96: Roger Whitley (MP for Chester, 1681)
- 1715: Sir Richard Grosvenor, 4th Baronet (MP for Chester, 1715–33)
- 1737; Sir Watkin Williams-Wynn, MP for Denbighshire 1716–1741;
- 1738: Sir Robert Grosvenor, 6th Baronet (MP for Chester, 1733–55)
- 1902–03: Dr. John Roberts, Liberal

== List of Lord Mayors ==
- 1991–92: Susan Proctor (First Lord Mayor)
- 1992–93: John F Randall
- 1993–94: Margaret A Byatt
- 1994–95: J Gordon Smith
- 1995–96: Richard T Short
- 1996–97: Lilian G Price
- 1997–98: David J Evans
- 1998–99: David Nield
- 1999–2000: C. Eric Plenderleath
- 2000–01: Reginald F Jones
- 2001–02: Graham S Proctor
- 2002–03: Brian Crowe
- 2003–04: Barry Cowper
- 2004–05: Terry Ralph
- 2005–06: Mike Jones
- 2006–07: Sandra Rudd
- 2007–08: James Latham
- 2008–09: Brian Bailey
- 2009–10: John Ebo
- 2010–11: Neil Ritchie
- 2011–12: Eleanor Johnson
- 2012–13: Pamela Booher
- 2013–14: Jill Houlbrook
- 2014–15: Bob Rudd
- 2015–16: Hugo Deynem
- 2016–17: Angela Claydon
- 2017–18: Razia Daniels
- 2018–19: Alex Black
- 2019–20: Mark Williams
- 2020–21: Mark Williams
- 2021–22: Martyn Delaney
- 2022–23: John Leather
- 2023–24: Sheila Little
