= William Ince =

William Ince may refer to:

- William Ince (cabinet maker) (?–1804), English cabinet maker with John Mayhew, as Ince and Mayhew
- William Ince (theologian) (1825–1910), British theologian
- William Ince (MP), MP for Chester, 1660–1661
- William Ince (priest), provost of St John's Cathedral, Oban
