= Philip Stapleton Humberston =

British politician (1812–1891)

Member of Parliament for City of Chester
- In office 30 April 1859 – 12 July 1865 Serving with Hugh Grosvenor
- Preceded by: Enoch Salisbury; Hugh Grosvenor
- Succeeded by: William Henry Gladstone; Hugh Grosvenor

Personal details
- Born: 1812
- Died: 16 January 1891 (aged 78)
- Party: Conservative

Philip Stapleton Humberston (1812 – 16 January 1891) was a British Conservative politician.

Humberston was elected Conservative MP for City of Chester at the 1859 general election and held the seat until 1865 when he did not seek re-election.

Parliament of the United Kingdom
Preceded by Enoch Salisbury; Hugh Grosvenor	Member of Parliament for City of Chester; 1859–1865; With: Hugh Grosvenor	Succeeded by William Henry Gladstone; Hugh Grosvenor
