= William Glasier =

16th-century English politician

William Glasier (c. 1525 – 1588), of Chester and Lea-by-Backford, Cheshire, was an English politician.

== Family ==
Glasier was the eldest son of William Glasier from the Isle of Man, who became Mayor of Chester for 1551–2, and his wife Jane née Fletcher. He was educated at the Inner Temple. Glasier married twice: firstly to Elizabeth Aglionby, by whom he had two daughters and two sons, including Hugh Glasier, MP for Chester. His second wife was named Alice.

== Career ==
He was a Member (MP) of the Parliament of England for St Ives in 1563 and in Chester in 1571 and 1572. He was mayor of Chester in 1602–3.
