= John Bingley (MP) =

English politician and official, working in Ireland

Sir John Bingley (c.1572–1638) was an English politician and Crown official, who spent much of his career in Ireland. He was Chief Secretary to Sir George Carey as Lord Deputy of Ireland from 1603 to 1605. He later served as Member of the Parliament of England for Chester from 1610 to 1611 and again in the Addled Parliament of 1614.

He became a senior official in the English Exchequer, but his career was ruined by the Suffolk corruption scandal of 1618, which led to his being fined and imprisoned. In time he was restored to some measure of royal favour, and returned to Ireland, where he became a trusted Crown servant.

== Biography ==
He was born in Chester, the second son of John Bingley, and was educated at Gray's Inn. During his years in Ireland, he held several lucrative offices and is said to have amassed a fortune.

He returned to England about 1608. In addition to his career in Parliament, where he seems to have made little impression, he obtained the lucrative office of Writer of the Tallies at the Exchequer. Bingley was knighted at Theobalds in January 1618. The occasion involved entertainments and a song performed by John Finet caused offence.

His career was destroyed by the downfall of Thomas Howard, 1st Earl of Suffolk, the Lord High Treasurer. Suffolk, his wife Katherine Knyvett and Bingley have been described as treating the Exchequer as "their private bank account". The allegations of corruption, bribery and maladministration were numerous and detailed, and there is little doubt that all three were guilty as charged. After a trial in Star Chamber, Bingley was found guilty, imprisoned and fined. The prosecution proposed a colossal fine of £100,000, but the actual fine imposed was £30,000. He was soon released from prison, but was much troubled by lawsuits from those he had defrauded, who included members of his own family like his brother-in-law Benjamin Henshawe.

In time he regained a measure of royal favour, and in about 1625 he was sent back to Ireland, where it was considered that his earlier experience of Irish affairs would be useful to the Government. He was appointed Comptroller of the Musters and Cheques for Ireland, and seems to have served the Crown responsibly: certainly, there were no further complaints against him of corruption or bribery. He died in Dublin in 1638.

== Family ==
He married firstly Anne Henshaw, daughter of Thomas Henshaw of the Worshipful Company of Merchant Taylors, and secondly Elizabeth Nevill, daughter of Edward Nevill, 8th Baron Bergavenny and Rachel Lennard, and widow of Sir John Grey.

His will has not survived, but it appears that the bulk of his property passed to Jane, his only daughter by Anne Henshaw, who married William Brabazon, 1st Earl of Meath. She died in 1644, leaving a son Edward, who succeeded to his father's title.

Parliament of England
Preceded by Thomas Gamull; Hugh Glasier	Member of Parliament for Chester; 1610–1614; With: Thomas Gamull 1610–11; Edward Whitby 1614	Succeeded by Edward Whitby; John Ratcliffe
Political offices
Preceded by Fynes Moryson	Chief Secretary for Ireland; 1603–1605	Succeeded by Henry Piers
