= Edward Whitby =

English politician

Edward Whitby (c. 1578 – 8 April 1639) was an English lawyer and politician who sat in the House of Commons between 1614 and 1629.

Whitby was the son of Robert Whitby, who was mayor of Chester. He was of Dunham on the Hill, Cheshire, and matriculated at Brasenose College, Oxford in 1596 at the age of 18, graduating with a BA in 1599. He was admitted to the Inner Temple in November 1600, and was called to the bar there in 1610.

In 1606, he purchased Bache Hall at Upton-by-Chester and became Recorder of Chester in 1613. In 1614, he was elected Member of Parliament for Chester.

In 1619 the Chester corporation was riven by faction. Whitby was accused of official corruption and the committee voted to remove him from office. However the meeting was extremely unruly and a decision was deferred until his return. At the hearing he defended himself successfully and was reaffirmed in his office. He was re-elected MP for Chester in 1621, 1624, 1625, 1626 and 1628 and sat until 1629 when King Charles decided to rule without parliament for eleven years.

Whitby continued as Recorder until his death in 1639. His house at Bache Hall was demolished during the siege of Chester in the English Civil War, when Parliamentary troops used it as a garrison.

Whitby married Alice Gamull, widow of Thomas Gamull and daughter of Richard Bavand of Chester.

Parliament of England
Preceded by Thomas Gamull; John Bingley	Member of Parliament for Chester; 1614–1629; With: John Bingley 1614; John Ratcliffe 1621–1622; John Savage 1624–1625; William Gamull 1626; John Ratcliffe 1628–1629	Parliament suspended until 1640
