= Christian Matheson =

Christian Matheson may refer to:

- Chris Matheson (politician), British politician
- Christian Matheson (Chilean politician)
