= Sir Charles Cayzer, 3rd Baronet =

British politician (1896–1940)

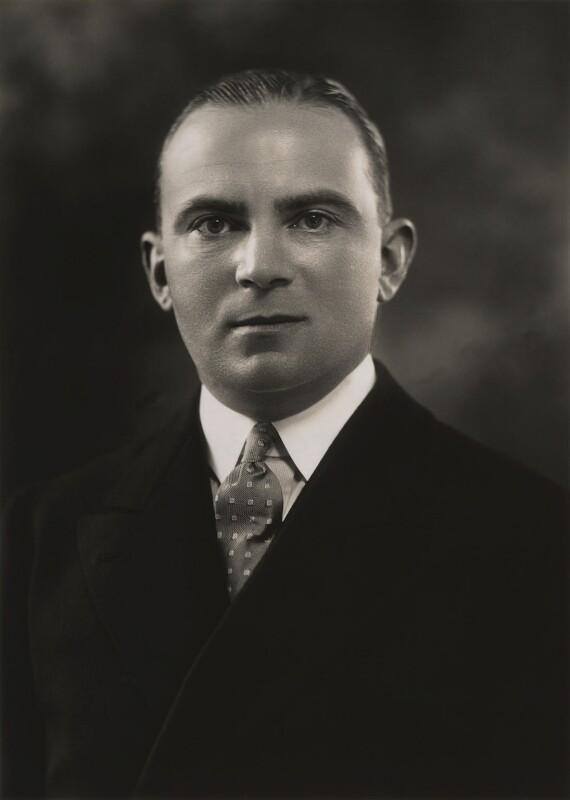
Cayzer in 1931

Sir Charles William Cayzer, 3rd Baronet (6 January 1896 – 18 February 1940) was a British Conservative Party Member of Parliament (MP).

He was the son of Sir Charles William Cayzer, 2nd Baronet, of Gartmore, whom he succeeded in 1917. He was educated at Repton School, Oriel College, Oxford and the Royal Military College, Sandhurst, and was a Lieutenant in the 19th Royal Hussars from 1915 to 1919, serving in France from 1916 to 1918. He was re-employed at the start of World War II as Captain in the 15th/19th Hussars.

On 1 October 1919, he was married to Beatrice Eileen, daughter of James Meakin, Esq., of Westwood Manor, Staffordshire, and of the Countess Sondes. Lady Cayzer died in 1981.

From 1920 to 1921 he was an unpaid additional private secretary to the Secretary for Scotland, Robert Munro. In the 1922 general election he was returned as member for the City of Chester division of Cheshire, and represented the constituency until his death on 18 February 1940 aged 44. He and his butler were found dead from gunshot wounds, with a shotgun laying next to Cayzer. He was buried at Newtyle Cemetery, Angus. Cayzer predeceased his son (Nigel John), who died during the war on 11 September 1943, aged 22.

Sir Charles Cayzer was a director of Cayzer, Irvine and Company, Limited, and a member of the Royal Company of Archers, the Carlton Club and the Cavalry Club. He lived at 86, Eaton Square, London and at Kinpurnie Castle, Angus.

== Sources ==
- M. Stenton and S. Lees (eds), Who's Who of British Members of Parliament, Vol. III 1919–1945, Harvester Press Ltd 1979, p. 59.

Parliament of the United Kingdom
Preceded by Owen Philipps	Member for the City of Chester; 1922–1940	Succeeded by Basil Nield
Baronetage of the United Kingdom
Preceded by Charles William Cayzer	Baronet (of Gartmore, Perthshire); 1917 – 1940	Succeeded by Nigel John Cayzer
