= Basil Nield =

British judge and politician (1903–1996)

- Born: 7 May 1903
- Died: 4 December 1996 (aged 93)
- Occupations: judge and Conservative Party politician.

Sir Basil Edward Nield (7 May 1903 – 4 December 1996) was a British judge and Conservative Party politician.

Following the death in 1940 of Sir Charles Cayzer, the member of parliament (MP) for the City of Chester, Nield was elected in a by-election to take his seat in the House of Commons. He held the seat through four subsequent general elections before his appointment as Recorder of Manchester led to the by-election in 1956.

He was Recorder of Manchester from 1956 to 1960. As a QC he was appointed as a judge to the newly formed Manchester Crown Court, and to the High Court Bench in 1960. According to Graeme Williams, he had the distinction of serving in every Assize town in England & Wales, and published an account of these in 1972 in his book Farewell to the Assizes.

Parliament of the United Kingdom
Preceded by Sir Charles Cayzer, Bt	Member of Parliament for City of Chester; 1940–1956	Succeeded by John Temple
