= Lea-by-Backford =

Coordinates: 53.234°N 2.911°W

- Hamlet
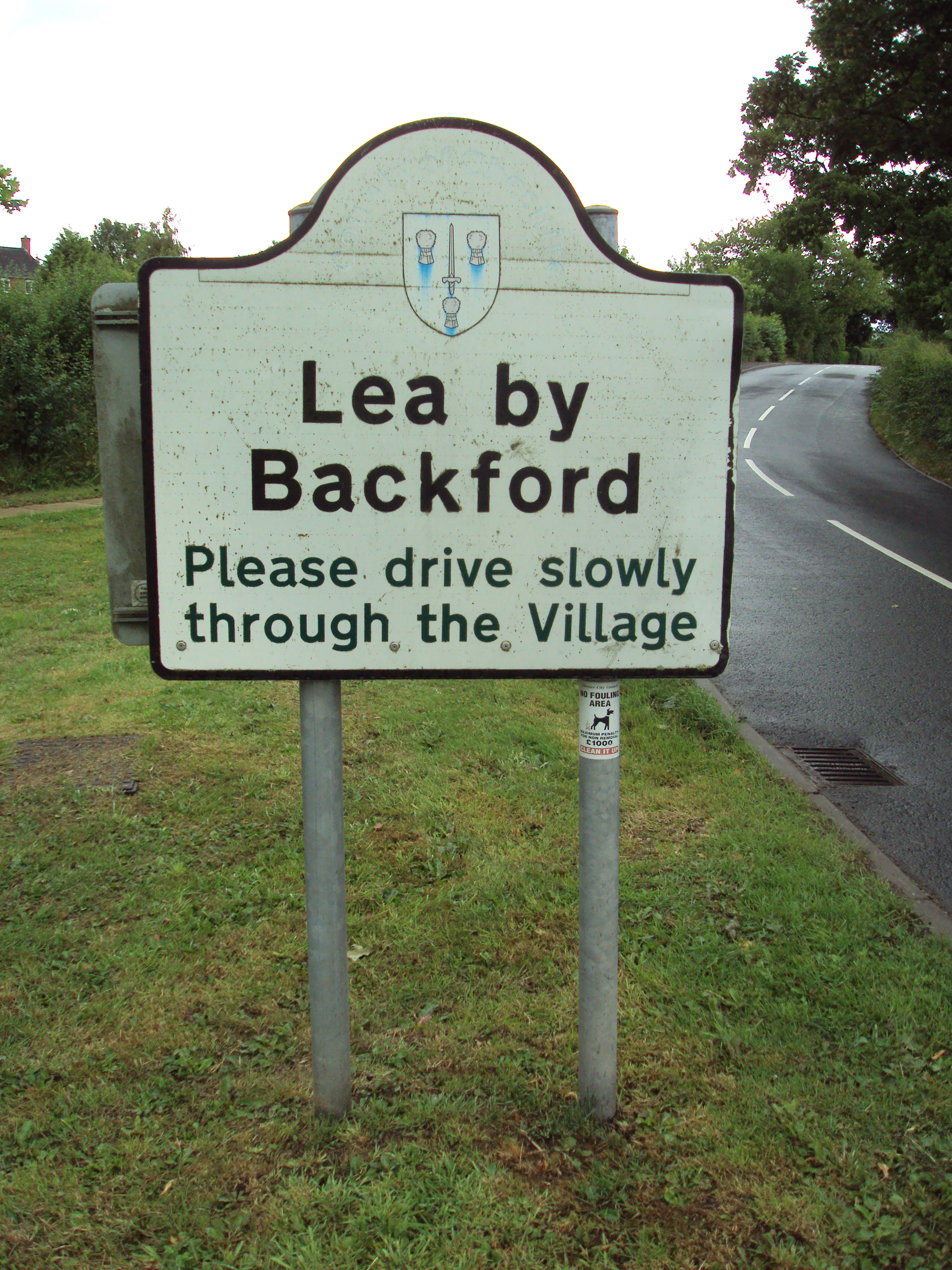
- Lea-by-Backford sign

- Location within Cheshire
- Population: 207 (2011 census)
- OS grid reference: SJ393712
- Civil parish: Lea-by-Backford
- Unitary authority: Cheshire West and Chester
- Ceremonial county: Cheshire
- Region: North West
- Country: England
- Sovereign state: United Kingdom
- Post town: CHESTER
- Postcode district: CH1
- Dialling code: 01244
- Police: Cheshire
- Fire: Cheshire
- Ambulance: North West
- UK Parliament: City of Chester

Lea-by-Backford is a hamlet and civil parish in the unitary authority of Cheshire West and Chester and the ceremonial county of Cheshire, England. It is situated between Chester and Ellesmere Port, west of the A41 trunk road and to the north of the Shropshire Union Canal. Backford is approximately 1.2 mi (2 km) to the east and Mollington is approximately 1.2 mi (2 km) to the south.

At the 2011 census the population of the parish was 207.

In 1086, the settlement was recorded in the Domesday Book as Wisdelea.

Lea-by-Backford, including part of the hamlet of Dunkirk, was a township within the Backford parish of the Wirral Hundred. The population was recorded at 70 in 1801, 91 in 1851, 73 in 1901, 233 in 1951 and 191 in 2001.
