= John Seys-Llewellyn =

Welsh barrister

John Desmond Seys-Llewellyn (3 May 1912 – 4 April 2003) was a Welsh barrister who took part in the prosecution of the Nuremberg Trials. He was also a Liberal Party politician and later became a county court judge.

== Life ==
Seys-Llewellyn was born in Cardiff on 3 May 1912 and educated at Cardiff High School. He then studied French and German at the University of Oxford, matriculating as a member of Jesus College, Oxford, in 1931 and obtaining a degree in French and German. Before the Second World War started, he taught modern languages in schools. He was commissioned as a Second Lieutenant in the Royal Armoured Corps on 22 November 1941. He served in the Royal Tank Regiment, but did not see active service in Europe. He then volunteered to serve in the Far East, and spent two years in India. Whilst in the army, he studied to become a barrister and, shortly after qualifying, he took part in the Nuremberg Trials. He rose to the rank of captain.

He began his practice as a barrister in Chester in 1947. He was Liberal Party parliamentary candidate for the City of Chester at the 1955 General Election and then at the 1956 City of Chester by-election. He spent some time from 1958 onwards as clerk to the justices at Wrexham Magistrates' Court, before establishing his own chambers in Chester on his return to the bar. He was appointed as deputy chairman for the Court of Quarter Sessions for Cheshire on 13 January 1968 and became a judge of the county court on 23 April 1971. He retired in 1985 and died on 4 April 2003.

He married Hilda Elaine Porcher, and they had three sons, one of whom, Anthony Seys-Llewellyn QC, became a Designated Civil Judge for Wales.
