= 1916 Chester by-election =

UK parliamentary by-election

The 1916 Chester by-election for the United Kingdom constituency was held on 29 February 1916. The by-election was held due to the resignation of the incumbent Conservative MP, Robert Yerburgh. It was won by the Conservative candidate Sir Owen Philipps, who had previously been a Liberal MP. Phillips was unopposed.
