= Peter Morrison =

British politician

The Right Honourable Sir Peter Morrison

Parliamentary Private Secretary to the Prime Minister
- In office 23 July – 28 November 1990
- Prime Minister: Margaret Thatcher
- Preceded by: Mark Lennox-Boyd
- Succeeded by: Graham Bright

Minister of State for Energy
- In office 11 June 1987 – 23 July 1990
- Prime Minister: Margaret Thatcher
- Preceded by: Alick Buchanan-Smith
- Succeeded by: Colin Moynihan (Under-Secretary)

Deputy Chairman of the Conservative Party
- In office 10 September 1986 – 11 June 1987
- Leader: Margaret Thatcher

Minister of State for Trade and Industry
- In office 2 September 1985 – 10 September 1986
- Prime Minister: Margaret Thatcher
- Preceded by: Norman Lamont
- Succeeded by: Giles Shaw

Minister of State for Employment
- In office 13 June 1983 – 2 September 1985
- Prime Minister: Margaret Thatcher
- Preceded by: Michael Alison
- Succeeded by: Kenneth Clarke

Lord Commissioner of HM Treasury
- In office 4 May 1979 – 5 January 1981
- Prime Minister: Margaret Thatcher

Member of Parliament for Chester
- In office 28 February 1974 – 16 March 1992
- Preceded by: John Temple
- Succeeded by: Gyles Brandreth

Personal details
- Born: 2 June 1944 Fonthill Bishop, England
- Died: 13 July 1995 (aged 51) London, England
- Party: Conservative
- Parent: John Morrison, 1st Baron Margadale (father)
- Relatives: James Morrison, 2nd Baron Margadale (brother); Charles Morrison (brother)
- Education: Keble College, Oxford

Sir Peter Hugh Morrison (2 June 1944 – 13 July 1995) was a British Conservative politician, MP for Chester from 1974 to 1992, and Parliamentary Private Secretary (PPS) to Prime Minister Margaret Thatcher.

== Background and education ==
Morrison born in Fonthill Bishop, Wiltshire, the third son of John Morrison, 1st Baron Margadale, by the Honourable Margaret Smith, the daughter of Frederick Smith, 2nd Viscount Hambleden, and Lady Esther Gore. James Morrison, 2nd Baron Margadale, and Sir Charles Morrison, Conservative MP for Devizes from 1964 to 1992, were his elder brothers. He was educated at Eton and Keble College, Oxford, where he read Law.

== Political career ==
Morrison was first elected to the House of Commons in the general election of February 1974 for Chester. He was one of the first backbench MPs to urge Margaret Thatcher to stand for the Party leadership in 1975. In 1986 he became Deputy Conservative Party chairman under Norman Tebbit having been previously a Parliamentary Under-Secretary of State and Minister of State in the Department of Employment. In 1987, he was Minister of State for Energy, with responsibility for oil. It was while he was based in Chester that he became good friends with former leader of the Welsh Conservatives Nick Bourne.

During this period it was alleged that Morrison joined the small group of MPs, who included Michael Grylls and Neil Hamilton, who took money from Ian Greer on behalf of third-party clients. During the Cash for Questions Inquiry, Ian Greer Associates admitted Morrison received payments after ceasing to be an MP. The Parliamentary Report in Hansard quotes Ian Greer as stating he made "Two commission payments, perhaps three, for client referrals" to Morrison between 1993 and 1994.

In 1990, Morrison became Parliamentary Private Secretary to the Prime Minister, Margaret Thatcher; he was the leader of her campaign team in the Conservative leadership election in the same year. He was relaxed about Thatcher's prospects and predicted an easy win for her. Alan Clark went to visit him one afternoon during the campaign and found him asleep in his office. Morrison claimed that he had assurances from enough MPs that they were Thatcher supporters to be certain she would win.

After the first ballot of Conservative MPs had shown that Thatcher did not have enough votes to win outright, Morrison suggested to her that she should consult the Cabinet one-by-one to gauge support. He said to her: "Prime Minister, if you haven't won then there are a lot of Tory MPs who are lying". He stood down at the 1992 general election, being succeeded as MP for Chester by Gyles Brandreth.

Morrison was knighted by Queen Elizabeth II in February 1991. He died of a heart attack early in the morning of 13 July 1995, aged 51.

== Homosexuality ==
According to the journalist Simon Heffer, Morrison was gay and went cruising (looking for men for sex) in Sussex Gardens, near Paddington station in central London. Fellow Conservative MP Michael Brown, another associate of Greer and himself gay, described Morrison as gay in a column published by The Independent in 2002.

== Allegations of child abuse ==
There were no very precise allegations, but suggestions that Morrison might have attended gay parties and engaged in casual pick-ups ... Morrison was asked by whips about the accusations and always categorically denied them ... [Norman] Tebbit recalled, 'I began to hear allegations, coming from his constituency [Chester], when he was with me at CCO, that he was excessively interested in schoolboys. I faced him. He swore absolutely that there was no truth in it. I wasn't absolutely convinced.' Tebbit did not discuss the rumours with Mrs Thatcher, however, and she never raised them. The only effect of such stories was that an informal ceiling was put on Morrison's career. He was known to want to be chairman of the party after the 1987 election, but it was understood that this would be too risky. Robin Butler recalled that, in his time as Mrs Thatcher's private secretary, which ended in 1985, no accusations came up about Morrison. When Butler became Cabinet secretary in 1987, however, allegations did surface. They were about homosexuality, and therefore the possibility of being compromised by Soviet agents, rather than about child abuse.

— Margaret Thatcher's biographer Charles Moore on the allegations

In October 2012, Rod Richards, a former MP and ex-leader of the Welsh Conservatives, "claimed he had seen evidence linking" Morrison to the North Wales child abuse scandal.

Investigative journalist Nick Davies reported in 1998 in The Guardian that Mirror crime reporter Chris House had said ten years previously that he had received tip-offs that Morrison received a caution for cottaging with underage (in 1988 this was under 21) boys in public lavatories.

Former Conservative minister Edwina Currie stated that Morrison regularly had sex with 16-year-old boys at a time when the legal age of consent for same-sex relations was 21. In 2002, Currie wrote in her autobiography that "he's what they call 'a noted pederast', with a liking for young boys; he admitted as much ... when he became deputy chairman of the party but added, 'However, I'm very discreet' — and he must be!"

In July 2014, Barry Strevens, a former bodyguard to Margaret Thatcher, claimed that he warned her that Morrison allegedly held sex parties with underage boys. Despite Strevens passing on the allegations to Thatcher, Morrison was promoted later to the position of deputy chairman of the Conservative party. Thatcher's parliamentary private secretary, Archie Hamilton, reportedly took notes of what was said. Strevens reflected: "I am sure would have given her assurances about the rumours, as otherwise she wouldn't have given him the job."

In January 2015, The Daily Telegraph reported allegations that Morrison raped a 14-year-old boy at Elm Guest House in London. The alleged victim said he was walking in the village of Harting in West Sussex in 1982, when Morrison gave him some money and later lured him to London.

In 2019, Morrison was investigated by the Independent Inquiry into Child Sexual Abuse (IICSA), with evidence from Eliza Manningham-Buller (a former director general of MI5), who had been friendly with Morrison for a time. Manningham-Buller said that she may have provided the cabinet secretary with information including the comment that Morrison had a "penchant for small boys". Gyles Brandreth, Morrison's successor as MP for Chester, told the inquiry that he was told several times that Morrison was "a disgusting pervert" and a "monster".

In February 2020, the Independent Inquiry into Child Sexual Abuse claimed senior officials within the Conservative Party knew about allegations concerning Morrison for years but did not pass them on to police.

Parliament of the United Kingdom
Preceded by John Temple	Member of Parliament for the City of Chester; Feb 1974 – 1992	Succeeded by Gyles Brandreth
