= Ruth Crisp English =

British politician

Ruth Crisp English (31 Oct 1908-1978) was a Suffolk born British Liberal Party politician.

== Background ==
She was the only child of Sir Thomas Crisp English and Annie Gaunt McLeod of Sudbury, Suffolk. Her father was a surgeon to Winston Churchill.

She was a nurse at St Bartholomew's Hospital during the 1939-45 war before going to the War Office Intelligence Department. She was one of the founders of the Heckford Society in Shadwell and Limehouse, and was a Governor of the Queen Elizabeth Hospital for Children, Shadwell.

== Political career ==
After the war she got active in the Liberal Party. She was the Hon. Secretary of the Westminster Liberal Party and an Executive Member of the London Liberal Party. On a number of occasions she tried to get elected to Westminster City Council by contesting the Grosvenor Ward, without success. In 1949 she was adopted as Liberal Prospective Parliamentary Candidate for the Lowestoft Division of Suffolk and she contested the 1950 General Election. It was not a promising seat for the Liberals, who had not won it since 1918 and had come third at the last election in 1945. In an election where many Liberal candidates lost their deposit, she managed to avoid that embarrassment;

General Election 1950: Lowestoft
Party	Candidate	Votes	%	±%
Labour	Edward Evans	20,838	44.8	
Conservative	P G Whitefoord	17,516	37.7	
Liberal	Ruth Crisp English	8,132	17.5	
Majority		3,322	7.1	
Turnout		55,456	83.8	
Labour hold		Swing		

== Aubrey Herbert ==
Later in life, she married County Councillor Aubrey Herbert, son of Sir Jesse Herbert, a senior figure in the Liberal Party organisation before the First World War. Aubrey had been President of the Oxford Union and had himself stood for parliament for the Liberals at Chester in 1929 (missing out on election by 162 votes) and 1931, and Sudbury and Woodbridge in 1959. They had no children.
