= Thomas Wogan =

Welsh MP and one of the regicides of King Charles I

Thomas Wogan (born circa 1620) was a Welsh member of parliament and one of the regicides of King Charles I.

== Biography ==
Wogan was the son of Sir John Wogan, who was MP for Pembrokeshire and High Sheriff of Pembrokeshire. In 1646 Thomas Wogan was elected MP for Cardigan Boroughs. During the Second Civil War, he fought on the side of Parliament at the Battle of St Fagans in 1648. After this battle, he was awarded some of his arrears of pay, promoted to colonel and appointed governor of Aberystwyth Castle.

An enthusiastic supporter of the army, he was appointed a commissioner of the High Court of Justice at the trial of King Charles. He attended every day and in January 1649, was 52nd of the 59 signatories on the death warrant of the King.

During the interregnum he received the residue of his back pay as a grant of lands in Ireland, but was not an active member of the Rump and as a Commonwealth-man may have opposed the Protectorate.

After the Restoration of the Monarchy in 1660, Wogan was on 6 June 1660 excepted from the Act of Oblivion (i.e. exempted from the general pardon for King Charles's enemies). He surrendered on 27 June, and, although not within the prescribed period for doing so, his surrender was accepted, and he was one of the nineteen included in the saving clause of suspension from execution in case of attainder until the passing of a future act. His forfeited lands at Wiston, near Haverfordwest, were granted to Robert Werden in August 1662 (even though there is evidence that these estates belong to Wogan's brother). On 27 July 1664 he was stated to have escaped from Cliffords Tower (York Castle), and a proclamation was issued for his arrest. He went to the Netherlands where, along with Edmund Ludlow and Algernon Sidney, he was against the English government. It was rumoured that he travelled to England to ferment a rebellion, but there is no evidence of this and he was subsequently seen in Rotterdam. The last reference that has been discovered of him is dated September 1666, when Aphra Behn stated he was "at Utrecht, plotting".

== Family ==
There is no evidence that Wogan was married, and the legend of his return and death in Wales may be apocryphal. However, in 1669 a woman was jailed "for attempting to raise money for him in his home county of Pembrokeshire".
