= Sir William Williams, 1st Baronet, of Gray's Inn =

Welsh politician (1634–1700)

Sir William Williams Bt
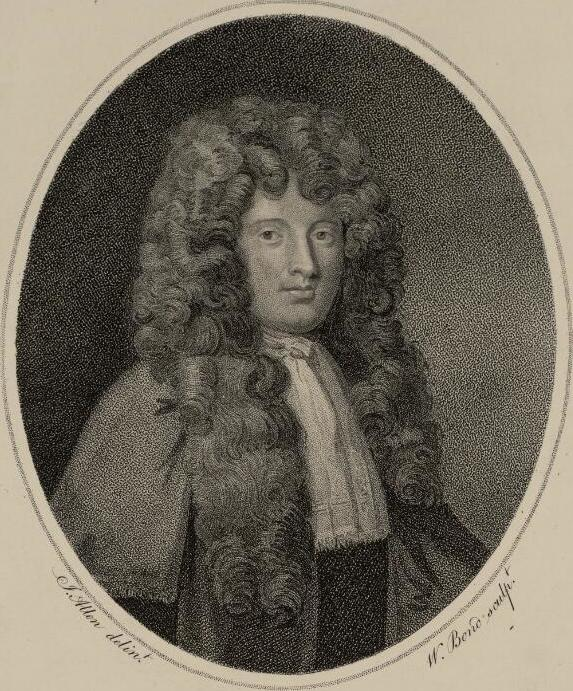

Speaker of the House of Commons
- In office 1680–1685
- Monarch: Charles II
- Preceded by: Sir William Gregory
- Succeeded by: Sir John Trevor

Solicitor General for England and Wales
- In office 1687–1689
- Monarch: James II & VII
- Preceded by: Sir Thomas Powys
- Succeeded by: Sir George Treby

Personal details
- Born: 1634 Anglesey, Wales
- Died: 11 July 1700 London, England
- Resting place: Llansilin, Wales
- Education: Jesus College, Oxford
- Profession: Lawyer, politician

Sir William Williams, 1st Baronet (1634 – 11 July 1700) was a Welsh lawyer and politician. He served as a Member of Parliament for Chester and later Beaumaris, and was appointed Speaker for two English Parliaments during the reign of Charles II. He later served as Solicitor General during the reign of James II. Williams had a bitter personal and professional rivalry with Judge Jeffreys (the hanging judge).

== Early life ==
Williams was born in Anglesey, the eldest son of Hugh Williams and Emma Dolben. He was educated at Jesus College, Oxford, followed by Gray's Inn, to which he was admitted in 1650.

== Parliament ==
After unsuccessfully standing for Chester in the 1673 by-election, Williams was elected Member of Parliament for the constituency in the 1675 by-election. His profile grew, and he was elected to become Speaker of the House of Commons, a post which he held during the 3rd (Exclusion Bill Parliament, 1680–1681) and 4th (1681; Oxford Parliament) parliaments of Charles II. He was the first Welsh Speaker.

In June 1684, allegations were made against him that he had libelled the Duke of York (later James II & VII) for authorizing, as Speaker, the publication of Thomas Dangerfield's Information in 1680. Dangerfield, one of the most notorious of the Popish Plot informers, was by now utterly discredited (he was killed in a scuffle with a barrister the following year). To provide the protection of a seat in parliament, Williams stood and was elected for Montgomeryshire in 1685; however, his return was cancelled on petition, on the grounds that the contributory boroughs had no opportunity of voting. The prosecution resumed, and he was fined £10,000. He was also fined £20,000 after similar action was instigated by the Earl of Peterborough. Supporters worked on his behalf, including the Earl of Rochester; subsequently, £8,000 was accepted as full payment for the former fine, and Peterborough accepted a token payment for the latter after persuasion from James, now king.

Previously a critic of James II, Williams entered the king's service in 1687, being appointed Solicitor General. He had been knighted two days previously, and in June 1688 he was created a baronet, of Gray's Inn in Middlesex. He held an important role in the prosecution of the Seven Bishops, but the violent antipathy between himself and the Lord Chief Justice, Sir Robert Wright, who accused him, with no relevance whatever to the issue before the Court, of taking bribes, probably contributed to the verdict of not guilty. Judge Jeffreys (the hanging judge) tried to ruin Williams with a fine for publishing a libel: this led to the pair engaging in a bitter personal and professional rivalry.

He represented Beaumaris for the 1689 Convention Parliament, and turned against James after he fled England during the Glorious Revolution. He was placed on the committee appointed to draft the Bill of Rights. William III appointed Sir George Treby to succeed him as Solicitor General in the same year. Williams was made a King's Counsel and appointed Custos Rotulorum of Merionethshire and Denbighshire as consolation. The parliament declared the judgement against him for the publication of Dangerfield's Information illegal. He was not elected to Parliament in 1690, and prepared to stand again for Chester with Roger Whitley in 1695. Whitley was instead returned with Sir Thomas Grosvenor, and Williams was again returned for Beaumaris. He refused to take the new oath declaring William the rightful and lawful king, leading to his dismissal as King's Counsel. He left parliament in 1698.

== Personal life ==
Williams married Margaret Kyffin on 14 April 1664, and they had four sons and one daughter.

Williams died at his Gray's Inn chambers in 1700 and was buried at Llansilin in Wales. His baronetcy passed to his son William.

Parliament of England
Preceded by Robert Werden; Sir Thomas Smith, Bt	Member of Parliament for Chester; 1675–1685; With: Robert Werden 1675–1679; Sir Thomas Grosvenor, Bt 1679–1681; Roger Whitley 1681–1685	Succeeded by Sir Thomas Grosvenor, Bt; Robert Werden
Preceded by Henry Bulkeley	Member of Parliament for Beaumaris; 1689–1690	Succeeded by Thomas Bulkeley
Preceded by Thomas Bulkeley	Member of Parliament for Beaumaris; 1695–1698	Succeeded by Owen Hughes
Political offices
Preceded by Sir William Gregory	Speaker of the House of Commons; 1680–1685	Succeeded by Sir John Trevor
Preceded by Sir Thomas Powys	Solicitor General for England and Wales; 1687–1689	Succeeded by Sir George Treby
Honorary titles
Preceded by Sir Robert Cotton	Custos Rotulorum of Denbighshire; 1689–1690	Succeeded by Sir Richard Myddelton
Preceded by The Marquess of Powis	Custos Rotulorum of Merionethshire; 1689–1690	Succeeded by Sir John Wynn, Bt
Baronetage of England
New creation	Baronet (of Gray's Inn); 1700–1740	Succeeded by William Williams
