= Hugh Glasier =

Hugh Glasier (died 6 July 1610) was an English politician who sat in the House of Commons between 1601 and 1610.

Glasier was the second son of William Glasier of Chester and Lea and his first wife Elizabeth Aglionby, probably daughter of Hugh Aglionby. His father was vice-chamberlain of the county palatine of Chester. Glasier was educated at Inner Temple in 1580. On the death of his father in 1588 he inherited lands at Arrowe in Cheshire and on the death of his brother without heirs in 1595 he succeeded to the family estate at Lea. He became an Alderman of Chester.

In 1601, Glasier was elected Member of Parliament for Chester. He was Mayor of Chester for 1602–03, and assistant to the vice-chamberlain in 1604. In 1604 he was re-elected MP for Chester.

Glasier died in London in 1610.

Glasier married Mary Crispe.

Parliament of England
Preceded by Peter Warburton; William Brock	Member of Parliament for Chester; 1601–1610; With: Thomas Gamull 1601; Thomas Lawton 1604–1606; Thomas Gamull 1606–1610	Succeeded by Thomas Gamull; Sir John Bingley
