= John Temple (Conservative politician) =

British politician (1910–1994)

Sir John Temple DL

Member of Parliament for City of Chester
- In office 15 November 1956 – 7 February 1974
- Preceded by: Basil Nield
- Succeeded by: Peter Morrison

Personal details
- Born: 9 June 1910 Liverpool, England
- Died: 10 December 1994 (aged 84) Picton, Cheshire, England
- Party: Conservative
- Spouse: Nancy Hare (m. 1942)
- Children: 2
- Education: Clare College, Cambridge
- Occupation: Farmer

Sir John Meredith Temple DL (9 June 1910 – 10 December 1994) was a British farmer and Conservative Party politician who was the Member of Parliament for the City of Chester from 1956 to 1974.

== Background ==
Temple was born in Liverpool on 9 June 1910 and was brought up in Gayton. He was educated at Charterhouse School and Clare College, Cambridge. During World War II, he served in the British Army, during which he was mentioned in dispatches and was an aide-de-camp to the governor of South Australia. He was a dairy farmer.

== Career ==
Temple was elected to parliament in 1956, defending the Chester constituency for the Conservatives at a by-election. He held the seat until his retirement at the February 1974 general election. As an MP, Temple was noted for his interest in Latin American issues.

In later years, Temple was a deputy lieutenant and High Sheriff of Cheshire. He was knighted in 1983.

== Personal life and death ==
In 1942, Temple married Nancy Hare; they had two children. He died at his farm in Picton, Cheshire, on 10 December 1994, at the age of 84.

Parliament of the United Kingdom
Preceded by Sir Basil Nield	Member of Parliament for the City of Chester; 1956–Feb 1974	Succeeded by Peter Morrison
