= 1940 City of Chester by-election =

UK parliamentary by-election

The 1940 City of Chester by-election was a by-election to the United Kingdom House of Commons for the City of Chester constituency, which occurred following the death of Sir Charles Cayzer. The by-election was unopposed being held by the Conservatives, electing Basil Nield on 7 March 1940.

City of Chester by-election, March 1940
Party	Candidate	Votes	%	±%
Conservative	Basil Nield	Unopposed	N/A	N/A
Conservative hold				
