= Thomas Smith (Chester MP) =

English politician

Sir Thomas Smith was an English politician who sat in the House of Commons between 1640 and 1644.

Smith was the son of Laurence Smith, of Hatherton, Cheshire and his wife Anne Mainwaring, daughter of Sir Randall Mainwaring of Over Peover. He was knighted on 21 July 1615. In 1622, he was mayor of the city of Chester and in 1623 High Sheriff of Cheshire.

Smith was an alderman of Chester and in April 1640, was elected Member of Parliament for City of Chester in the Short Parliament. He was re-elected MP for Chester for the Long Parliament in November 1640. Smith was disabled from sitting in parliament on 22 January 1644 for supporting the King.

Smith married Mary Smith, daughter of Sir Hugh Smith, of Long Ashton, Somerset, and had twenty-two children. His son Thomas became a baronet.

Parliament of England
Parliament suspended since 1629	Member of Parliament for City of Chester; 1640–1644; With: Robert Brerewood 1640; Francis Gamull 1640–1644	Succeeded by William Edwards; John Ratcliffe
