= Amroth Castle =

Grade I listed castle in Amroth, United Kingdom

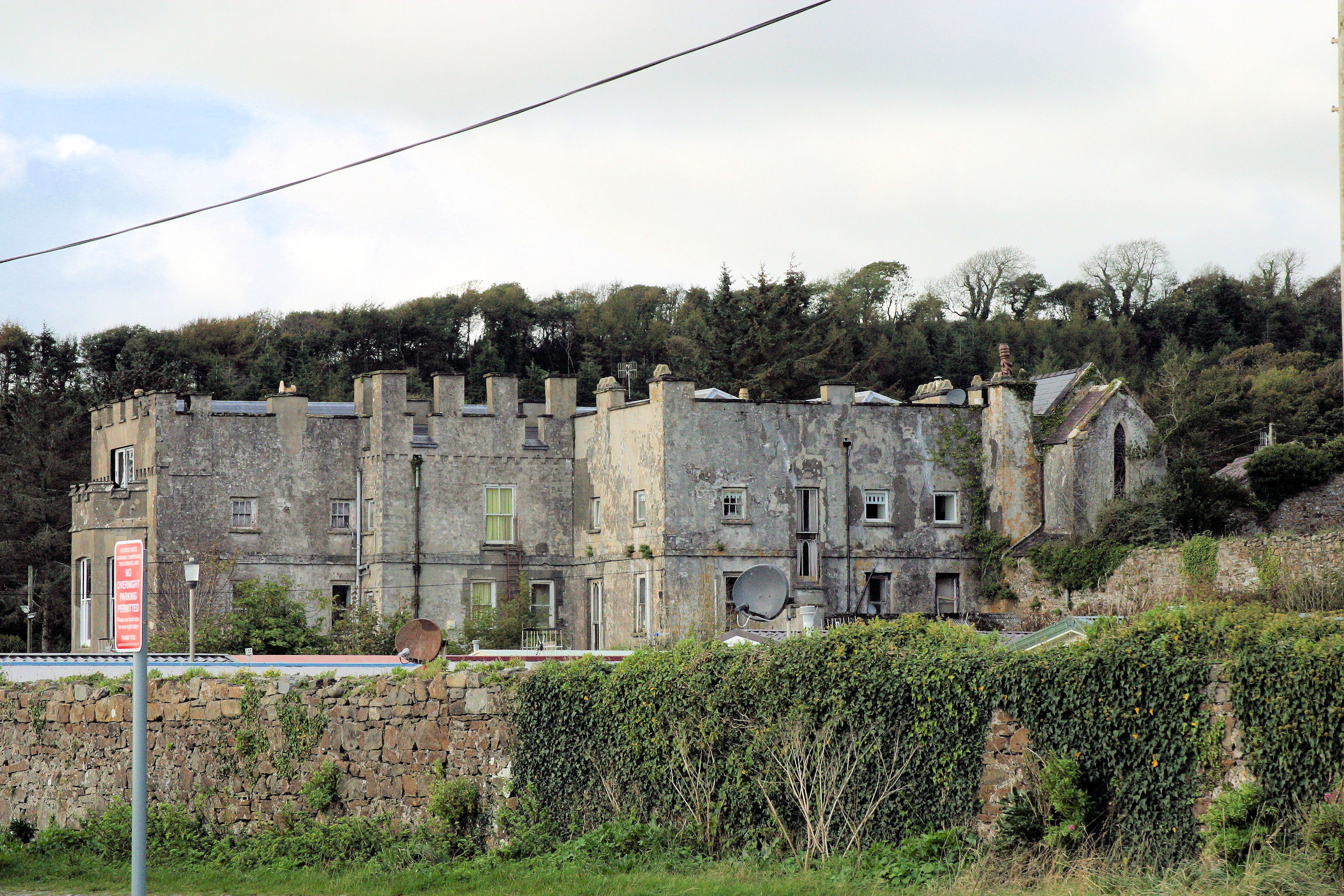
- Amroth Castle in 2011
- Interactive map of the Amroth Castle area

General information
- Location: Amroth, Wales
- Coordinates: 51.7335°N 4.6509°W

Design and construction
- Designations: Grade I

Amroth Castle is a Grade I listed building in Pembrokeshire, Wales. It is a castellated country house dating mainly from the 18th century built on an earlier, probably 15th century, residence, and is now a holiday venue.

== Situation ==
The building stands on the north side of an unclassified coast road 0.4 miles (0.6 km) east of the village of Amroth and 5 miles (8 km) northeast of Tenby. It is surrounded by a high wall with an entrance archway at the south-western corner. The present building is a 19th-century country house built in the style of a mock castle which possibly replaced a small stone castle dating from the 12th century. The gatehouse is much restored. The ruinous remains of the house are a Grade I listed building.

== History ==
The building now known as Amroth Castle was a feudal residence in the early medieval period and was noted by Fenton (in 1810) as being in the hands of John Elliott of Eareweare (the local name for the estate) in 1690 who paid tax on five hearths. It was acquired by the Elliott family in the 14th century. There was an earlier castle half a mile to the north of which little remains.

There was extensive rebuilding in the early 18th century but some earlier, probably 15th century, elements remain. Colonel Ackland acquired the property in 1790 and made several alterations and additions.

After passing through several hands, including the families of Biddulph and Bevan, the property was used by Dr John Howard Norton from 1851 to 1856 as a private lunatic asylum. It was in the hands of the Fussell family in 1861, and purchased in 1898 by shipping magnate Owen Colby Philipps, who later bought the White Star Line, and was created Baron Kylsant of Carmarthen and Amroth in 1923. He lived there from 1904 to 1920. The property passed to his daughter Nesta, who had married George Coventry, grandson of the 9th Earl of Coventry. They moved out in 1930 when George inherited the Coventry title and estates, and the building became a farmhouse.

Amroth Castle was requisitioned by the government during the Second World War, and maltreated. It was purchased in 1969 and converted into holiday accommodation, with a caravan park in the grounds, and as of 2025 National Historic Assets of Wales reports that it continues in this use with the same owner.

== Designation ==
The building was Grade I listed in 1951.
