= The Least You Should Know About English =

The Least You Should Know about English (ISBN 978-1285443539) is a series of non-fiction textbooks by Paige Wilson and Teresa Ferster Glazier that focuses on students improving their basic spelling, grammar, and writing.

== Usage ==
It has been used in classrooms for over 35 years and, as of 2019, is in its twelfth edition.

It is used by the Institute of Education Sciences
