= 1956 City of Chester by-election =

UK parliamentary by-election

The 1956 City of Chester by-election of 15 November 1956 was held after the appointment of Conservative Member of Parliament (MP) Basil Nield as Recorder of Manchester.

The seat was safe, having been won at the 1955 general election by over 11,000 votes

== Result of the previous general election ==
General election 1955: City of Chester
Party	Candidate	Votes	%	±%
Conservative	Basil Nield	24,905	56.66	
Labour	John M. Forrester	13,903	31.63	
Liberal	John Seys-Llewellyn	5,145	11.71	
Majority		11,002	25.03	
Turnout		43,953		
Conservative hold		Swing		

== Result of the by-election ==
The Conservative Party held the seat with a reduced vote share and majority.

City of Chester by-election, 15 November 1956
Party	Candidate	Votes	%	±%
Conservative	John Temple	21,137	51.72	−4.94
Labour	Lewis Carter-Jones	14,789	36.19	+4.56
Liberal	John Seys-Llewellyn	4,942	12.09	+0.38
Majority		6,348	15.53	−9.50
Turnout		40,868		
Conservative hold		Swing		
