= Thomas Lawton =

English barrister and judge

Thomas Lawton (c. 1558 – 1606) was an English barrister and judge who briefly sat in the House of Commons in the year 1584 and from 1604 to 1606.

Lawton was the third son of John Lawton of Church Lawton, and his wife Margaret Dutton, daughter of Fulke Dutton of Chester. He was educated at St Alban Hall, Oxford in 1575 and entered Inner Temple in 1576. He was called to the bar in 1584. In 1584, he was elected Member of Parliament for the newly enfranchised seat of Callington.

Lawton practised as a lawyer in London and became Bencher of Inner Temple in 1597 and Autumn Reader in 1600. By 1602 he was recorder of Chester. In 1604 he was elected MP for Chester.

Lawton died intestate in 1606.

Parliament of England
New constituency	Member of Parliament for Callington; 1584; With: Thomas Harris	Succeeded by Edward Aylworth; William Herle
Preceded by Hugh Glasier; Thomas Gamull	Member of Parliament for Chester; 1604–1606; With: Hugh Glasier	Succeeded by Hugh Glasier; Thomas Gamull
