= Enoch Salisbury =

Enoch Robert Gibbon Salisbury (7 November 1819 – 1890) was a Welsh barrister, author and politician.

== Life ==
The eldest son of Joseph Salisbury of Bagillt, Flintshire, he became a student of the Inner Temple, 7 January 1850, and was called to the bar on 17 November 1852. He went on the North Wales circuit, where he had a good practice, but his main success was at the parliamentary bar. He was elected in the Liberal interest Member of Parliament for Chester in 1857, but was unsuccessful in contesting the seat in 1859.

Salisbury collected books relating to Wales and the border counties, and his library went to the University College of South Wales and Monmouthshire by purchase, in 1886. He died at his house, Glen-aber, Saltney, near Chester, on 27 October 1890, and was buried at Eccleston, Cheshire.

== Works ==
Salisbury published:

- A Letter on National Education, suggested by "A Letter on State Education in Wales", 1849.
- A Catalogue of Cambrian Books at Glen-aber, Chester, 1500–1799, not mentioned in Rowlands's Cambrian Bibliography, Carnarvon, 1874.
- Border Counties Literature, a Catalogue of Border County Books in the Glen-aber Library, Chester, A.D. 1500–1882, pt. i. Chester, no date.
- Border Counties' Worthies (reprinted from the Oswestry Advertiser), 1st and 2nd ser. London, 1880.

== Family ==
Salisbury married, on 28 June 1842, Sarah, youngest daughter of the Rev. Arthur Jones, D.D. She died on 2 March 1879, leaving a son and five daughters. His son was born on 22 May 1855. Captain Philip Sainsbury fought for the Serbians against the Turks in 1876, but by 1900 was a resident of the Chester Workhouse. He died on 18 January 1906.
