= Christine Russell =

British politician

Member of Parliament for City of Chester
- In office 1 May 1997 – 12 April 2010
- Preceded by: Gyles Brandreth
- Succeeded by: Stephen Mosley

Personal details
- Born: 25 March 1945 (age 81) Holbeach, Lincolnshire, England
- Party: Labour
- Profession: Librarian

Christine Margaret Russell (née Carr, born 25 March 1945) is a British Labour Party politician who was the Member of Parliament (MP) for the City of Chester from 1997 to 2010. She lost her seat to the Conservative Stephen Mosley at the 2010 general election.

== Early life ==
Russell was born at Holbeach, Lincolnshire, a farmer's daughter from South Holland. She was educated at the single-sex Spalding High School. She studied at the Polytechnic of North West London (became the University of North London), then went to the London School of Librarianship. She gained the Professional Librarianship Qualification. She worked as a librarian for the Borough of Camden from 1967 to 1970, the University of Glasgow from 1970 to 1971, and Dunbartonshire County Council from 1971 to 1973. From 1989 to 1994, she worked for some MEPs, then for MIND from 1994 to 1997.

== Parliamentary career ==
From 1992 to 1993, Russell served as Sheriff of Chester.

She was one of three councillors for College Ward on Chester City Council, until she resigned after her victory at the 1997 general election. She was expected to be elected as Lord Mayor of Chester had she not been elected to parliament.

At the 1997 general election in an all-women shortlist as the Labour candidate for City of Chester. She was elected as Member of Parliament in that election, unseating Gyles Brandreth. In Parliament she became Parliamentary Private Secretary (PPS) to Beverley Hughes. She had a majority of 915, as of the 2005 general election.

Russell lost her seat in 2010 to the Conservative Stephen Mosley.

Parliament of the United Kingdom
Preceded by Gyles Brandreth	Member of Parliament for the City of Chester; 1997 – 2010	Succeeded by Stephen Mosley
