= Peter Warburton (judge) =

Sixteenth century English judge and member of Parliament

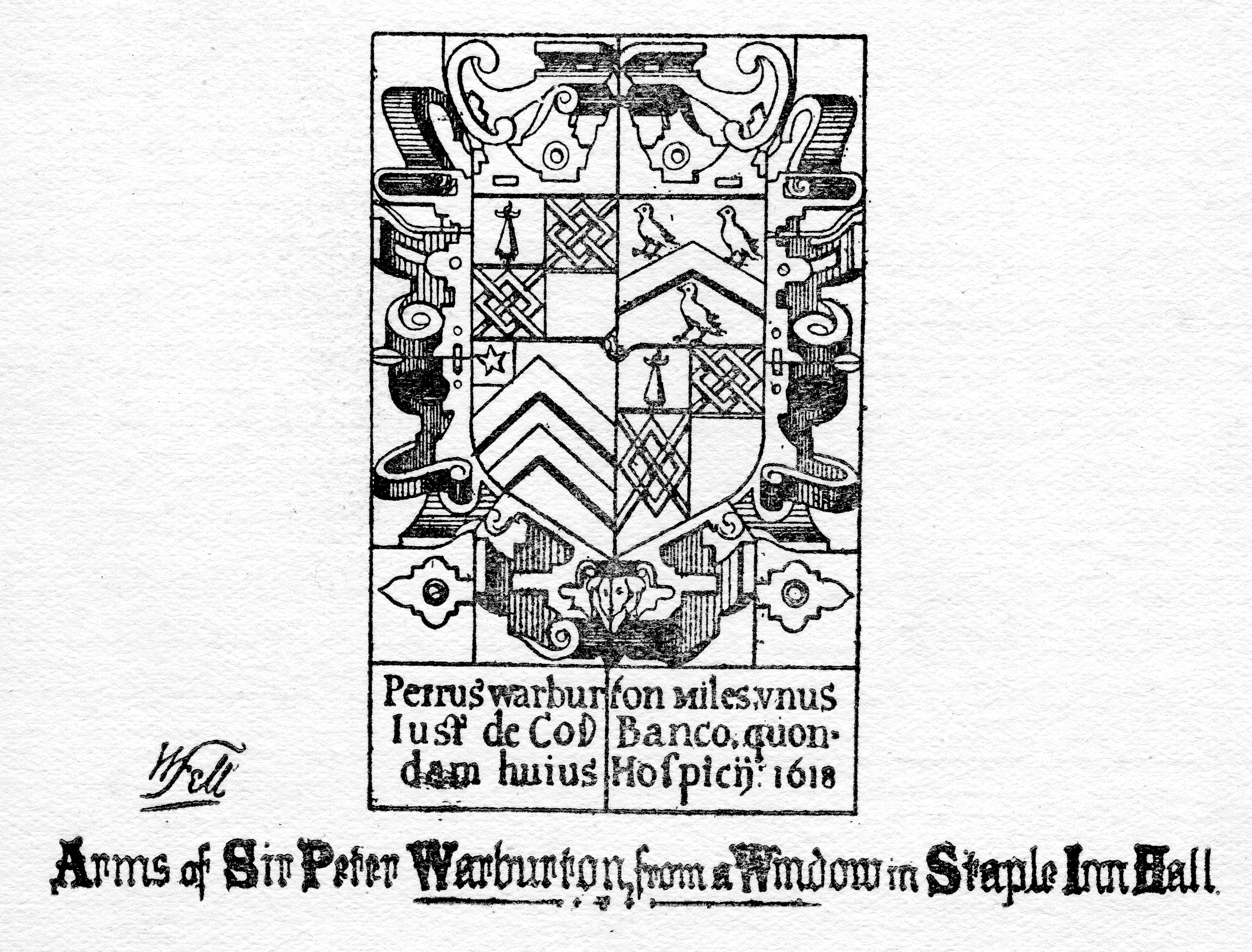
Arms of Sir Peter Warburton

Sir Peter Warburton JP (c. 1540 – 7 September 1621) was an English judge.

Born to Thomas Warburton and his wife Anne, Warburton attended Staple Inn before joining Lincoln's Inn on 2 May 1562. He was called to the Bar there in February 1572, and became a Bencher in 1582. A justice of the peace for Chester, he was recommended as a potential Member of Parliament for that seat, but after being rejected was instead elected for Newcastle-under-Lyme, later sitting for the City of Chester in the Parliaments of 1586, 1589, and 1597. In 1593 he became a Serjeant-at-Law, and on 24 November 1600 was made a Justice of the Common Pleas.

As a Justice he was one of those who supported Sir Edward Coke's majority judgment in Dr. Bonham's Case, and he discharged his duties as "an ancient, reverend and learned judge" until his death in office on 7 September 1621.

== Bibliography ==
- Cook, Harold J. (2004). "Against Common Right and Reason: The College of Physicians v Dr Thomas Bonham". In Boyer, Allen D. (ed.). Law, Liberty, and Parliament: Selected Essays on the Writings of Sir Edward Coke. Liberty Fund. ISBN 0-86597-426-8.
- Sainty, John (1993). The Judges of England 1272 -1990: a list of judges of the superior courts. Oxford: Selden Society. OCLC 29670782.
