= Roger Whitley =

Roger Whitley (1618 – 17 July 1697) was a royalist officer in the English Civil War, attaining the rank of Major General (2nd in command of their forces in the battle for the Isle of Anglesey) and was closely involved throughout the 1650s in plans for a royalist uprising against the Interregnum and Protectorate regimes. He had accompanied the young King Charles II into exile and carried the kings orders into Cheshire on the rising of forces, under Lord Delamere, at the eve of the Restoration.

He was a younger son of Thomas Whitley, of Hawarden, Flintshire and educated at Christ Church, Oxford and entered Gray's Inn in 1637.

He was a supernumerary Gentleman Usher of the Privy Chamber from 1644 and held a number of public offices including that of Quarter-Master General (1667), Knight Harbinger in attendance to the Prince of Orange (1670–71) and of Deputy Postmaster-General from 1672 until 1677.

He was elected a Member of the Convention Parliament of 1660, and of every subsequent Parliament until his defeat in the 1690 election. He represented the north-east Welsh borough constituency of Flint from 1660 until 1681. He was then elected in Chester and served as MP 1681–1685 and 1689–1690. He returned to represent Chester in 1695, until his death two years later. Whitley was a prominent Whig politician and a powerful figure in Chester. He was made a Freeman of Chester in 1666, an alderman from 1680 to 1684 and from August 1688 to his death, treasurer for 1688–89 and mayor in 1692–1696. He was also appointed Custos Rotulorum of Flintshire for October–November 1689 and a Gentleman of the Privy Chamber from the same year until his death.

He married Charlotte, the daughter of Sir Charles Gerard of Halsall, Lancashire, Earl of Macclesfield, and had three sons and six daughters. His massive diary details his social circle and everyday routine.

Parliament of England
Preceded by Unascertained	Member of Parliament for Flint; 1660–1681	Succeeded by Thomas Whitley
Preceded by William Williams; Sir Thomas Grosvenor, Bt	Member of Parliament for Chester; 1681–1685; With: William Williams	Succeeded by Sir Thomas Grosvenor, Bt; Robert Werden
Preceded by Sir Thomas Grosvenor, Bt; Robert Werden	Member of Parliament for Chester; 1689–1690; With: George Mainwaring	Succeeded by Sir Thomas Grosvenor, Bt; Sir Richard Levinge, Bt
Preceded by Sir Thomas Grosvenor, Bt; Sir Richard Levinge, Bt	Member of Parliament for Chester; 1695–1697; With: Sir Thomas Grosvenor, Bt	Succeeded by Sir Thomas Grosvenor, Bt; Thomas Cowper
Honorary titles
Preceded by Sir Roger Mostyn	Custos Rotulorum of Flintshire; 1689	Succeeded by Thomas Whitley
