= Chris Matheson (politician) =

British Labour politician (born 1968)

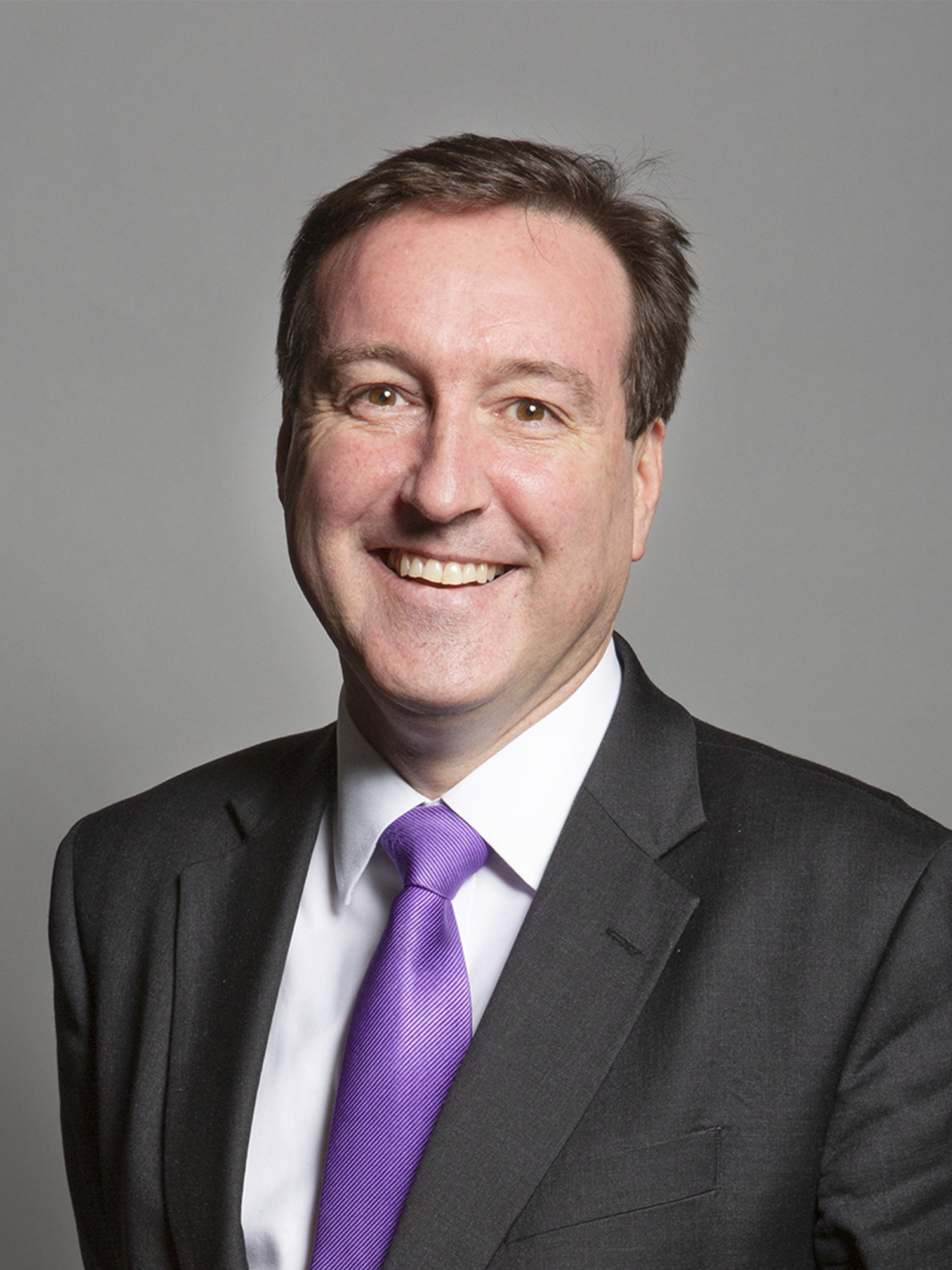
- Official portrait, 2019

Shadow Minister for Media
- In office 9 April 2020 – 4 December 2021
- Leader: Keir Starmer
- Preceded by: Position Established
- Succeeded by: Chris Elmore

Shadow Minister for the Cabinet Office
- In office 12 January 2018 – 9 April 2020
- Leader: Jeremy Corbyn
- Preceded by: Position established
- Succeeded by: Helen Hayes

Member of Parliament for City of Chester
- In office 7 May 2015 – 21 October 2022
- Preceded by: Stephen Mosley
- Succeeded by: Samantha Dixon

Personal details
- Born: Christian John Patrick Matheson; 2 January 1968 (age 58) Warrington, Lancashire, England
- Party: Labour (suspended)
- Education: London School of Economics

Christian John Patrick Matheson (born 2 January 1968) is a former Labour Party politician. He served as Member of Parliament (MP) for the constituency of City of Chester from winning the seat in the 2015 general election until his resignation in October 2022 following sexual misconduct allegations.

== Early life ==
Christian John Patrick Matheson was born on 2 January 1968 in Warrington, Lancashire. He grew up in rural Cheshire, attended Manchester Grammar School and went on to gain a degree in economics and politics from the London School of Economics.

== Political career ==
=== Parliamentary career ===
Matheson was selected as the Labour Party parliamentary candidate for the City of Chester in June 2013. After 7 May 2015, he gained the seat from Conservative Stephen Mosley with a majority of 93 votes, having the third smallest majority of a parliamentary constituency in the UK after the 2015 general election. In July 2015, he became a member of the Commons Culture, Media and Sport Committee.

In the 2015 Labour Party leadership election, Matheson nominated Andy Burnham to be leader of the Labour Party.

On 27 June 2016, Matheson resigned from his role as Justice Parliamentary Private Secretary, joining many members of Jeremy Corbyn's shadow team who resigned following the result of the EU referendum result. He went on to nominate Owen Smith for the leadership in the 2016 Labour Party leadership election. He rejoined the shadow cabinet team following the result and joined the shadow cabinet housing team as Parliamentary Private Secretary to John Healey.

At the 2017 election, Matheson increased his majority from 93 to 9,176, turning Chester from a super-marginal seat into a safe seat. In the 2019 election, Matheson held onto his seat for a second successive election, by a majority of 6,164.

=== Resignation from Parliament ===
On 21 October 2022, The Independent Expert Panel recommended that Matheson be suspended from the House of Commons for four weeks over allegations of "serious sexual misconduct" towards a junior member of staff. He would have faced a recall from Parliament under the Recall of MPs Act 2015, but he announced his resignation shortly after news of the findings were made public. Matheson continued to deny any sexual misconduct but said he felt obliged to resign for health and family reasons. Following the findings, the Labour Party suspended his membership and withdrew the parliamentary whip.

His resignation was effected later that day following his appointment to the Chiltern Hundreds. He was succeeded by Labour candidate Samantha Dixon at the December 2022 by-election.

== Political views ==
Matheson has been described as having "slightly left-of-centre views".

He was a vocal supporter of the People's Vote campaign in 2019. Writing in The Guardian in January 2019, Matheson called Brexit a "hard rightwing coup". Warning of Brexit extremist plans "to tie the UK to Trump's US", Matheson called for the defence of the "values of fairness, decency and internationalism". Despite his stated views regarding Brexit, Matheson voted in Parliament to empower the Prime Minister to trigger Article 50 by giving notification of the United Kingdom's intention to leave the European Union.

== Personal life ==
Matheson was brought up in rural Cheshire and lives in Hoole. He has two children.

Parliament of the United Kingdom
Preceded by Stephen Mosley	Member of Parliament for City of Chester; 2015–2022	Succeeded by Samantha Dixon
