= City of Chester (constituency) =

Parliamentary constituency in the United Kingdom, 1918–2024

Coordinates: 53°10′N 2°55′W

- Former county constituency for the House of Commons
- Boundary of City of Chester in Cheshire

- Location of Cheshire within England
- County: Cheshire
- Population: 92,995 (2011 census)
- Electorate: 74,397 (2018)
- Major settlements: Chester

1918–2024
- Seats: One
- Replaced by: Chester North and Neston; Chester South and Eddisbury

1545–1918
- Seats: 1545–1880: Two; 1885–1918: One
- Type of constituency: Borough constituency

The City of Chester was a constituency (Note: A county constituency (for the purposes of election expenses and type of returning officer)) represented in the House of Commons of the UK Parliament from 2 December 2022 by Samantha Dixon of the Labour Party until its abolition. She was elected in the by-election held following the resignation of Chris Matheson MP on 21 October 2022.

The constituency was split in two by the 2023 Periodic Review of Westminster constituencies with the majority, comprising areas to the north of the River Dee, including the city centre, being combined with the town of Neston to form Chester North and Neston, which was first contested at the 2024 general election. Areas to the south of the river were added to Eddisbury, which was renamed Chester South and Eddisbury.

== Profile ==
The constituency covered the English city of Chester on the border of Wales and parts of the surrounding Cheshire West and Chester unitary authority, including the villages of Aldford, Capenhurst, Christleton, Guilden Sutton, Mollington, Newtown, Pulford and Saughall.

Much of the city of Chester itself is residential of varying characteristics, with more middle-class areas such as Upton and the large rural former council estate of Blacon which is, except where purchased under the right to buy, owned and managed by the local housing association, Chester And District Housing Trust.

== History ==
As part of a county palatine with a parliament of its own until the early-sixteenth century, Chester was not enfranchised (sent no MPs) until the Chester and Cheshire (Constituencies) Act 1542 (34 & 35 Hen. 8. c. 13), since when it returned two MPs to Parliament as a parliamentary borough. It continued to elect two MPs until the Redistribution of Seats Act 1885 which reduced its representation to one MP.

Under the Representation of the People Act 1918, the parliamentary borough was abolished and replaced by a county division, gaining rural areas from the neighbouring constituencies of Eddisbury and Wirral. From then until its abolition, the boundaries of the constituency remained relatively consistent, primarily reflecting changes in local authority and ward boundaries.

== Boundaries ==
Map of boundaries 2019–2024

1918–1950: The County Borough of Chester, the Urban District of Hoole, and the Rural District of Chester.

1950–1974: As prior but with minor boundary changes to align with the revised boundaries of the Rural District of Chester.

1974–1983: The County Borough of Chester, and the Rural District of Chester.

Hoole Urban District had been absorbed by the County Borough of Chester in 1954, but the constituency boundaries remained unchanged.

1983–1997: The City of Chester wards of Blacon Hall, Boughton, Boughton Heath, Christleton, College, Curzon, Dee Point, Dodleston, Grosvenor, Hoole, Newton, Plas Newton, Sealand, Upton Grange, Upton Heath, Vicars Cross, and Westminster.

Rural areas to the north of Chester, comprising the wards of Elton, Mollington and Saughall, transferred to the new constituency of Ellesmere Port and Neston.

1997–2010: The City of Chester wards of Blacon Hall, Boughton, Boughton Heath, Christledon, College, Curzon, Dee Point, Dodleston, Grosvenor, Hoole, Mollington, Newton, Plas Newton, Saughall, Sealand, Upton Grange, Upton Heath, Vicars Cross, and Westminster.

The wards of Mollington and Saughall transferred back from Ellesmere Port and Neston.

2010–2019: The Parliamentary Constituencies (England) Order 2007 defined the boundaries as:

The City of Chester wards of Blacon Hall, Blacon Lodge, Boughton, Boughton Heath, Christleton, City and St Anne's, College, Curzon and Westminster, Dodleston, Handbridge and St Mary's, Hoole All Saints, Hoole Groves, Huntington, Lache Park, Mollington, Newton Brook, Newton St Michael's, Saughall, Upton Grange, Upton Westlea, and Vicars Cross.

Minor changes to reflect revised ward boundaries.

However, before the new boundaries came into force for the 2010 election, the districts making up the county of Cheshire were abolished on 1 April 2009, being replaced by four unitary authorities. Consequently, the constituency's boundaries became:

The Cheshire West and Chester wards of Blacon, Boughton, Chester City, Chester Villages (part), Dodleston and Huntington, Farndon (part), Garden Quarter, Great Boughton, Handbridge Park, Hoole, Lache, Little Neston and Burton, Newton, Saughall and Mollington, and Upton.

2019–2024: Following a further local government ward boundary review in 2019, the boundaries were:

The Cheshire West and Chester wards of Central and Blacon, Chester City & the Garden Quarter, Christleton & Huntington (part), Farndon (part), Gowy Rural (part), Great Boughton, Handbridge Park, Lache, Newton & Hoole, Saughall and Mollington, and Upton.

== Political history ==
=== Two-member seat (to 1885) ===
From 1715 to 1869, at least one of the two seats was held by a member of the Grosvenor family. For most of the nineteenth century, both MPs represented the Whigs and (later) the Liberals. The Conservatives held one of the two seats from 1859 to 1865 and 1868–1880.

=== Single-member seat (from 1885) ===
The Liberals won the single-member seat in 1885 but, apart from the landslide year of 1906 (won by the Liberals with a majority of just 47 votes), Chester returned Conservative Party MPs continuously from 1886 to 1997. At most elections, majorities were in relative terms medium but the party's MPs won marginal majorities at the 1929 general election over the Liberal candidate (when the Labour Party formed a minority government) and at the 1992 general election over the Labour candidate, when the Conservatives had a small parliamentary majority.

Christine Russell of the Labour Party gained the seat easily from Gyles Brandreth at the 1997 general election after 87 years of Conservative control, and retained it until 2010. Her majority over the Conservatives had been reduced to under 1,000 votes at the 2005 general election. (Note: Four of the six candidates at the 2010 general election had contested the seat previously; Christine Russell (1997, 2001, 2005); Allan Weddell (2001, 2005); Ed Abrahms (2005) and Tom Barker (1992). All candidates had contested at least one election for local authorities for wards inside the constituency. The Liberal Democrats including their two predecessor parties amassed their largest share of the vote in 2005 at 21.9% of the vote.)

Stephen Mosley of the Conservatives gained the seat from Labour at the 2010 general election. However, Mosley narrowly lost his seat five years later to Chris Matheson of the Labour Party in 2015 by 93 votes. The 2015 general election result gave the constituency the most marginal majority (0.2%) of Labour's 232 seats won that year.

Matheson was re-elected at the 2017 general election with a significantly increased majority of 9,176 votes, one of the largest swings to Labour in the election. At 56.8%, it was the highest share of the vote that Labour has ever had in the constituency and it is no longer considered a marginal seat. At the 2019 election, Matheson was elected once again, with a reduced but still comfortable majority of 11.3%. On 21 October 2022, he resigned after allegations of sexual impropriety led him to be suspended from the House of Commons for four weeks, occasioning a by-election held on 1 December, which was won by Samantha Dixon with an increased majority for Labour.

== Members of Parliament ==
=== MPs 1545 to 1660 ===
Year	First member	Second member
1545	Sir Lawrence Smith	
1547	Richard Sneyd	William Aldersey
1553 (Mar)	Richard Sneyd	Randall Mainwaring
1553 (Oct)	Richard Sneyd	Thomas Massey
1554 (Apr)	Richard Sneyd	William Aldersey
1554 (Nov)	Richard Sneyd	Thomas Massey
1555	William Gerard	William Aldersey
1558	Sir Lawrence Smith	William Gerard
1559 (Jan)	Sir Lawrence Smith	William Gerard
1562–1563	William Gerard	John Yerworth
1571	William Gerard	William Glasier
1572 (Apr)	William Gerard	William Glasier
1584 (Nov)	Richard Birkheved	Richard Bavand
1586 (Sep)	Richard Birkheved	Peter Warburton
1588–1589	Richard Birkheved	Peter Warburton
1593	Richard Birkheved	Gilbert Gerard
1597 (Sep)	Peter Warburton	William Brock
1601	Hugh Glasier	Thomas Gamull
1604	Thomas Lawton	Hugh Glasier
1606	Thomas Gamull	Hugh Glasier
1610	Thomas Gamull	Sir John Bingley
1614	Edward Whitby	Sir John Bingley
1621–1622	Edward Whitby	John Ratcliffe
1624	Edward Whitby	John Savage
1625	Edward Whitby	Sir John Savage
1626	Edward Whitby	William Gamull
1628–1629	Edward Whitby	John Ratcliffe
1629–1640	No Parliaments summoned	
Apr 1640	Sir Thomas Smith	Robert Brerewood
Nov 1640	Sir Thomas Smith†	Francis Gamull†
1645	William Edwards	John Ratcliffe
1653	Chester not represented in Barebones Parliament	
1654	Charles Walley	One seat only
1656	Edward Bradshaw	One seat only
1659	Jonathan Ridge	John Griffith

† Smith and Gamull were both disabled from serving in 1644.

=== MPs 1660–1880 ===
Year	First member	First party	Second member	Second party
1660	John Ratcliffe		William Ince	
1661	John Ratcliffe		Sir Thomas Smith, Bt	
1673	Robert Werden	Tory	Sir Thomas Smith, Bt	
1675	Robert Werden	Tory	William Williams	
1679	Sir Thomas Grosvenor, Bt	Tory	William Williams	
1681	Roger Whitley	Whig	William Williams	
1685	Sir Thomas Grosvenor, Bt	Tory	Robert Werden	Tory
1689	Roger Whitley	Whig	George Mainwaring	Whig
1690	Sir Thomas Grosvenor, Bt	Tory	Sir Richard Levinge, Bt	Tory
1695	Sir Thomas Grosvenor, Bt	Tory	Roger Whitley	Whig
January 1698	Sir Thomas Grosvenor, Bt	Tory	Thomas Cowper	
July 1698	Sir Thomas Grosvenor, Bt	Tory	Peter Shakerley	Tory
1701	Sir Henry Bunbury, Bt	Tory	Peter Shakerley	Tory
1715	Sir Henry Bunbury, Bt	Tory	Sir Richard Grosvenor, Bt	Tory
1727	Sir Thomas Grosvenor, Bt		Sir Richard Grosvenor, Bt	Tory
January 1733	Sir Thomas Grosvenor, Bt		Sir Robert Grosvenor, Bt	
March 1733	Sir Charles Bunbury, Bt		Sir Robert Grosvenor, Bt	
1742	Philip Henry Warburton		Sir Robert Grosvenor, Bt	
1754	Sir Richard Grosvenor, Bt		Sir Robert Grosvenor, Bt	
1755	Sir Richard Grosvenor, Bt		Thomas Grosvenor	
1761	Richard Wilbraham-Bootle		Thomas Grosvenor	
1790	Viscount Belgrave		Thomas Grosvenor	
1795	Viscount Belgrave		Thomas Grosvenor	Whig
1802	Richard Erle-Drax-Grosvenor		Thomas Grosvenor	Whig
1807	John Grey Egerton		Thomas Grosvenor	Whig
1818	Viscount Belgrave	Whig	Thomas Grosvenor	Whig
1826	Viscount Belgrave	Whig	Lord Robert Grosvenor	Whig
1830	Sir Philip Grey Egerton, Bt	Tory	Lord Robert Grosvenor	Whig
1831	Foster Cunliffe-Offley	Whig	Lord Robert Grosvenor	Whig
May 1832	John Finchett Maddock	Whig	Lord Robert Grosvenor	Whig
December 1832	Sir John Jervis	Radical	Lord Robert Grosvenor	Whig
1847	Sir John Jervis	Radical	Earl Grosvenor	Whig
1850	William Owen Stanley	Whig	Earl Grosvenor	Whig
1857	Enoch Salisbury	Radical	Earl Grosvenor	Whig
1859	Philip Stapleton Humberston	Conservative	Earl Grosvenor	Liberal
1865	William Henry Gladstone	Liberal	Earl Grosvenor	Liberal
1868	Henry Cecil Raikes	Conservative	Earl Grosvenor	Liberal
1869	Henry Cecil Raikes	Conservative	Hon. Norman Grosvenor	Liberal
1874	Henry Cecil Raikes	Conservative	John George Dodson	Liberal
1880	Beilby Lawley	Liberal	John George Dodson	Liberal
1880	Writ suspended			

=== MPs since 1885 ===
Election	Member	Party
1885	Walter Foster	Liberal
1886	Robert Yerburgh	Conservative
1906	Alfred Mond	Liberal
1910	Robert Yerburgh	Conservative
1916 by-election	Sir Owen Philipps	Unionist
1922	Sir Charles Cayzer	Unionist
1940 by-election	Sir Basil Nield	Conservative
1956 by-election	John Temple	Conservative
1974	Peter Morrison	Conservative
1992	Gyles Brandreth	Conservative
1997	Christine Russell	Labour
2010	Stephen Mosley	Conservative
2015	Chris Matheson	Labour
2022 by-election	Samantha Dixon	Labour

== Elections ==
=== Elections in the 2020s ===
By-election 2022: City of Chester
Party	Candidate	Votes	%	±%
Labour	Samantha Dixon	17,309	60.8	+11.2
Conservative	Liz Wardlaw	6,335	22.2	―16.1
Liberal Democrats	Rob Herd	2,368	8.3	+1.5
Green	Paul Bowers	987	3.5	+0.9
Reform	Jeanie Barton	773	2.7	+0.2
Rejoin EU	Richard Hewison	277	1.0	New
UKIP	Cain Griffiths	179	0.6	New
Monster Raving Loony	Howling Laud Hope	156	0.5	New
Freedom Alliance	Chris Quartermaine	91	0.3	New
Majority		10,974	38.6	+27.3
Turnout		28,475	41.2	―30.5
Labour hold		Swing	+13.7	

=== Elections in the 2010s ===
General election 2019: City of Chester
Party	Candidate	Votes	%	±%
Labour	Chris Matheson	27,082	49.6	―7.2
Conservative	Samantha George	20,918	38.3	―2.2
Liberal Democrats	Bob Thompson	3,734	6.8	+4.1
Green	Nicholas Brown	1,438	2.6	New
Brexit Party	Andy Argyle	1,388	2.5	New
Majority		6,164	11.3	―5.0
Turnout		54,560	71.7	―5.7
Labour hold		Swing	―2.5	

General election 2017: City of Chester
Party	Candidate	Votes	%	±%
Labour	Chris Matheson	32,023	56.8	+13.6
Conservative	Will Gallagher	22,847	40.5	―2.6
Liberal Democrats	Lizzie Jewkes	1,551	2.7	―2.9
Majority		9,176	16.3	+16.2
Turnout		56,421	77.4	+9.7
Labour hold		Swing	+8.1	

General election 2015: City of Chester
Party	Candidate	Votes	%	±%
Labour	Chris Matheson	22,118	43.2	+8.1
Conservative	Stephen Mosley	22,025	43.1	+2.5
UKIP	Steve Ingram	4,148	8.1	+5.5
Liberal Democrats	Bob Thompson	2,870	5.6	―13.5
Majority		93	0.1	N/A
Turnout		51,161	67.7	+1.0
Labour gain from Conservative		Swing	+2.9	

General election 2010: City of Chester
Party	Candidate	Votes	%	±%
Conservative	Stephen Mosley	18,995	40.6	+3.8
Labour	Christine Russell	16,412	35.1	−3.8
Liberal Democrats	Lizzie Jewkes	8,930	19.1	−2.8
UKIP	Allan Weddell	1,225	2.6	+0.9
English Democrat	Ed Abrams	594	1.3	+0.6
Green	Malcolm Barker	535	1.1	New
Independent	John Whittingham	99	0.2	New
Majority		2,583	5.5	N/A
Turnout		46,853	66.7	+2.4
Conservative gain from Labour		Swing	+3.9	

=== Elections in the 2000s ===
General election 2005: City of Chester
Party	Candidate	Votes	%	±%
Labour	Christine Russell	17,458	38.9	−9.6
Conservative	Paul Offer	16,543	36.8	+3.7
Liberal Democrats	Mia Jones	9,818	21.9	+7.2
UKIP	Allan Weddell	776	1.7	–0.3
English Democrat	Ed Abrams	308	0.7	New
Majority		917	2.1	–13.3
Turnout		44,903	64.3	+0.5
Labour hold		Swing	–6.7	

General election 2001: City of Chester
Party	Candidate	Votes	%	±%
Labour	Christine Russell	21,760	48.5	−4.5
Conservative	David Jones	14,866	33.1	−1.1
Liberal Democrats	Tony Dawson	6,589	14.7	+5.2
UKIP	Allan Weddell	899	2.0	New
Independent	George Rogers	763	1.7	New
Majority		6,894	15.4	–2.8
Turnout		44,877	63.8	−14.6
Labour hold		Swing	−1.7	

=== Elections in the 1990s ===
General election 1997: City of Chester
Party	Candidate	Votes	%	±%
Labour	Christine Russell	29,806	53.0	+12.4
Conservative	Gyles Brandreth	19,253	34.2	−10.5
Liberal Democrats	David Simpson	5,353	9.5	−4.1
Referendum	Richard Mullen	1,487	2.6	New
Monster Raving Loony	Ian Sanderson	204	0.4	New
West Cheshire College In Crisis	William Johnson	154	0.3	New
Majority		10,553	18.2	N/A
Turnout		56,257	78.4	−5.5
Labour gain from Conservative		Swing	+11.5	

General election 1992: City of Chester
Party	Candidate	Votes	%	±%
Conservative	Gyles Brandreth	23,411	44.1	−0.8
Labour	David Robinson	22,310	42.0	+6.4
Liberal Democrats	John Smith	6,867	12.9	−6.6
Green	Malcolm Barker	448	0.8	New
Natural Law	Stephen Cross	98	0.2	New
Majority		1,101	2.1	−7.1
Turnout		53,134	83.9	+4.1
Conservative hold		Swing	−3.6	

=== Elections in the 1980s ===
General election 1987: City of Chester
Party	Candidate	Votes	%	±%
Conservative	Peter Morrison	23,582	44.9	−2.2
Labour	David Robinson	18,727	35.6	+7.4
Liberal	Andrew Stunell	10,262	19.5	−5.2
Majority		4,855	9.3	−9.6
Turnout		52,571	79.8	+5.3
Conservative hold		Swing	-4.8	

General election 1983: City of Chester
Party	Candidate	Votes	%	±%
Conservative	Peter Morrison	22,645	47.1	−4.3
Labour	David Robertson	13,546	28.2	−6.6
Liberal	Andrew Stunell	11,874	24.7	+10.9
Majority		9,099	18.9	+2.3
Turnout		48,065	74.5	−3.1
Conservative hold		Swing	+1.1	

=== Elections in the 1970s ===
General election 1979: City of Chester
Party	Candidate	Votes	%	±%
Conservative	Peter Morrison	28,764	51.43	
Labour	R.D. Blair	19,450	34.78	
Liberal	Andrew Stunell	7,711	13.79	
Majority		9,314	16.65	
Turnout		55,925	77.64	
Conservative hold		Swing		

General election October 1974: City of Chester
Party	Candidate	Votes	%	±%
Conservative	Peter Morrison	23,095	44.01	
Labour	John Crawford	18,477	35.21	
Liberal	R.M. Green	10,907	20.78	
Majority		4,618	8.80	
Turnout		52,479	75.40	
Conservative hold		Swing		

General election February 1974: City of Chester
Party	Candidate	Votes	%	±%
Conservative	Peter Morrison	24,527	44.29	
Labour	John Crawford	17,759	32.07	
Liberal	R. Green	13,098	23.65	
Majority		6,768	12.22	
Turnout		55,384	80.31	
Conservative hold		Swing		

General election 1970: City of Chester
Party	Candidate	Votes	%	±%
Conservative	John Temple	25,877	52.04	
Labour	John Crawford	18,872	37.95	
Liberal	Michael J. G. Tompkins	4,978	10.01	
Majority		7,005	14.09	
Turnout		49,727	73.15	
Conservative hold		Swing		

=== Elections in the 1960s ===
General election 1966: City of Chester
Party	Candidate	Votes	%	±%
Conservative	John Temple	21,673	46.05	
Labour	John Crawford	18,870	40.10	
Liberal	Peter James Samuel	6,516	13.85	
Majority		2,803	5.95	
Turnout		47,059	78.05	
Conservative hold		Swing		

General election 1964: City of Chester
Party	Candidate	Votes	%	±%
Conservative	John Temple	23,172	48.82	
Labour	Anthony Blond	16,708	35.20	
Liberal	Peter James Samuel	7,583	15.98	New
Majority		6,464	13.62	
Turnout		47,463	79.56	
Conservative hold		Swing		

=== Elections in the 1950s ===
General election 1959: City of Chester
Party	Candidate	Votes	%	±%
Conservative	John Temple	27,847	61.42	
Labour	Lewis Carter-Jones	17,492	38.58	
Majority		10,355	22.84	
Turnout		45,339	78.69	
Conservative hold		Swing		

1956 City of Chester by-election
Party	Candidate	Votes	%	±%
Conservative	John Temple	21,137	51.72	−4.94
Labour	Lewis Carter-Jones	14,789	36.19	+4.56
Liberal	John Seys-Llewellyn	4,942	12.09	+0.38
Majority		6,348	15.53	−9.50
Turnout		40,868		
Conservative hold		Swing		

General election 1955: City of Chester
Party	Candidate	Votes	%	±%
Conservative	Basil Nield	24,905	56.66	
Labour	John Forrester	13,903	31.63	
Liberal	John Seys-Llewellyn	5,145	11.71	
Majority		11,002	25.03	
Conservative hold		Swing		
Turnout		43,953		

General election 1951: City of Chester
Party	Candidate	Votes	%	±%
Conservative	Basil Nield	26,743	58.52	
Labour	John G. Hughes	18,958	41.48	
Majority		7,785	17.04	
Turnout		45,701	82.57	
Conservative hold		Swing		

General election 1950: City of Chester
Party	Candidate	Votes	%	±%
Conservative	Basil Nield	23,660	51.41	
Labour	Campbell McKinnon	16,021	34.81	
Liberal	Arthur Harvey Willitt	6,342	13.78	
Majority		7,639	16.60	
Turnout		46,023	83.88	
Conservative hold		Swing		

=== Elections in the 1940s ===
General election 1945: City of Chester
Party	Candidate	Votes	%	±%
Conservative	Basil Nield	19,064	50.33	
Labour	David Martin Hopkinson	13,585	35.87	
Liberal	Albert Edward Everett Jones	5,229	13.80	
Majority		5,479	14.46	
Turnout		37,878	72.14	
Conservative hold		Swing		

1940 City of Chester by-election
Party	Candidate	Votes	%	±%
Conservative	Basil Nield	Unopposed	N/A	N/A
Conservative hold				

=== Elections in the 1930s ===
General election 1935: City of Chester
Party	Candidate	Votes	%	±%
Conservative	Charles Cayzer	16,882	50.37	
Liberal	Garner Evans	10,183	30.38	
Labour	Lois Bulley	6,450	19.25	
Majority		6,699	19.99	
Turnout		33,515	77.86	
Conservative hold		Swing		

General election 1931: City of Chester
Party	Candidate	Votes	%	±%
Conservative	Charles Cayzer	18,174	51.73	
Liberal	Aubrey Herbert	11,770	33.50	
Labour	Joseph Lewis	5,186	14.76	
Majority		6,404	18.23	
Turnout		35,130	85.77	
Conservative hold		Swing		

=== Elections in the 1920s ===
General election 1929: Chester
Party	Candidate	Votes	%	±%
Unionist	Charles Cayzer	13,454	41.3	−11.9
Liberal	Aubrey Herbert	13,292	40.8	+17.2
Labour	W. Herron	5,846	17.9	−5.3
Majority		162	0.5	−29.1
Turnout		32,592	82.3	+0.4
Unionist hold		Swing	-14.5	

General election 1924: Chester
Party	Candidate	Votes	%	±%
Unionist	Charles Cayzer	12,491	53.2	+7.8
Liberal	William Craven Llewelyn	5,538	23.6	−4.7
Labour	George Beardsworth	5,451	23.2	−3.1
Majority		6,953	29.6	+12.5
Turnout		23,480	81.9	+3.3
Unionist hold		Swing		

General election 1923: Chester
Party	Candidate	Votes	%	±%
Unionist	Charles Cayzer	9,985	45.4	−8.7
Liberal	William Craven Llewelyn	6,212	28.3	+7.0
Labour	George Muff	5,773	26.3	+1.7
Majority		3,773	17.1	−15.6
Turnout		21,790	78.6	−2.6
Unionist hold		Swing	-7.9	

General election 1922: Chester
Party	Candidate	Votes	%	±%
Unionist	Charles Cayzer	11,938	54.1	−2.2
Labour	George Muff	5,414	24.6	+8.9
Liberal	Joseph Banks	4,688	21.3	−6.7
Majority		6,524	29.5	+1.2
Turnout		22.040	81.2	+16.0
Unionist hold		Swing		

=== Elections in the 1910s ===
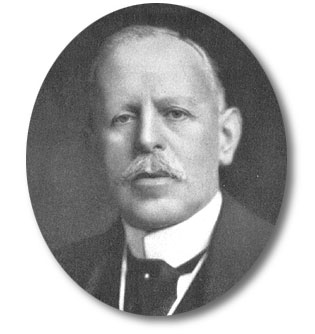
Owen Philipps

General election 1918: Chester
Party		Candidate	Votes	%	±%
C	Unionist	Owen Philipps	10,043	56.3	+5.6
	Liberal	Edward Paul	4,993	28.0	−21.3
	Labour	Arthur Mason	2,799	15.7	New
Majority			5,050	28.3	+26.9
Turnout			17,835	65.2	−27.0
	Unionist hold		Swing		
C indicates candidate endorsed by the coalition government.

By-election 1916: Chester
Party	Candidate	Votes	%	±%
Unionist	Owen Philipps	Unopposed		
Unionist hold				

General election December 1910: Chester
Party	Candidate	Votes	%	±%
Conservative	Robert Yerburgh	3,787	50.7	−0.6
Liberal	Edward Paul	3,681	49.3	+0.6
Majority		106	1.4	−1.2
Turnout		7,468	92.2	−3.5
Registered electors		8,102		
Conservative hold		Swing	−0.6	

General election January 1910: Chester
Party	Candidate	Votes	%	±%
Conservative	Robert Yerburgh	3,978	51.3	+1.6
Liberal	Edward Paul	3,776	48.7	−1.6
Majority		202	2.6	N/A
Turnout		7,754	95.7	+7.3
Registered electors		8,102		
Conservative gain from Liberal		Swing	+1.6	

=== Elections in the 1900s ===
Alfred Mond

General election 1906: Chester
Party	Candidate	Votes	%	±%
Liberal	Alfred Mond	3,524	50.3	+6.5
Conservative	Robert Yerburgh	3,477	49.7	−6.5
Majority		47	0.6	N/A
Turnout		7,001	88.4	+7.4
Registered electors		7,918		
Liberal gain from Conservative		Swing	+6.5	

=== Elections 1832–1900 ===
Idris

General election 1900: City of Chester (1 seat)
Party	Candidate	Votes	%	±%
Conservative	Robert Yerburgh	3,303	56.2	N/A
Liberal	Howell Idris	2,574	43.8	New
Majority		729	12.4	N/A
Turnout		5,877	81.0	N/A
Registered electors		7,257		
Conservative hold		Swing	N/A	

General election 1895: City of Chester
Party	Candidate	Votes	%	±%
Conservative	Robert Yerburgh	Unopposed		
Conservative hold				

General election 1892: City of Chester
Party	Candidate	Votes	%	±%
Conservative	Robert Yerburgh	3,148	55.5	+4.8
Liberal	Hugh Halkett	2,528	44.5	−4.8
Majority		620	11.0	+9.6
Turnout		5,676	84.1	+4.2
Registered electors		6,747		
Conservative hold		Swing	+4.8	

Foster

General election 1886: City of Chester
Party	Candidate	Votes	%	±%
Conservative	Robert Yerburgh	2,549	50.7	+3.6
Liberal	Walter Foster	2,483	49.3	−3.6
Majority		66	1.4	N/A
Turnout		5,032	79.9	−2.4
Registered electors		6,296		
Conservative gain from Liberal		Swing	+3.6	

General election 1885: City of Chester
Party	Candidate	Votes	%	±%
Liberal	Walter Foster	2,740	52.9	−8.3
Conservative	Robert Yerburgh	2,440	47.1	+8.4
Majority		300	5.8	+4.7
Turnout		5,180	82.3	+14.1 (est)
Registered electors		6,296		
Liberal hold		Swing	−8.4	

By-Election 8 May 1880: City of Chester
Party	Candidate	Votes	%	±%
Liberal	John Dodson	Unopposed		
Liberal hold				

- Caused by Dodson's appointment as President of the Local Government Board. The result was rendered moot when the previous general election result was voided upon petition. Dodson quickly stood in Scarborough instead.

General election 1880: City of Chester (2 seats)
Party	Candidate	Votes	%	±%
Liberal	John Dodson	3,204	30.9	−1.4
Liberal	Beilby Lawley	3,147	30.3	−1.8
Conservative	Henry Raikes	2,056	19.8	+2.0
Conservative	Thomas Sandys	1,961	18.9	+1.1
Independent	Frederick Lewis Malgarini	16	0.2	New
Majority		1,091	10.5	N/A
Turnout		5,192 (est)	68.2 (est)	−3.4
Registered electors		7,611		
Liberal hold		Swing	−1.7	
Liberal gain from Conservative		Swing	−1.5	

- The election was declared void for bribery and the writ suspended. Chester was left unreprented until the next general election. Lawley succeeded to the peerage later that year.

General election 1874: City of Chester
Party	Candidate	Votes	%	±%
Conservative	Henry Cecil Raikes	2,356	35.6	+3.4
Liberal	John George Dodson	2,134	32.3	−1.0
Liberal	Thomas Gibbons Frost	2,125	32.1	−2.4
Majority		222	3.3	−10.1
Turnout		4,486 (est)	71.6 (est)	−2.8
Registered electors		6,268		
Conservative hold		Swing	+2.1	
Liberal hold		Swing	−1.4	

By-election, 4 December 1869: City of Chester
Party	Candidate	Votes	%	±%
Liberal	Norman Grosvenor	Unopposed		
Liberal hold				

Succession of Earl Grosvenor to the peerage as Marquess of Westminster.

General election 1868: City of Chester (2 seats)
Party	Candidate	Votes	%	±%
Liberal	Hugh Grosvenor	2,270	33.3	−6.3
Conservative	Henry Cecil Raikes	2,198	32.2	−1.6
Liberal	Enoch Salisbury	1,283	18.8	N/A
Liberal	Richard Hoare	1,071	15.7	N/A
Turnout		4,510 (est)	74.4 (est)	+3.1
Registered electors		6,062		
Majority		72	1.1	−8.0
Liberal hold		Swing	−2.8	
Majority		915	13.4	N/A
Conservative gain from Liberal		Swing	N/A	

General election 1865: City of Chester
Party	Candidate	Votes	%	±%
Liberal	Hugh Grosvenor	1,284	39.6	−5.0
Liberal	William Henry Gladstone	860	26.5	+4.9
Conservative	William Fenton	565	17.4	+0.5
Conservative	Henry Cecil Raikes	533	16.4	−0.5
Majority		295	9.1	−1.7
Turnout		1,621 (est)	71.3 (est)	+5.7
Registered electors		2,274		
Liberal hold		Swing	−2.5	
Liberal gain from Conservative		Swing	+2.5	

General election 1859: City of Chester (2 seats)
Party	Candidate	Votes	%	±%
Liberal	Hugh Grosvenor	1,464	44.6	+2.5
Conservative	Philip Stapleton Humberston	1,110	33.8	New
Liberal	Enoch Salisbury	708	21.6	−5.0
Turnout		1,641 (est)	65.6 (est)	+4.8
Registered electors		2,502		
Majority		354	10.8	0.0
Liberal hold		Swing	N/A	
Majority		402	12.2	N/A
Conservative gain from Liberal		Swing	N/A	

General election 1857: City of Chester
Party	Candidate	Votes	%	±%
Whig	Hugh Grosvenor	1,244	42.1	N/A
Radical	Enoch Salisbury	924	31.3	N/A
Whig	Henry Grenfell	786	26.6	N/A
Turnout		1,477 (est)	60.8 (est)	N/A
Registered electors		2,428		
Majority		320	10.8	N/A
Whig hold		Swing	N/A	
Majority		138	4.7	N/A
Radical gain from Whig				

General election 1852: City of Chester
Party	Candidate	Votes	%	±%
Whig	Hugh Grosvenor	Unopposed		
Whig	William Owen Stanley	Unopposed		
Registered electors		2,524		
Whig hold				
Whig gain from Radical				

By-election, 22 July 1850: City of Chester
Party	Candidate	Votes	%	±%
Whig	William Owen Stanley	986	60.5	N/A
Conservative	Edward Egerton	645	39.5	New
Majority		341	21.0	N/A
Turnout		1,631	64.5	N/A
Registered electors		2,529		
Whig gain from Radical		Swing	N/A	

- Caused by Jervis' resignation after his appointment as Chief Justice of the Court of Common Pleas.

General election 1847: City of Chester (2 seats)
Party	Candidate	Votes	%	±%
Whig	Hugh Grosvenor	Unopposed		
Radical	John Jervis	Unopposed		
Registered electors		2,450		
Whig hold				
Radical hold				

By-election, 30 January 1847: City of Chester
Party	Candidate	Votes	%	±%
Whig	Hugh Grosvenor	Unopposed		
Whig hold				

- Caused by Grosvenor's resignation, by accepting the office of Steward of the Chiltern Hundreds, in order to contest a by-election at Middlesex

By-election, 8 August 1846: City of Chester
Party	Candidate	Votes	%	±%
Whig	Robert Grosvenor	Unopposed		
Whig hold				

- Caused by Grosvenor's appointment as Treasurer of the Household

By-election, 11 July 1846: City of Chester
Party	Candidate	Votes	%	±%
Radical	John Jervis	Unopposed		
Radical hold				

- Caused by Jervis' appointment as Solicitor General for England and Wales

General election 1841: City of Chester (2 seats)
Party	Candidate	Votes	%	±%
Whig	Robert Grosvenor	Unopposed		
Radical	John Jervis	Unopposed		
Registered electors		2,444		
Whig hold				
Radical hold				

General election 1837: City of Chester (2 seats)
Party	Candidate	Votes	%	±%
Whig	Robert Grosvenor	1,282	46.7	N/A
Radical	John Jervis	1,109	40.4	N/A
Conservative	Frederick Dudley Ryder	352	12.8	New
Turnout		1,427	62.1	N/A
Registered electors		2,298		
Majority		173	6.3	N/A
Whig hold		Swing	N/A	
Majority		757	27.6	N/A
Radical hold		Swing	N/A	

General election 1835: City of Chester (2 seats)
Party	Candidate	Votes	%	±%
Whig	Robert Grosvenor	Unopposed		
Radical	John Jervis	Unopposed		
Registered electors		2,053		
Whig hold				
Radical hold				

General election 1832: City of Chester (2 seats)
Party	Candidate	Votes	%	±%
Whig	Robert Grosvenor	1,166	42.9	N/A
Radical	John Jervis	1,053	38.7	N/A
Whig	John Finchett Maddock	499	18.4	N/A
Turnout		1,574	77.6	N/A
Registered electors		2,028		
Majority		113	4.2	N/A
Whig hold		Swing	N/A	
Majority		554	20.3	N/A
Radical gain from Whig		Swing	N/A	

=== Elections before 1832 ===
By-election, 18 May 1832: City of Chester
Party	Candidate	Votes	%	±%
Whig	John Finchett Maddock	577	56.1	N/A
Radical	Edward Davies Davenport	452	43.9	N/A
Majority		125	12.2	N/A
Turnout		1,029	c. 79.2	N/A
Registered electors		c. 1,300		
Whig hold		Swing	N/A	

- Caused by Cunliffe-Offley's death

General election 1831: City of Chester (2 seats)
Party	Candidate	Votes	%	±%
Whig	Robert Grosvenor	Unopposed		
Whig	Foster Cunliffe-Offley	Unopposed		
Registered electors		c. 1,300		
Whig hold				
Whig gain from Tory				

By-election, 15 March 1831: City of Chester
Party	Candidate	Votes	%	±%
Whig	Robert Grosvenor	Unopposed		
Registered electors		c. 1,300		
Whig hold				

- Caused by Grosvenor vacating his seat

By-election, 11 December 1830: City of Chester
Party	Candidate	Votes	%	±%
Whig	Robert Grosvenor	246	61.5	N/A
Whig	Foster Cunliffe-Offley	154	38.5	N/A
Majority		92	23.0	N/A
Turnout		400		N/A
Registered electors				
Whig hold		Swing	N/A	

- Caused by Grosvenor's appointment as Comptroller of the Household

General election 1830: City of Chester (2 seats)
Party	Candidate	Votes	%	±%
Whig	Robert Grosvenor	Unopposed		
Tory	Philip Grey Egerton	Unopposed		
Registered electors				
Whig hold				
Tory gain from Whig				

== See also ==
- List of parliamentary constituencies in Cheshire
- History of parliamentary constituencies and boundaries in Cheshire
