= Stephen Mosley =

British politician (born 1972)

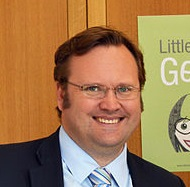

Member of Parliament for City of Chester
- In office 6 May 2010 – 30 March 2015
- Preceded by: Christine Russell
- Succeeded by: Chris Matheson

Personal details
- Born: 22 June 1972 (age 54) Solihull, Warwickshire, England, UK
- Party: Conservative
- Spouse: Caroline Mosley
- Education: University of Nottingham
- Profession: IT Consultant

Stephen James Mosley (born 22 June 1972) is a British Conservative Party politician and former Member of Parliament. He represented the City of Chester from 2010 to 2015.

== Education ==
Stephen Mosley was educated at King Edward's School in Birmingham before reading Chemistry at the University of Nottingham.

== Political career ==
=== Local Politics ===
Mosley's political career began in 2000 when he was elected to Chester City Council. He was re-elected in 2004. He served as Executive Member for Customer Services. In 2005, he was elected to represent the Chester Overleigh Division on Cheshire County Council, and was Chairman of the Health & Adult Social Care Scrutiny Committee, Vice-chairman of the Community Services Scrutiny Committee and a member of the Cheshire Fire Authority.

=== Parliamentary career ===
Stephen Mosley was selected as the Conservative Parliamentary Candidate for the City of Chester Constituency in September 2007. He spent the next three years campaigning across the city and gained the seat from Labour with 18,995 votes (40.6%) after defeating Christine Russell, who had been in office since 1997, with a majority of 2,583. He served as a member of the Commons Science and Technology Committee. He lost his seat at the 2015 general election to Labour's Chris Matheson by a narrow margin of 93 votes.

=== Position on EU Referendum ===
During the House of Commons vote in October 2011 on a backbench motion for a bill to be introduced in the next parliamentary session to enable a referendum to be held on Britain's continued membership of the European Union, Mosley was one of 81 Conservative MPs who voted against the Government Whip to support a referendum.

Parliament of the United Kingdom
Preceded by Christine Russell	Member of Parliament for City of Chester; 2010–2015	Succeeded by Chris Matheson
