= Teresa Ferster Glazier =

American writer

Teresa Ferster Glazier (December 7, 1907 – January 19, 2004), born Lily Teresa Ferster, was an American nonfiction writer. One of her most famous works was The Least You Should Know About English series of textbooks used by the Institute of Education Sciences.
