= Frank Glazier =

American football coach (1934–1993)

Biographical details
- Born: January 4, 1934; Littleton, New Hampshire, U.S.
- Died: January 28, 1993 (aged 59); Stuart, Florida, U.S.

Coaching career (HC unless noted)
- 1978–1981: William Paterson

Head coaching record
- Overall: 17–22–1

Frank H. Glazier (January 4, 1934 – January 28, 1993) was an American football coach. He served as the head football coach at William Paterson University team in Wayne Township, New Jersey for four years, from 1978 to 1981, compiled a record of 17–22–1. He had previously coached at Long Branch High School. Glazier died in Stuart, Florida on January 28, 1993, at the age of 59.

== Head coaching record ==
Year	Team	Overall	Conference	Standing	Bowl/playoffs
William Paterson Pioneers (New Jersey State Athletic Conference) (1978–1981)
1978	William Paterson	3–7	2–3	4th	
1979	William Paterson	5–4–1	3–1–1	3rd	
1980	William Paterson	5–5	2–4	T–4th	
1981	William Paterson	4–6	2–4	5th	
William Paterson:		17–22–1	9–12–1		
Total:		17–22–1			
