= Lawrence Smith (MP) =

English politician and philanthropist

Sir Lawrence Smith (1515/16 – 1582), of Chester and Hough, Cheshire, was an English Member of Parliament (MP), mayor and philanthropist. He had a son, Sir Thomas Fouleshurst Smith, who was Sheriff and Mayor of Chester. He died Dec 21st, 1614 and is buried in St Mary's Church, Nantwich.

He was a Member of the Parliament of England for Cheshire in 1545 and 1555 and for Chester in 1558 and 1559. He was Mayor of Chester 1540–1, 1558–9, 1563–4, and 1570–1.
