= John Ratcliffe (Chester MP, died 1633) =

English brewer and politician

John Ratcliffe (died 30 March 1633) was an English brewer and politician who sat in the House of Commons at various times between 1621 and 1629.

== Life ==
Ratcliffe was the son of John Ratcliffe who moved to Chester and became active in the government of the city, being mayor of Chester.

In 1602 his first wife died. Ratcliffe married as his second wife Jane Brerewood, daughter of John Brerewood of Chester.

He was a brewer and became an alderman of the city, and was made mayor for 1611–12 and 1628–29. He was an ardent puritan. In 1621, he was elected Member of Parliament for City of Chester. He was elected MP for Chester again in 1628 and sat until 1629 when King Charles decided to rule without parliament for eleven years.

Ratcliffe died in 1633.

Their son John became Recorder and MP for Chester.

Parliament of England
Preceded by Edward Whitby; John Bingley	Member of Parliament for City of Chester; 1621; With: Edward Whitby	Succeeded by Edward Whitby; John Savage
Preceded by Edward Whitby; William Samuel	Member of Parliament for City of Chester; 1628–1629; With: Edward Whitby	Parliament suspended until 1640
