= John Ratcliffe (Chester MP, died 1673) =

English lawyer and politician

John Ratcliffe (ca. 1611 – 13 January 1673) was an English lawyer and politician who sat in the House of Commons at various times between 1646 and 1673.

== Life ==
Ratcliffe was the son of John Ratcliffe, brewer and alderman of Chester and his second wife Jane (born Brerewood), daughter of Mary (born Parrey) and John Brerewood of Chester. He was educated at Queen's College, Oxford in 1628. In 1629, he entered Middle Temple. He succeeded his father in 1633 and was called to the bar in 1637.

In 1646, Ratcliffe was chosen recorder of Chester in 1646 and at about the same time was elected member of parliament for City of Chester in the Long Parliament to replace one of the disabled MPs. He was later removed from his position as recorder because he refused the negative oath and was replaced in 1651 by Richard Haworth, a lawyer of Manchester. Haworth was unwilling to make Chester his permanent residence and he surrendered the office to Ratcliffe in 1656. In 1659, Radcliffe became involved in the Cheshire rising led by George Booth, 1st Baron Delamer. Ratcliffe was one of the members of the corporation opposed to the regime which colluded with Booth although he was not penalised after the surrender of the city to John Lambert.

In 1660, Ratcliffe was elected MP for the City of Chester in the Convention Parliament. He was re-elected in 1661 as MP for Chester in the Cavalier Parliament In 1662 he was put out of his position as recorder by the commissioners for regulating the corporations of the city of Chester and the county of Cheshire, because he refused to take the oath required by act of parliament. Ratcliffe held his seat until his death in 1673, and the consequent contested by election resulted in serious disorder and accidental loss of life during the poll.

Ratcliffe married Dorothy and had at least two sons.

Parliament of England
Preceded by Sir Thomas Smith; Francis Gamull	Member of Parliament for City of Chester; 1646–1653; With: William Edwards	Succeeded by Not represented in Barebones Parliament
