= George Mainwaring (MP, died 1695) =

English Member of Parliament

George Mainwaring (bapt. 10 December 1642 – 14 August 1695) was an English Member of Parliament and a member of a distinguished family line from Cheshire.

George Mainwaring was the third surviving son of Randle Mainwaring and his wife, Elizabeth (née Hawes), both of whom were based in London. He father, who was by profession a mercer, had been a significant figure among the radicals at the time of the English Civil War, commanding a regiment but never becoming particularly prosperous. George was baptised on 10 December 1642 and became a merchant in Chester. On 25 April 1672, he married Elizabeth Bradshaw, daughter of a wealthy alderman of Chester, having become a councilman in the previous year.

Mainwaring continued as a councilman until 1676, and served as sheriff in 1672-73. He was an alderman for eight years from 1676 and mayor in 1681-82, as well as being a lieutenant in the militia by that time. He became a contentious figure around the time of a visit by the Duke of Monmouth, which occurred during his mayoralty and saw him accused of encouraging riots and trying to obstruct those who wished to take action against dissenters. As a consequence, his position as alderman ended in 1684 when he was specifically excluded from membership of Chester's corporation upon its adoption of a new charter.

His position as alderman was reinstated in 1688 and continued until his death on 14 August 1695, when he was buried at Holy Trinity Church, Chester. He held Whig sympathies and collaborated with Roger Whitley, with whom he was elected to the Convention Parliament of 1689. The two men were not re-elected later in that year.

The next descendant of Mainwaring to be elected to parliament was Townshend Mainwaring in the 19th century.
