= William Ince (MP) =

Member of the Parliament of England

William Ince (died 27 January 1679) was an English politician who sat in the House of Commons in 1660.

Ince was sheriff of Chester in 1635 and as a pro-royalist became mayor of Chester in 1643 after King Charles visited the city. He was described as a yeoman. However he survived the purge of Royalists ro the government of the town in 1646.

Ince was described as a moderate and may have been a Presbyterian and in 1660, he was elected Member of Parliament for City of Chester in the Convention Parliament. Ince died in 1679 and was buried on the south side of the altar in Holy Trinity Church, Chester.

Ince married twice. His second wife was Anne Thorpe, daughter of Thomas Thorpe.
