= Richard Grosvenor =

Richard Grosvenor may refer to:

- Sir Richard Grosvenor, 1st Baronet (1585–1645)
- Sir Richard Grosvenor, 2nd Baronet (c.1604–1665)
- Sir Richard Grosvenor, 4th Baronet (1693–1732)
- Richard Grosvenor, 1st Earl Grosvenor (1731–1802)
- Richard Grosvenor, 2nd Marquess of Westminster (1795–1869)
- Richard Grosvenor, 1st Baron Stalbridge (1837–1912)
