= Thomas Grosvenor =

Thomas Grosvenor may refer to:

- Sir Thomas Grosvenor, 3rd Baronet (1656–1700), MP for Chester
- Sir Thomas Grosvenor, 5th Baronet (1693–1733), MP for Chester, son of the above
- Thomas Grosvenor (1734–1795), MP for Chester, nephew of the above
- Thomas Grosvenor (British Army officer) (1764–1851), British soldier and MP, son of the above
- Thomas P. Grosvenor (1778–1817), American politician
