= Listed buildings in Churton by Aldford =

Churton by Aldford is a former civil parish, now in the parish of Churton, in Cheshire West and Chester, England. It contains seven buildings that are recorded in the National Heritage List for England as designated listed buildings, all of which are at Grade II. This grade is the lowest of the three gradings given to listed buildings and is applied to "buildings of national importance and special interest". The parish contained part of the village of Churton, but is otherwise rural.

| Name and location | Photograph | Date | Notes |
|---|---|---|---|
| Old Post Office; 53.10432°N 2.87161°W | | Mid-17th century (probable) | Basically a timber-framed cottage that was altered in the 19th century. Parts of it stand on a sandstone plinth, and parts have been replaced in painted brick. The cottage is in a single storey with an attic. The thatched roof contains an eyebrow dormer. The windows are casements. Inside the cottage is an inglenook. |
| Church House Farm; 53.1020°N 2.8651°W | — | 1682 | A farmhouse in brick with sandstone dressings and a slate roof. The front is symmetrical and is in two storeys with an attic, and a three-storey porch. In the right end gable is a canted bay window with a hipped roof. The other windows are casements. |
| Wall of former walled garden, Churton Lodge; 53.10276°N 2.86875°W | | 19th century or earlier | The wall is partly in sandstone, and partly in brick, with a stone coping. It has a doorway of brick and stone, above which is a Jacobean pediment. |
| Churton Lodge; 53.1036°N 2.8691°W | — | Mid-19th century | Churton Lodge is a country house in Italianate attributed to T. M. Lockwood. It is constructed in sandstone with a slate roof. It has a symmetrical front. The central portion has canted corners and is in three storeys; on each side is a recessed two-storey wing. Each wing has a two-storey canted bay window. There are three shaped gables on the central portion, and panelled parapets on the wings. The porch has a round-headed opening with a frieze and a broken curved pediment containing a cartouche, carried on composite pilasters. |
| Churton Mission Hall; 53.1045°N 2.8720°W | | 1864 | Built as a school, paid for by the 2nd Marquis of Westminster, and attached to the schoolmaster's house. It is constructed in sandstone with a slate roof. In the gable is a three-light mullioned and transomed window, above which is a plaque with the date, the Grosvenor arms, and a Talbot dog. There is a lateral bellcote containing a school bell. |
| Old School Cottage; 53.1046°N 2.8719°W | | 1864 | Built as the schoolmaster's house, paid for by the 2nd Marquis of Westminster, and attached to the school. It is constructed in sandstone with a slate roof, and is in Jacobean style. On the right side is a cross-wing. The windows are casements. |
| Grotto; 53.1031°N 2.8691°W | — | Late 19th century | This consists of large blocks of sandstone forming a bank 4 m (13 ft) high in the garden of Churton Lodge. Inside is a winding passage, to which there are several openings. |

== See also ==
- Listed buildings in Churton by Farndon
