= Sir Henry Bunbury, 3rd Baronet =

British Tory politician

Sir Henry Bunbury, 3rd Baronet (29 November 1676 – 12 February 1733) of Stanney Hall, Cheshire was a British Tory politician who sat in the English and British House of Commons for 27 years from 1700 to 1727. At the time of the Hanoverian Succession in 1714 he was a Hanoverian Tory, but later offered support to the Jacobites.

== Early life and family ==
Bunbury was the son of Sir Henry Bunbury, 2nd Baronet and his wife Mary Eyton, daughter of Sir Kenrick Eyton. In 1687, aged only eleven, he succeeded his father as baronet. Bunbury was educated at St Catharine's College, Cambridge. On 15 May 1699, he married Susannah Hanmer, only surviving daughter of William Hanmer (the second son of Sir Thomas Hanmer, 2nd Baronet), and had by her four sons and five daughters.

== Career ==
Bunbury was High Sheriff of Cheshire in 1699. He was elected Member of Parliament (MP) for Chester at the two contested elections in January and December 1701. Thereafter he was returned unopposed in 1702, 1705, 1708 and 1710. In 1711, he was appointed Commissioner of the Revenue for Ireland. He was returned unopposed as a Tory at the 1713 general election and re-elected in a contest at Chester in the 1715 general election. In spite of the change of government, he initially held his Irish post, but after he was found with seditious pamphlets and engaged in Jacobite correspondence in May 1715 he was removed from the post in September. He was re-elected at the 1722 general election but was defeated in 1727.

== Death and legacy ==
Bunbury died in 1733 and was buried in Stoke, Chester four days later. He was succeeded in the baronetcy successively by his sons Charles and William. His daughter Isabella married General John Lee, and was mother of Continental General Charles Lee.

Parliament of England
Preceded by Sir Thomas Grosvenor, Bt; Peter Shakerley	Member of Parliament for Chester; 1700–1707; With: Peter Shakerley	Succeeded by Parliament of Great Britain
Parliament of Great Britain
Preceded by Parliament of England	Member of Parliament for Chester; 1707–1727; With: Peter Shakerley 1707–1715; Sir Richard Grosvenor, Bt 1715–1727	Succeeded by Sir Richard Grosvenor, Bt; Thomas Grosvenor
Baronetage of England
Preceded by Henry Bunbury	Baronet (of Bunbury); 1687–1733	Succeeded by Charles Bunbury
