= Listed buildings in Churton by Farndon =

Churton by Farndon is a former civil parish, now in the parish of Churton, in Cheshire West and Chester, England. It contains three buildings that are recorded in the National Heritage List for England as designated listed buildings, all of which are at Grade II. This grade is the lowest of the three gradings given to listed buildings and is applied to "buildings of national importance and special interest". The parish contained part of the village of Churton, but was otherwise rural.

Name and location	Photograph	Date	Notes
Churton Hall; 53.1020°N 2.8689°W		1569 (?)	This is a country house, timber-framed but partly replaced in brick at the rear. It has a slate roof. The house is in two storeys, and has an E-shaped plan. There is a single-storey timber-framed porch, above which are plaques containing armorial bearings. On the left side of the house is a massive sandstone chimney. The windows are casements.
Wall to former walled garden, Churton Hall; 53.10186°N 2.86990°W	—	18th century or earlier	The wall is constructed in brick, and is in varying heights. At the southeast corner is a sandstone pier. There are two more piers, in brick, that formerly formed part of the gateway to the hall.
Cross Cottage; 53.1020°N 2.8706°W		Early 19th century	The cottage was extended, probably in the 1930s. It is in brick with a hipped slate roof, on a sandstone plinth. The windows are casements.

== See also ==
- Listed buildings in Churton by Aldford
