= Charles Bunbury =

Charles Bunbury may refer to:

- Sir Charles Bunbury, 4th Baronet (1708–1742), MP
- Sir Charles Bunbury, 6th Baronet (1740–1821), MP
- Sir Charles Bunbury, 8th Baronet (1809–1886), English naturalist
- Sir Charles Henry Napier Bunbury, 11th Baronet (1886–1963) of the Bunbury baronets
