= Sir Thomas Grosvenor, 3rd Baronet =

English politician (1656–1700)

Sir Thomas Grosvenor Bt
- Portrait by Sir Peter Lely, 1678
- Born: 20 November 1656; Eaton Hall, Cheshire
- Died: 2 July 1700 (aged 43); England
- Resting place: St Mary's Church, Eccleston, Cheshire
- Spouse: Mary Davies (m. 1677)
- Children: 8, including: Sir Richard Grosvenor, 4th Baronet; Sir Thomas Grosvenor, 5th Baronet; Sir Robert Grosvenor, 6th Baronet

Sir Thomas Grosvenor, 3rd Baronet (20 November 1656 – 2 July 1700) was an English Tory politician who was an ancestor of the modern day Dukes of Westminster. He was the first member of the family to build a substantial house on the present site of Eaton Hall, Cheshire.

== Early life and education ==
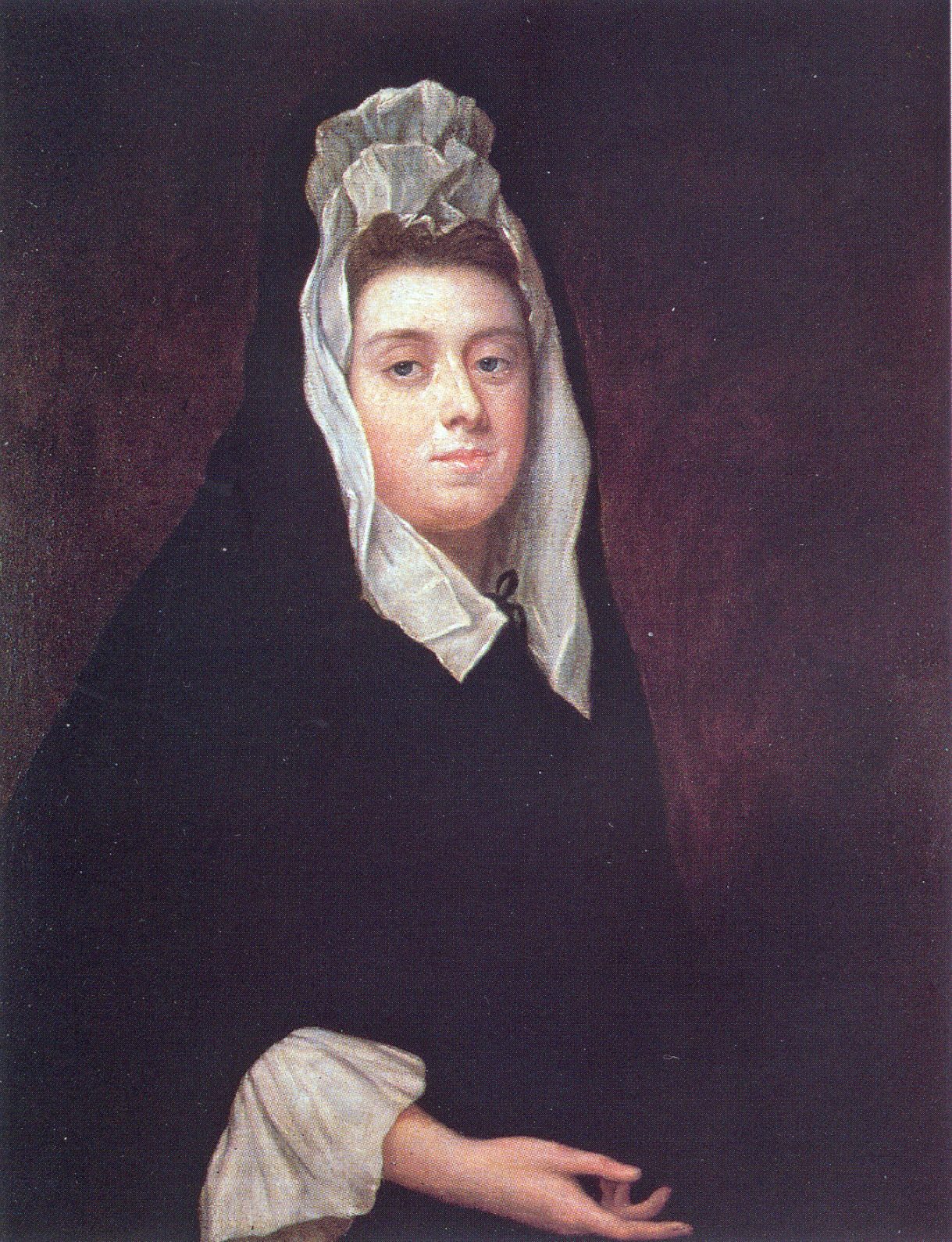
Mary, Lady Grosvenor, by Michael Dahl

Grosvenor was born at Eaton Hall, Cheshire, the son of Roger Grosvenor by his wife, Christian (or Christine), daughter of Thomas Myddleton of Chirk Castle, Denbighshire. He was less than five years old when his father, Roger, was killed in a duel with his cousin, Hugh Roberts, on 22 August 1661. Roger had been the son and heir of Sir Richard Grosvenor, 2nd Baronet, and therefore, Thomas succeeded to the baronetcy upon the death of his grandfather on 31 January 1665. He was eight years old at that time.

Grosvenor was educated by a private tutor, who also accompanied him when he undertook the Grand Tour, in his case, a three-year educational tour of France, Italy and the Levant, starting in 1670. On his return, he set about building a new house at Eaton. At that time, the family house was a medieval moated house. The new house was the first substantial one to be built, and it was constructed to the north of the older house. Grosvenor appointed the architect William Samwell to design it, and building started in 1675. By 1683, over £1,000 (£137,000 as of 2015) had been spent on the hall. The money for this venture came partly from the estates, and also from coal and lead mines, and from stone quarries in north Wales, that were owned by the family.

== Public life ==
Grosvenor played his part in public life. In 1677, he was granted the freedom of Chester, and later the same year, he became an alderman. Two years later, he was returned as a Member of Parliament (MP) for Chester for the first time, in what became known as the Habeas Corpus Parliament; in all, he was to serve in six parliaments. In 1685, he became Mayor of Chester, and later that year, raised a troop of horses to support James II in the Monmouth Rebellion. Grosvenor served as Sheriff of Cheshire in 1688–89.

== Family ==
Mary Davies was the great-grandniece of Hugh Audley (1577 - 1662), from whom she inherited part of the manor of Ebury (previously Eia) in Westminster. Mary's portion consisted of 'swampy meads' (marshland). In 1673 her family 'sold' her for £5,000 to be the bride of Charles Berkeley, son of George, 1st Earl of Berkeley. In 1677 Sir Thomas Grosvenor took over the contract and made Mary, then aged 12, his bride. The contract required they not cohabit for a year. The marriage proved to be harmonious and conventional. The land Mary brought to the marriage was later to become the Mayfair, Park Lane, and Belgravia areas of London; the most valuable parts of the Grosvenor Estate.

The couple had three daughters and five sons. Two of the sons, Thomas and Roger, died young; the other three sons all succeeded in turn to the baronetcy, Richard became the 4th Baronet, Thomas the 5th, and Robert the 6th. Two of the daughters, Elizabeth and Mary, also died young. Grosvenor died when Mary was eight months pregnant; she gave birth to a daughter, Ann, within a month.

Mary, Lady Grosvenor, had converted to Roman Catholicism shortly after coming of age. Because of this, and because Eaton Hall was used as a meeting place for Catholics, Grosvenor's loyalty to the king was questioned. However, he continued openly as an Anglican until his death in 1700, and he was buried in Eccleston church. Grosvenor's surviving sons were all under age at the time of his death; Sir Richard Myddelton, 3rd Baronet, and Thomas and Francis Cholmondeley were appointed as their guardians.

Mary was buried in the churchyard of St. Margaret's Church, Westminster, where in 1892, her tomb was the only one to be seen there, close to the north porch of the church.

Coat of arms of the Grosvenor Baronets, of Eaton (1622)

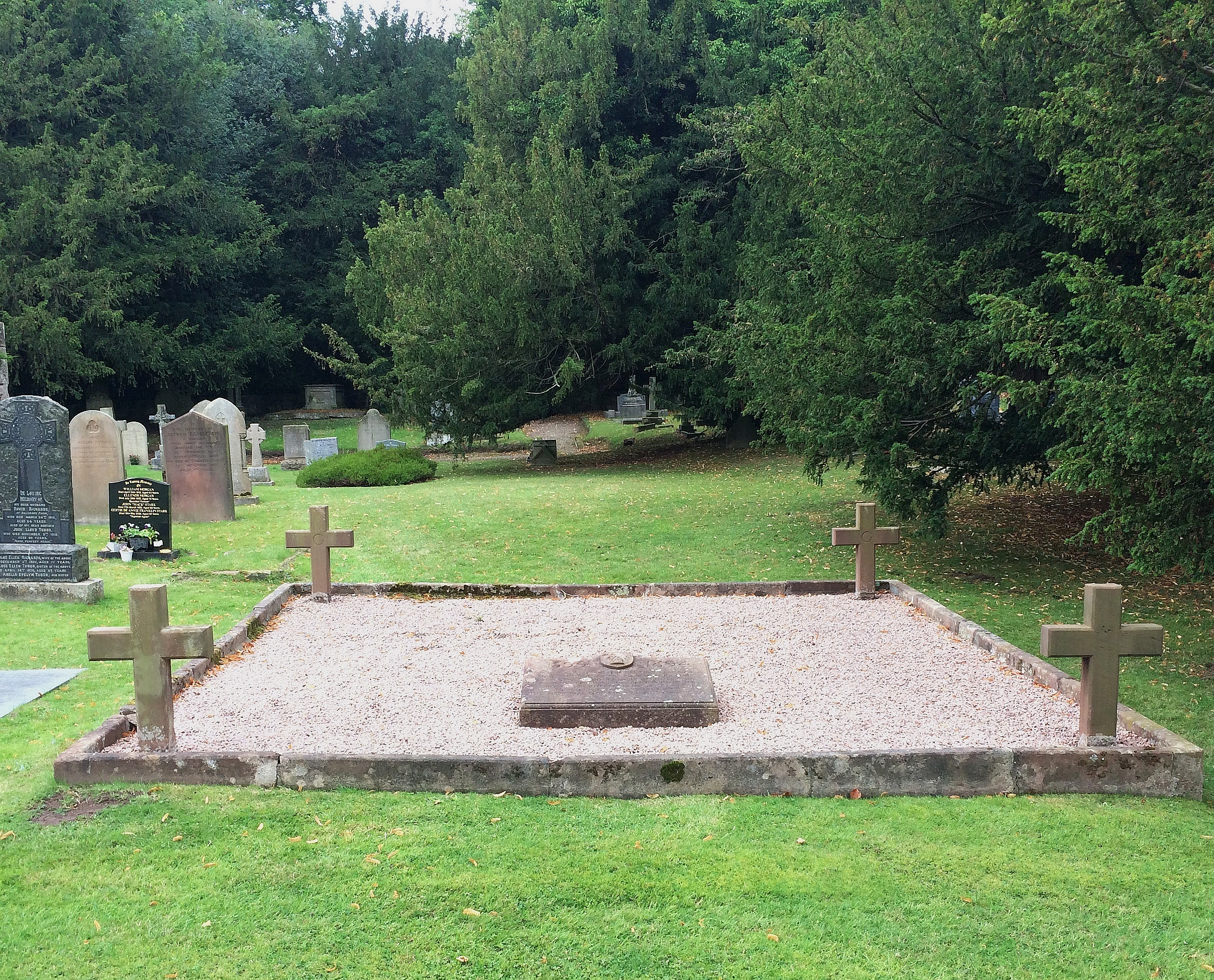
St Mary's Church, Eccleston – the enclosure which marks the site of the Grosvenor family vault within the demolished old church

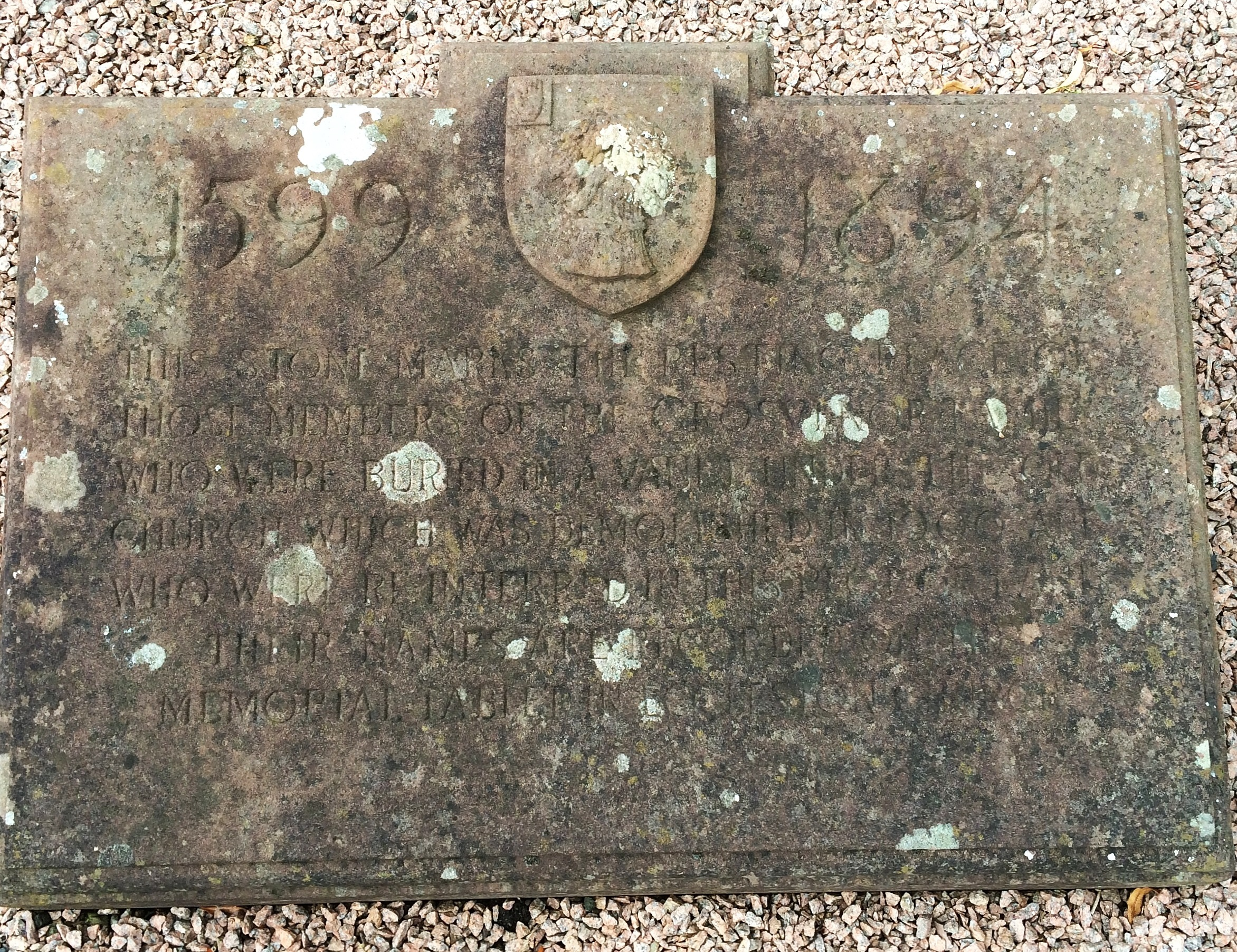
St Mary's Church, Eccleston – the tablet in the enclosure marking the site of the Grosvenor family vault within the old church

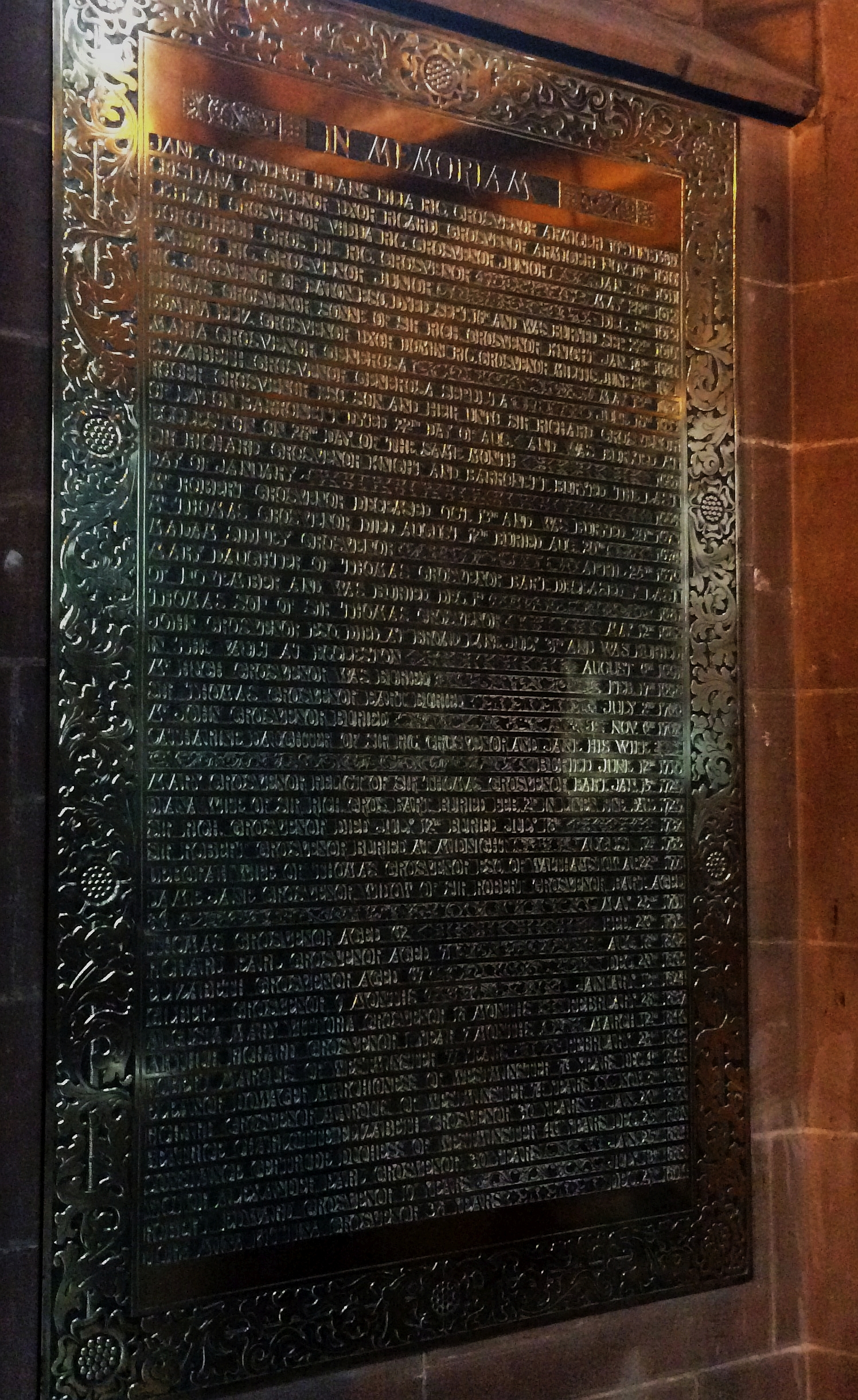
St Mary's Church, Eccleston – the tablet in the new church which lists the Grosvenors buried in the demolished old church

Parliament of England
Preceded by Robert Werden; William Williams	Member of Parliament for Chester; 1679–1681; With: William Williams	Succeeded by William Williams; Roger Whitley
Preceded by William Williams; Roger Whitley	Member of Parliament for Chester; 1685–1689; With: Robert Werden	Succeeded by Roger Whitley; George Mainwaring
Preceded by Roger Whitley; George Mainwaring	Member of Parliament for Chester; 1690–1700; With: Sir Richard Levinge 1690–1695; Roger Whitley 1695–1698; Thomas Cowper 1698; Peter Shakerley 1698–1700	Succeeded by Peter Shakerley; Sir Henry Bunbury, Bt
Baronetage of England
Preceded by Richard Grosvenor	Baronet (of Eaton); 1665–1700	Succeeded by Richard Grosvenor
