= Churton Hall =

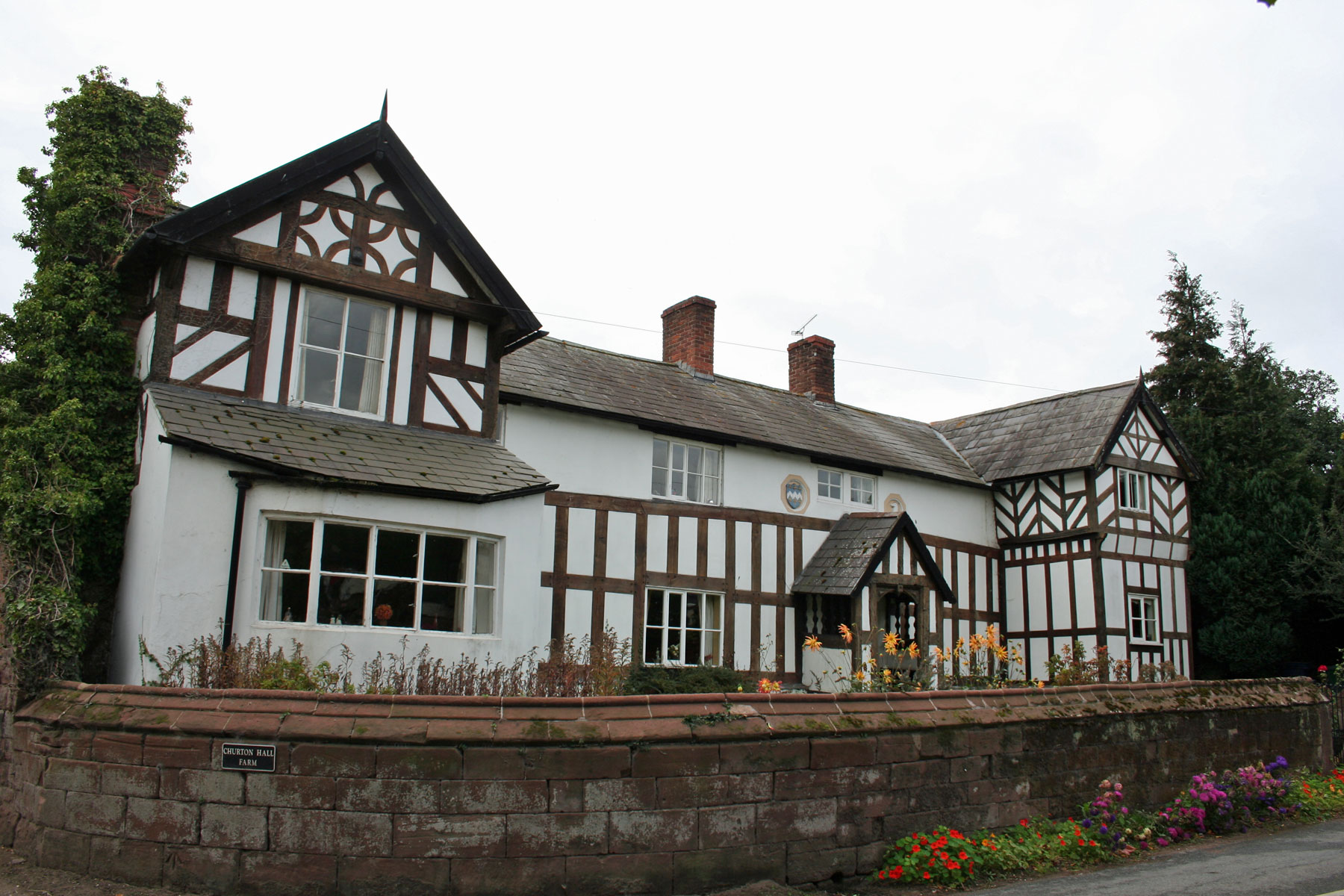
- Churton Hall in 2009

- Location in Cheshire
- 53.10195°N 2.86882°W
- Location: Churton by Farndon, Cheshire, England

Listed Building – Grade II
- Official name: Churton Hall
- Designated: 22 October 1952
- Reference no.: 1287224

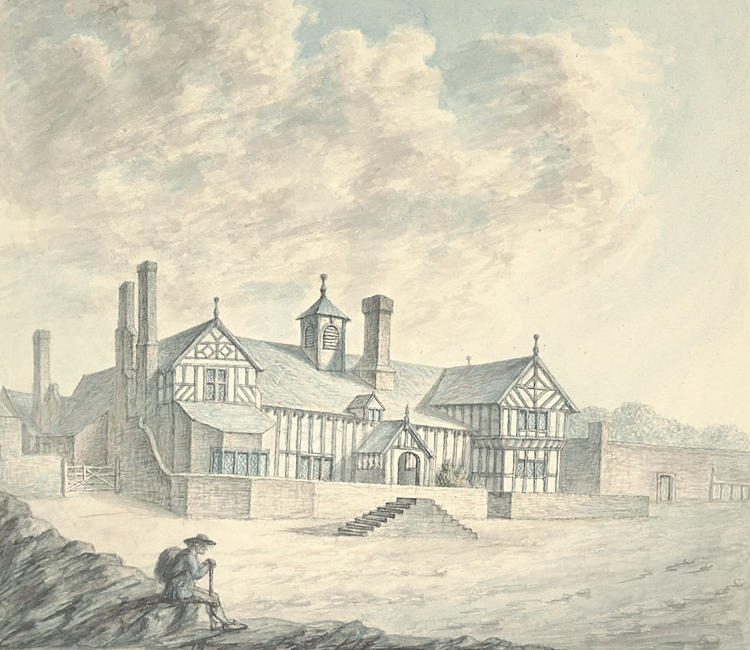
Churton Hall, 1793

not to be confused with Chirton Hall, Northumberland

Churton Hall is a country house in the parish of Churton, Cheshire, England. The date of building is uncertain. There is a loose board carrying the date 1569 that, according to the authors of the Buildings of England series, may or may not date the house. Dendrochronological analysis suggests that the timbers within the cruck structure of the house were felled in or around 1461, suggesting a 15th-century construction, and the 1569 date is thought to refer to the hall's gifting as a wedding present to William Barnston and his wife Elizabeth.

It is a half-timbered house built for the Barnston family, and was "heavily restored" in 1978–80. Much of the timber framing has been replaced by brick at the rear of the house. The house is roofed in slate. It has two storeys, and its plan is E-shaped. At each end of the building are gables with different designs. The house is recorded in the National Heritage List for England as a designated Grade II listed building.

The buildings were leased for three generations to a dairy-farming family following the Second World War, but the lease reverted to the Barnston Estate in February 2023. The estate has restored the original house and a 19th-century extension with the intention of leasing them as two homes.

== See also ==
- Listed buildings in Churton by Farndon
