= Upper Grosvenor Street =

Street in Mayfair, London

Coordinates: 51°30′37.48″N 0°9′14.54″W

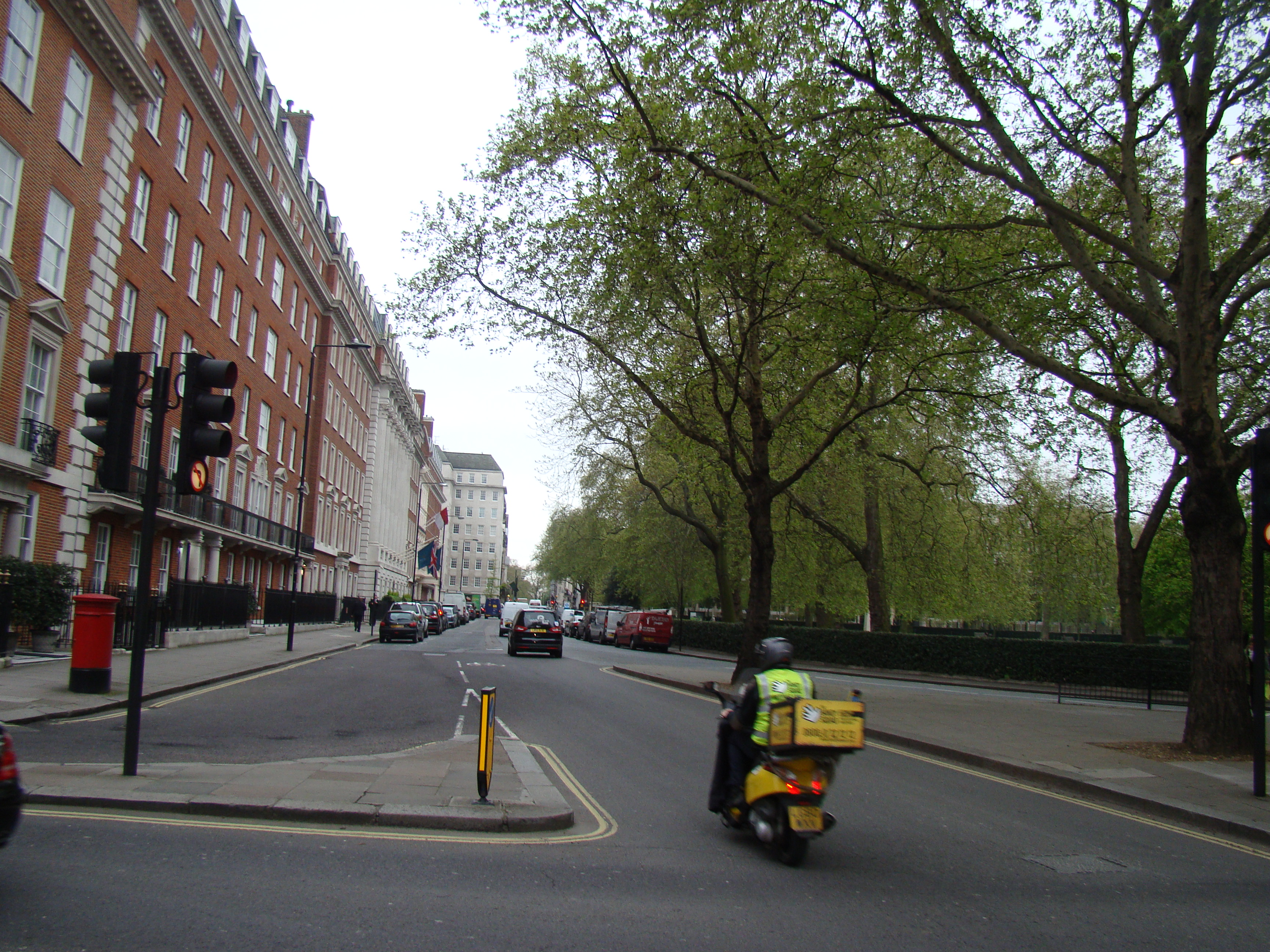
View along Upper Grosvenor Street from Carlos Place

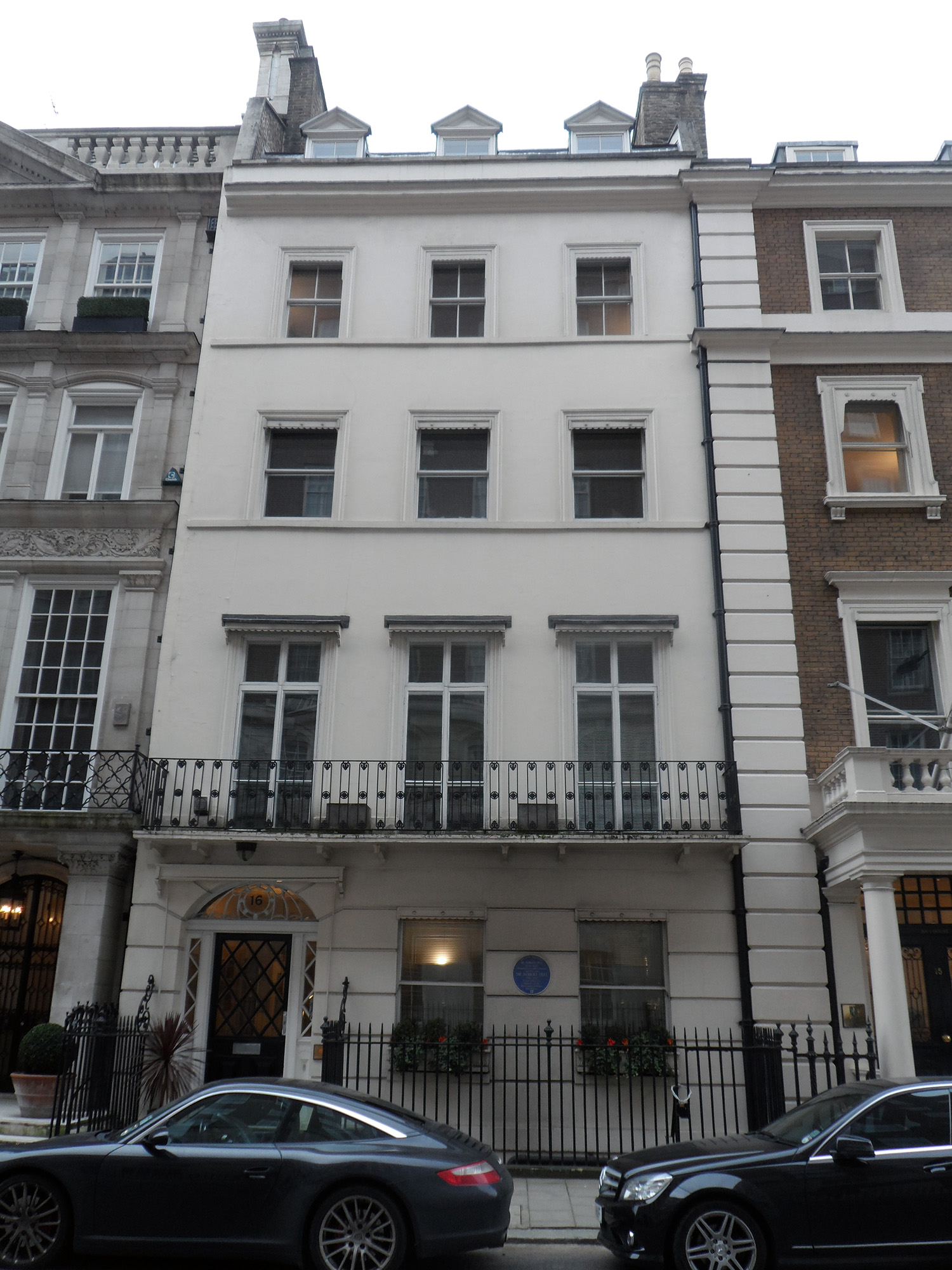
Former home of Sir Robert Peel – 16 Upper Grosvenor Street

Upper Grosvenor Street is a one-way Georgian street in Mayfair, London, United Kingdom. It runs from the north side of the Grosvenor House Hotel (fronting Park Lane) to the south side of the London Chancery Building (fronting Grosvenor Square); both have the longest frontage of their respective streets.

== Root ==
The senior branch of the Grosvenor family is in British nobility the Duke of Westminster's family and who enhanced their worth and status with several high nobility marriages and key investments in national projects and in London. The family have seen sensitively developed and kept the minor, overarching legal interest in most of their land locally – what were the fields of the quite large Middlesex parish of Westminster (in Ossulstone Hundred).

== Access and numbering ==
Vehicles access this westbound-only street mainly having passed along eastbound-only Upper Brook Street to the north and then passed three sides of Grosvenor Square (which has other points of access, away from the inner ring road formed by Park Lane). The street has one minor intersect, and a sub-minor intersect with Blackburne's Mews, only to the north, near the east end.

Much numbering is omitted due to the two very large buildings mentioned. This leaves numbers 6 to 23 that run from east to west, on the north side. No. 37 to No. 50 run in the opposite direction on the south side. Park Lane meets the street at about 2/3 of its length per its numbering (taken from its southern end) – immediately on the other side of the broad expanse of Park Lane (having a broken green central reservation) is Hyde Park, a few trees of which form the backdrop visible from the street, particularly the rise at the west end of the street.

== Notable organisations ==
- The Embassy of Monaco is based at No. 7.
- Odey Asset Management, a hedge fund run by Crispin Odey, occupies No. 12.
- The Arab British Chamber of Commerce, founded in 1975, occupies No. 43.
- Hamptons International Lettings, occupies much of the combined building at Nos. 49-50 – facing the statue of Ronald Reagan on the closest small (corner) green of Grosvenor Square.
