= Geoffrey Shakerley (1619–1696) =

English politician

Geoffrey Shakerley (20 April 1619 – 17 October 1696) was an English politician who sat as MP for Wigan in 1661. He is the father of Peter Shakerley, who also sat as MP for Wigan.

== Biography ==
Geoffrey Shakerley was the first son of Peter Shakerley and Margaret Oldfield. He was educated at Brasenose, Oxford in 1638. In 1640, he entered Gray's Inn. He married his first wife Katherine Pennington and had two sons and two daughters. She was buried on 4 April 1673. He married his second wife Jane Dolben and had two sons. She died on 16 May 1707.

Shakerley fought on the Royalist side during the English Civil War. After the war ended, he was fined for supporting the King and had his estates confiscated again in 1651. He also participated in the uprising led by Sir George Booth in 1659.

In 1661, he was elected for Wigan in the Cavalier Parliament and served on many committees. In 1663, he became governor of Chester Castle through the support of Henry Bennet, 1st Earl of Arlington. He died on 17 October 1696 and was buried at Nether Peover.
