= Sir Robert Grosvenor, 6th Baronet =

English politician

Member of Parliament for Chester
- In office 1733–1755

Personal details
- Born: 7 May 1695
- Died: 1 August 1755 (aged 60)
- Spouse: Jane Warre
- Children: 6, including Richard and Thomas
- Parents: Sir Thomas Grosvenor, 3rd Baronet (father); Mary Davies (mother)
- Education: Eton College

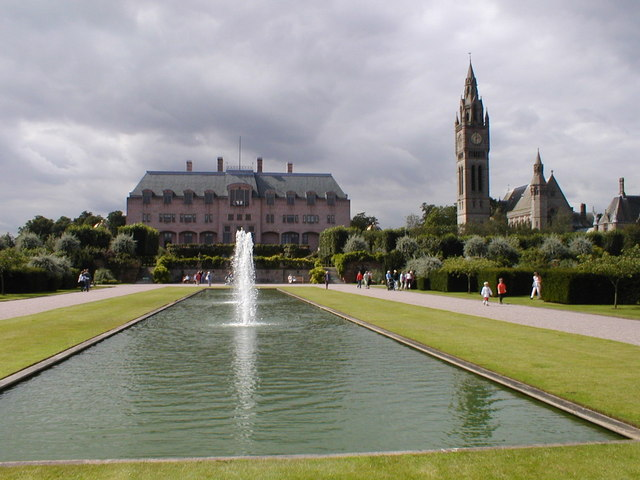
Eaton Hall

Arms of the Grosvenor Baronets

Sir Robert Grosvenor, 6th Baronet (7 May 1695 – 1 August 1755) of Eaton Hall, Cheshire, was an English politician who sat in the House of Commons from 1733 to 1755. He is an ancestor of the present Dukes of Westminster.

Grosvenor was the youngest surviving son of Sir Thomas Grosvenor, 3rd Baronet and his wife Mary Davies, daughter of Alexander Davies of Ebury, Middlesex. He was educated at Eton College, and matriculated at Brasenose College, Oxford in 1712. In 1716, he was admitted at the Inner Temple. He married Jane Warre, the daughter of John Warre of Swell Court and Shepton Beauchamp, Somerset on 21 May 1730. He succeeded to the baronetcy in 1733 after his elder brothers, Richard and Thomas both died without heirs. Having lived in Somerset, on succeeding to the baronetcy he moved to Eaton Hall, Cheshire.

Grosvenor was returned as Tory Member of Parliament for Chester at a by-election on 24 January 1733 and then at the 1734 British general election. Although a prominent Tory country gentleman, he never voted for any party according to the records. He was returned again unopposed in 1741 and at the top of a poll in 1747. At the 1754 British general election he was returned unopposed again for Chester.

Grosvenor died in August 1755 and had two sons (Richard and Thomas) and four daughters. He was succeeded by his elder son, Richard, the 7th baronet, who was created Baron Grosvenor in 1761 and Earl Grosvenor in 1784.

Parliament of Great Britain
| Preceded by Sir Richard Grosvenor; Thomas Grosvenor | Member of Parliament for the City of Chester; 1733–1755; With: Sir Thomas Grosvenor 1733; Sir Charles Bunbury 1733–1742; Philip Henry Warburton 1742–1754; Richard Grosvenor 1754–1755 | Succeeded by Richard Grosvenor; Thomas Grosvenor |
Baronetage of England
| Preceded by Thomas Grosvenor | Baronet (of Eaton); 1733–1755 | Succeeded by Richard Grosvenor |
