= Churton by Farndon =

Former civil parish in Cheshire, England

Coordinates: 53.094°N 2.868°W

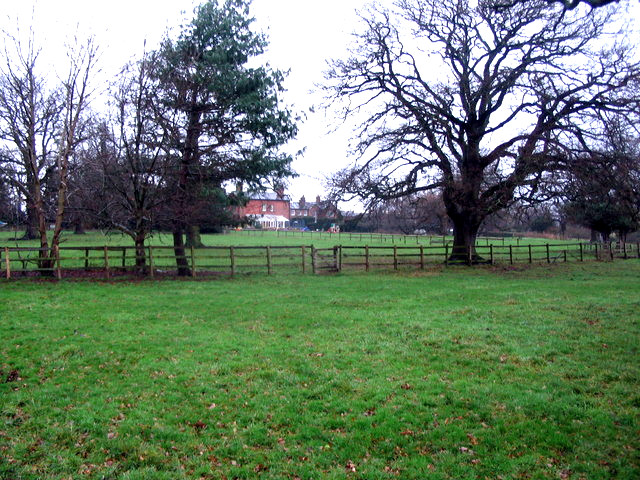
- Sibbersfield Hall

- Location within Cheshire
- Population: 153 (2011)
- OS grid reference: SJ4255
- Civil parish: Churton
- Unitary authority: Cheshire West and Chester
- Ceremonial county: Cheshire
- Region: North West
- Country: England
- Sovereign state: United Kingdom
- Post town: CHESTER
- Postcode district: CH3
- Dialling code: 01829
- Police: Cheshire
- Fire: Cheshire
- Ambulance: North West
- UK Parliament: Chester South and Eddisbury

Churton by Farndon is a former civil parish, now in the parish of Churton, in the borough of Cheshire West and Chester and ceremonial county of Cheshire in England. In 2001, it had a population of 14 increasing to 153 at the 2011 Census. The parish included the southern part of the village of Churton (the northern part was in the adjacent parish of Churton by Aldford).

== History ==
Churton by Farndon was formerly a township in the parish of Farndon, in 1866 Churton by Farndon became a separate civil parish, on 1 April 2015 the parish was abolished to form Churton.

== See also ==
- Listed buildings in Churton by Farndon
- Churton Hall
