= Edgerley, Cheshire =

Former civil parish in Cheshire, England

Coordinates: 53.105°N 2.846°W

Edgerley
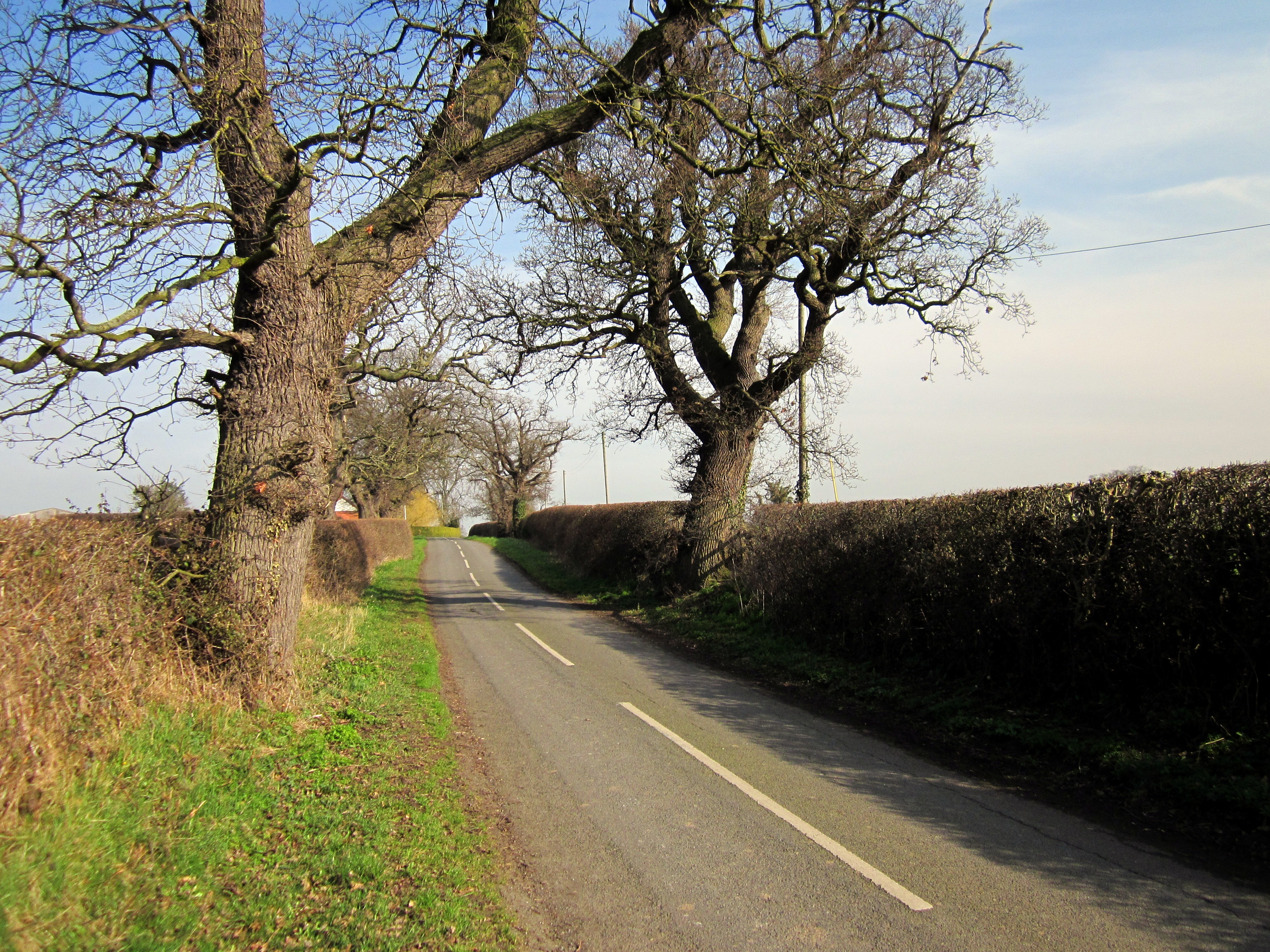
- Edgerley Lane, near Churton

- Location within Cheshire
- Population: 7 (2001)
- OS grid reference: SJ434568
- Civil parish: Churton
- Unitary authority: Cheshire West and Chester
- Ceremonial county: Cheshire
- Region: North West
- Country: England
- Sovereign state: United Kingdom
- Post town: CHESTER
- Postcode district: CH3 6
- Dialling code: 01829
- Police: Cheshire
- Fire: Cheshire
- Ambulance: North West
- UK Parliament: Chester South and Eddisbury

Edgerley is a former civil parish, now in the parish of Churton, in the borough of Cheshire West and Chester and ceremonial county of Cheshire in England. In 2001 it had a population of 7.

== History ==
The name "Edgerley" means 'Ecghere's wood/clearing'. Edgerley was formerly a township in the parish of Aldford, in 1866 Edgerley became a separate civil parish, and on 1 April 2015 the parish was abolished to form Churton.
