= Churton by Aldford =

Former civil parish in Cheshire, England

Coordinates: 53.102°N 2.872°W

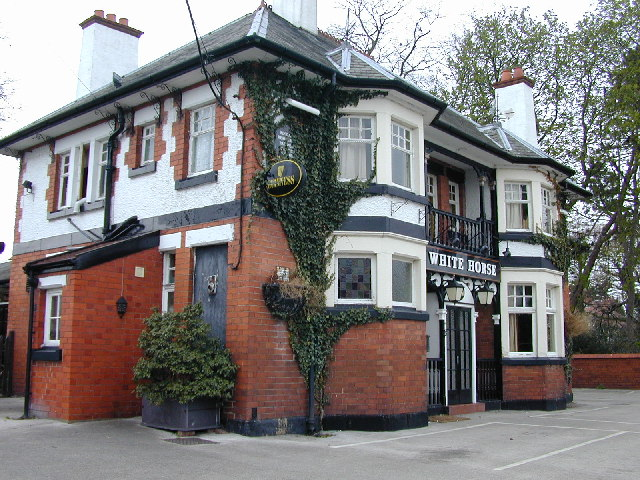
- White Horse

- Location within Cheshire
- Population: 136 (2001)
- OS grid reference: SJ4156
- Civil parish: Churton
- Unitary authority: Cheshire West and Chester
- Ceremonial county: Cheshire
- Region: North West
- Country: England
- Sovereign state: United Kingdom
- Post town: CHESTER
- Postcode district: CH3
- Dialling code: 01829
- Police: Cheshire
- Fire: Cheshire
- Ambulance: North West
- UK Parliament: Chester South and Eddisbury

Churton by Aldford is a former civil parish, now in the parish of Churton, in the borough of Cheshire West and Chester and ceremonial county of Cheshire in England. In 2001 it had a population of 136. The parish included the northern part of the village of Churton (the southern part was in the neighbouring parish of Churton by Farndon). It is associated with the nearby Church of England parish of St John the Baptist, Aldford, the nearest place of public worship.

Church House Farm (now a collection of private residences called Churchmead) was built in 1682. Land to the north of the village forms part of the Duke of Westminster's Eaton Estate and is largely farmed by Grosvenor Farms. There is one village pub – The White Horse.

== History ==
The origins for the division of Churton into two townships goes back to the 11th century. It has been suggested that in 1086 Aldford was originally part of the moiety of the manor held by Earl Edwin and Bigot. Churton by Farndon was a moiety belonging to the Bishop of Chester. The west–east dividing line of this ecclesiastical boundary is followed by the streets of Knowl Lane, Hob Lane, and Pump Lane. The separation of the Aldford moiety into a district parish probably took place early in the 12th century when, at the time, Churton was also believed to have divided by a parish boundary along the lines of a manorial border. Until the early 20th century, the remains of steps of an ancient cross, which marked the boundaries of the manors of Aldford and Farndon, could still be seen. These steps were situated at the confluence of Pump Lane and the main road through the village. There is no trace of this boundary marker today.

Churton by Aldford was formerly a township in the parish of Aldford, in 1866 Churton by Aldford became a separate civil parish, on 1 April 2015 it was abolished to form Churton.

== See also ==
- Listed buildings in Churton by Aldford
