= Sir Richard Grosvenor, 1st Baronet =

English politician

Sir Richard Grosvenor Bt

Personal details
- Born: 9 January 1585 Eaton Hall, Cheshire, England
- Died: 14 September 1645 (aged 60)
- Resting place: St Mary's Church, Eccleston, Cheshire, England

Sir Richard Grosvenor, 1st Baronet (9 January 1585 – 14 September 1645) was an English politician who sat in the House of Commons at various times between 1621 and 1629. He is an ancestor of the modern day Dukes of Westminster.

Grosvenor was born at Eaton Hall, Cheshire, reportedly the only surviving male child of 17 children. His father was Richard Grosvenor of Eaton, and his mother was Christian, the daughter of Sir Richard Brooke of Norton Priory, Cheshire. His early education was by John Bruen, a local puritan and at the age of 13 he went to The Queen's College, Oxford. He matriculated in 1599 and graduated BA on 30 June 1602.

== Political career ==
In 1602 Grosvenor was High Sheriff of Cheshire. He was knighted by James I in Vale Royal on 24 August 1617. In 1621, he was elected Member of Parliament for Cheshire. He was created baronet on 23 February 1622. In 1623, he was High Sheriff of Cheshire again and, in 1625, High Sheriff of Denbighshire. He was re-elected MP for Cheshire in 1626 and 1628, and sat until 1629 when King Charles decided to rule without parliament for eleven years. His diary-taking has been described as meticulous and it is thought his diary taking represents some of the most complete accounts of Parliamentary debate from the period.

== Incarceration ==
Grosvenor stood surety for the debts of his brother-in-law, Sir Peter Daniell, but, in 1629, Daniell defaulted on his debts, and for almost ten years Grosvenor was incarcerated in the Fleet Prison.

Sir Richard Grosvenor died in Eaton Hall in 1645 and was buried in Eccleston Church.

== Family ==
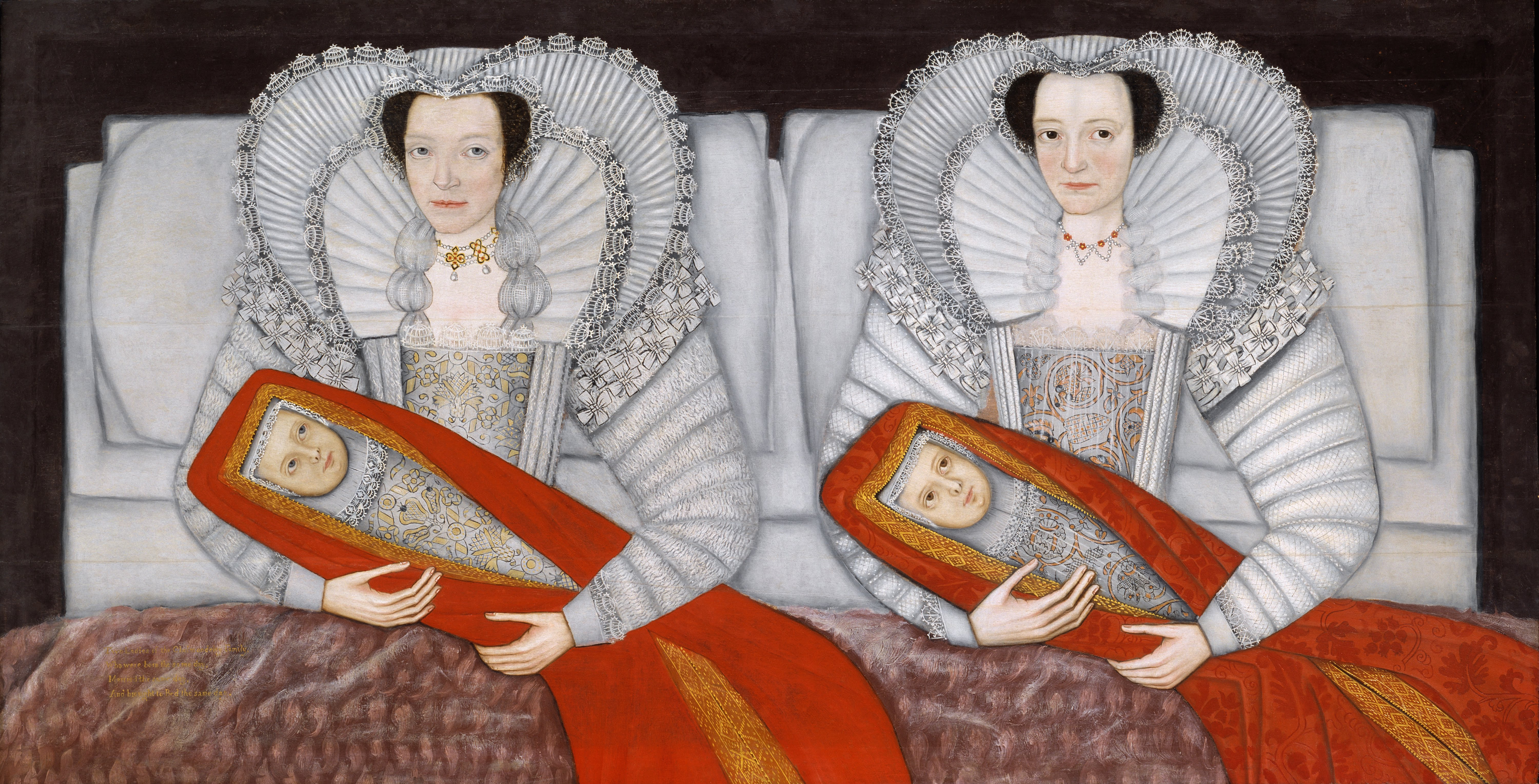
Lettice, Lady Grosvenor, and her sister, Mary, Lady Calverley, ca. 1604

Grosvenor married three times:

- His first marriage was in 1600, to Lettice Cholmondeley, of Cholmondeley, Cheshire. With her, he had a son and three daughters including:
  - Sir Richard Grosvenor, 2nd Baronet who succeeded in the baronetcy.

Lettice died in 1612 and two years later

- he married Elizabeth Wilbraham, the daughter of Sir Thomas Wilbraham of Woodhey, Cheshire.

Following her death in 1621

- he married Elizabeth Warburton, daughter and sole heiress of Sir Peter Warburton of Grafton, also in Cheshire.

His third wife died in 1627.

Coat of arms of the Grosvenor Baronets, of Eaton (1622)

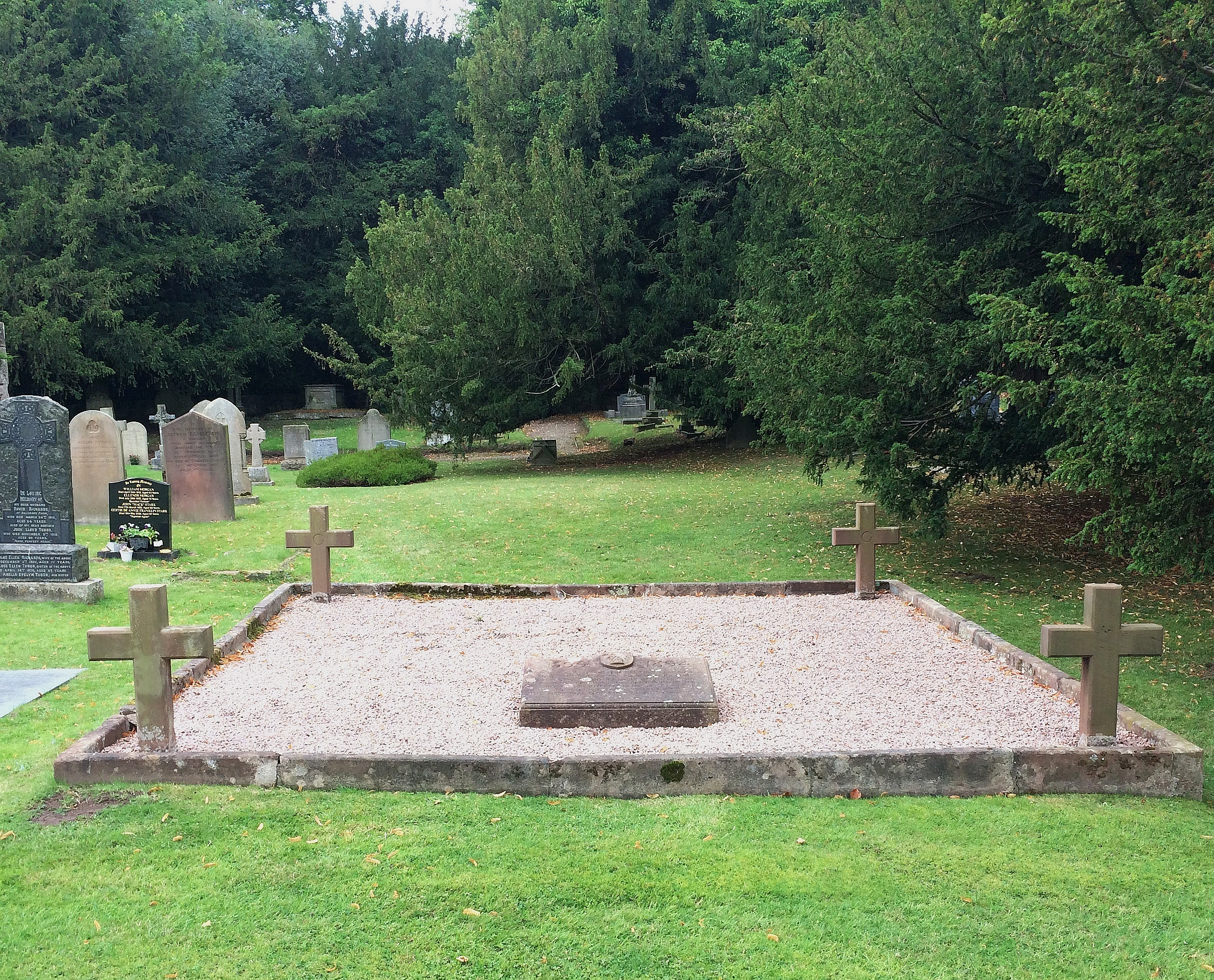
St Mary's Church, Eccleston – The enclosure which marks the site of the Grosvenor family vault within the demolished old church

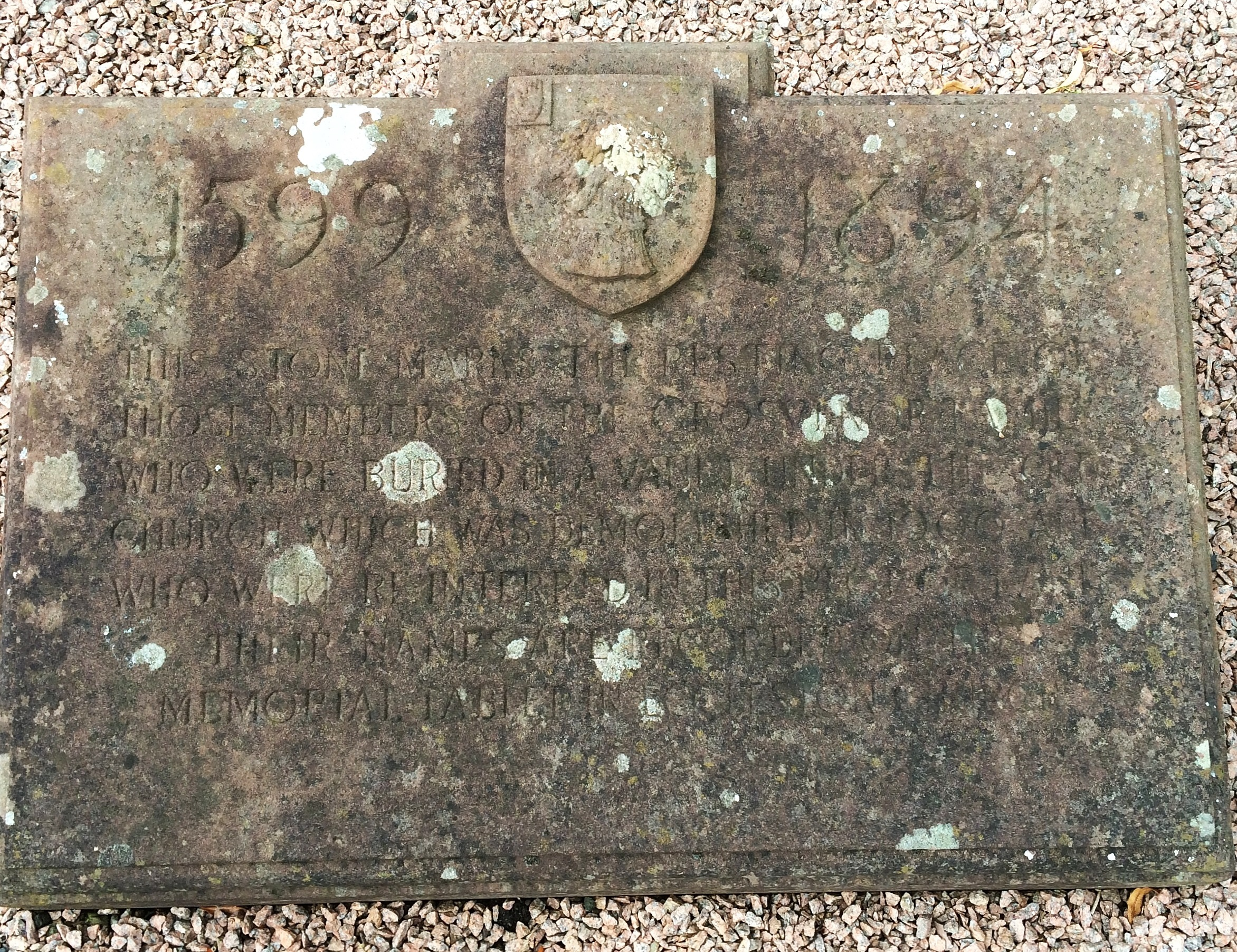
St Mary's Church, Eccleston – The tablet in the enclosure marking the site of the Grosvenor family vault within the old church

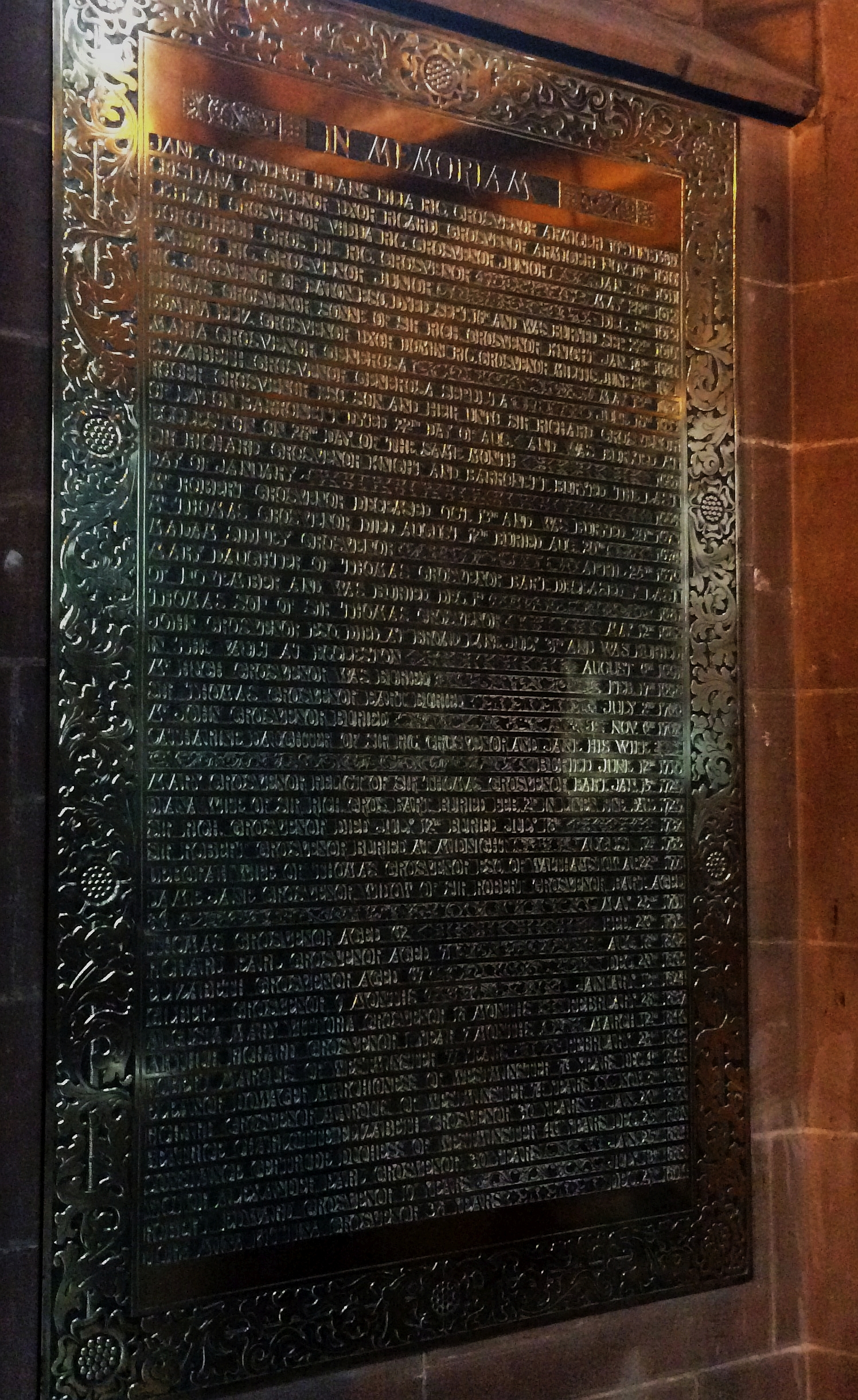
St Mary's Church, Eccleston – The tablet in the new church which lists the Grosvenors buried in the demolished old church

Parliament of England
Preceded by Sir William Brereton; Sir Roger Wilbraham	Member of Parliament for Cheshire; 1621–1624; With: Sir William Brereton	Succeeded by William Booth; William Brereton
Preceded by Sir Robert Cholmondeley, Bt; Sir Anthony St John	Member of Parliament for Cheshire; 1626–1629; With: Peter Daniell 1626; Sir William Brereton, Bt 1628–1629	Parliament suspended until 1640
Baronetage of England
New creation	Baronet (of Eaton); 1622–1645	Succeeded by Richard Grosvenor
