= Sir Thomas Grosvenor, 5th Baronet =

English politician

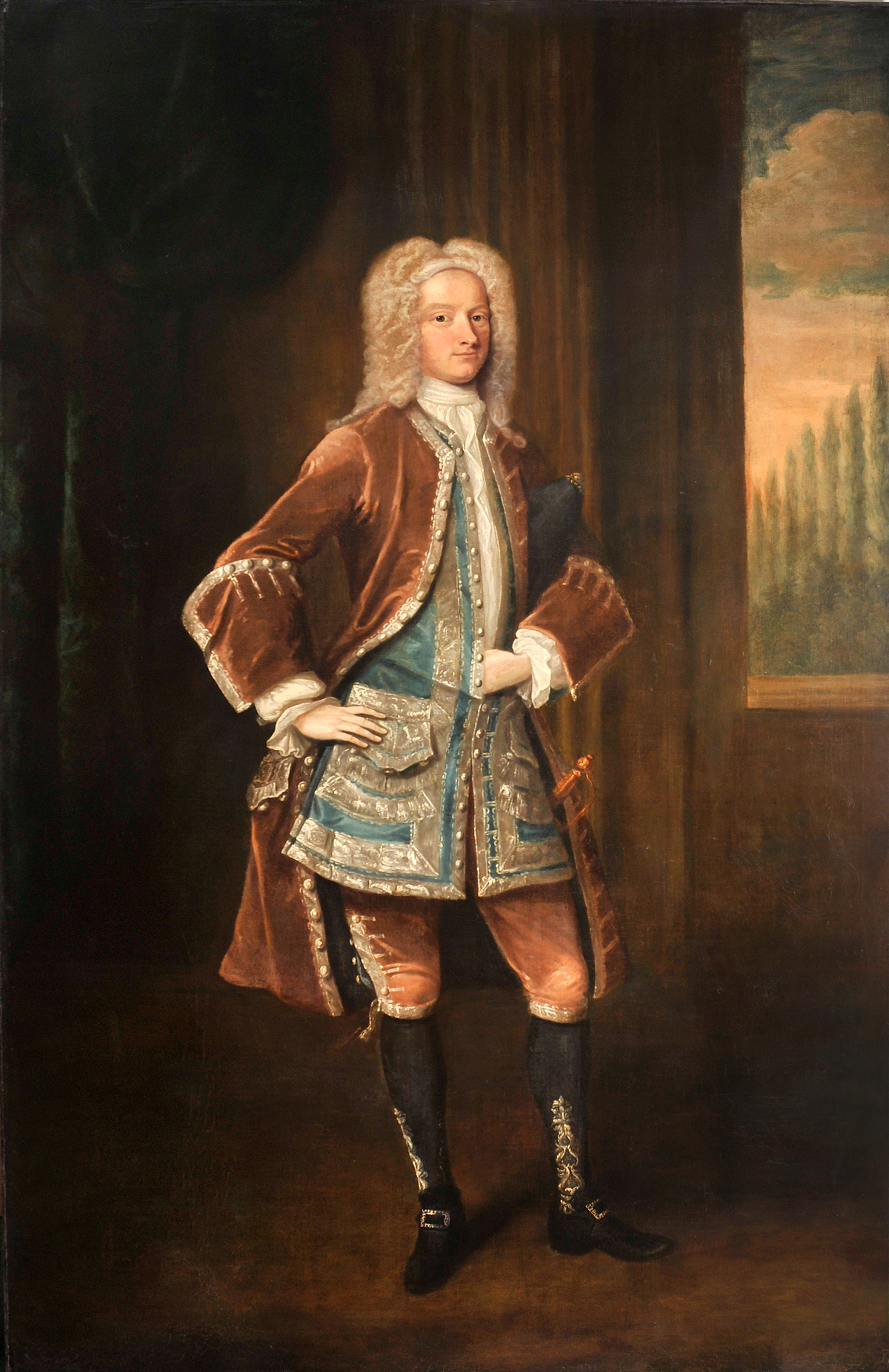
Sir Richard Grosvenor, 5th Baronet of Eaton

Sir Thomas Grosvenor, 5th Baronet (1693 – February 1733) was an English Member of Parliament.

Thomas Grosvenor was the second surviving son of Sir Thomas Grosvenor, 3rd Baronet. His two oldest brothers had died young. and his elder surviving brother Richard became the 4th Baronet.

In 1727 Richard and Thomas won the two parliamentary seats for the city of Chester.

Thomas succeeded to the baronetcy when Richard died in July 1732. However, by that time he was already very ill with tuberculosis himself and, having been advised to travel to Italy, died in Naples in the following February. Having no children, he was succeeded by his younger brother Robert.

Parliament of Great Britain
Preceded by Sir Henry Bunbury; Sir Richard Grosvenor	Member of Parliament for the City of Chester; 1727–1733; With: Sir Richard Grosvenor 1727–1733; Robert Grosvenor 1733	Succeeded by Sir Robert Grosvenor; Charles Bunbury
Baronetage of England
Preceded by Richard Grosvenor	Baronet (of Eaton); 1732–1733	Succeeded by Robert Grosvenor
