= Duke of Westminster =

Title in the Peerage of the United Kingdom

Dukedom of Westminster
- Quarterly: 1st and 4th, Azure a Portcullis with chains pendant Or on a Chief of the last between two united Roses of York and Lancaster a Pale charged with the Arms of King Edward the Confessor (City of Westminster); 2nd and 3rd, Azure a Garb Or (Grosvenor).
- Creation date: 27 February 1874
- Created by: Queen Victoria
- Peerage: Peerage of the United Kingdom
- First holder: Hugh Grosvenor, 3rd Marquess of Westminster
- Present holder: Hugh Grosvenor, 7th Duke of Westminster
- Heir apparent: None
- Remainder to: 1st Duke's heirs male of the body lawfully begotten
- Subsidiary titles: Marquess of Westminster; Earl Grosvenor; Viscount Belgrave; Baron Grosvenor; Baronet, of Eaton
- Seats: Eaton Hall and Abbeystead House
- Motto: VIRTUS NON STEMMA (Virtue, not ancestry)

Grosvenor Baronets
- Azure, a garb Or, with canton of baronet
- Creation date: 1622
- Created by: King James VI and I
- Baronetage: Baronetage of England
- First holder: Richard Grosvenor
- Present holder: Hugh Grosvenor, 7th Duke of Westminster
- Remainder to: 1st Baronet's heirs male of the body lawfully begotten

Duke of Westminster is a title in the Peerage of the United Kingdom. It was created by Queen Victoria in 1874 and bestowed upon Hugh Grosvenor, 3rd Marquess of Westminster. It is the most recent dukedom conferred on someone not related to the British royal family.

The 2nd, 3rd, 4th and 5th Dukes were each grandsons of the first. The present holder of the title is Hugh Grosvenor, the 7th Duke, who inherited the dukedom on 9 August 2016 on the death of his father, Gerald. The present duke is a godfather of Prince George of Wales.

== History of the Grosvenor family ==
The Grosvenors claim Norman descent, and were said to be related to Hugh, Earl of Chester. A knightly member of the family, Sir Robert Grosvenor, was involved in the famous 1389 heraldic lawsuit Scrope v Grosvenor.

Sir Richard Grosvenor was created Baronet of Eaton in January 1622. Sir Richard Grosvenor, the 7th Baronet, was created Baron Grosvenor in 1761, and in 1784 became both Viscount Belgrave (Belgrave, Cheshire) and Earl Grosvenor under George III. The title Marquess of Westminster was bestowed upon Robert Grosvenor, the 2nd Earl Grosvenor, at the coronation of William IV in 1831.

In 1677 Sir Thomas Grosvenor took over the contract to marry Mary Davies, then aged 12, who was heir to 500 acres (200 hectares) of swampy land to the west of the boundary of London.

The subsidiary titles are: Marquess of Westminster (created 1831), Earl Grosvenor (1784), Viscount Belgrave, of Belgrave in the County of Chester (1784), and Baron Grosvenor, of Eaton in the County of Chester (1761). The Dukedom and Marquessate are in the Peerage of the United Kingdom; the rest are in the Peerage of Great Britain. The courtesy title of the eldest son and heir to the Duke is Earl Grosvenor.

== Estates and residences ==
=== Country seats ===
The Duke of Westminster's seats are at Eaton Hall, Cheshire, and at Abbeystead House, Lancashire. Halkyn Castle was built as a sporting lodge for the family in the early 1800s.

The traditional burial place of the Dukes is the Old Churchyard adjacent to St Mary's Church, Eccleston.

==== Country landholdings ====
In the 1883 edition of John Bateman's The Great Landowners of Great Britain and Ireland, Hugh Grosvenor, 1st Duke of Westminster's estates outside London were recorded as spanning 19,749 acres across England and Wales, including 15,138 acres in Cheshire, 3,621 acres in Flintshire, 744 acres in Denbighshire, and 246 acres in Buckinghamshire, which produced a combined annual income of £38,994.

Bateman noted that the figure given for the Duke's total income included house property in Chester, for which no acreage was stated, but excluded the Duke's extensive property in metropolitan London.

Bateman separately recorded the estates of the Duke's mother, Elizabeth, Dowager Marchioness of Westminster, as comprising 12,906 acres, including 8,794 acres in Dorset and 4,112 acres in Wiltshire, yielding a combined annual income of £26,958. These properties formed part of the Grosvenor family's south-western estates centred on Motcombe, and did not ultimately descend with the dukedom: the Motcombe and neighbouring Stalbridge estates passed instead to the Dowager Marchioness's younger son, Richard Grosvenor, 1st Baron Stalbridge.

=== London residences ===
In 1805 Robert Grosvenor, 1st Marquess of Westminster purchased Gloucester House in Upper Grosvenor Street, Mayfair from Prince William Henry, Duke of Gloucester and Edinburgh for £20,000. Lord Westminster took up residence at the property in 1808, after which the property became known as Grosvenor House. The house underwent a series of renovations and extensions during the 1800s; Hugh Grosvenor, 3rd Marquess of Westminster (later 1st Duke of Westminster) inherited the house following his father's death in 1869, by which time Grosvenor House had become one of the largest and grandest private houses in London.

The 1st Duke was predeceased by his eldest son Victor, Earl Grosvenor, who died in 1884; in 1885 the 1st Duke reserved one of the Grosvenor Estate houses in London, No. 35 Park Lane for the use of his widowed daughter-in-law Sibell, Countess Grosvenor. The house underwent £12,000 worth of renovations from 1885-86, and in 1887 Sibell took up residence at the house, where she lived with her three young children Lady Constance Grosvenor, Lady Lettice Grosvenor, Hugh, Earl Grosvenor (later 2nd Duke of Westminster), and her second husband George Wyndham. Sibell continued to reside at 35 Park Lane until her death in 1929; the house was later re-numbered as 99 Park Lane.

Following the 1st Duke's death in December 1899 Grosvenor House was inherited by his grandson Hugh Grosvenor, 2nd Duke of Westminster, who continued to maintain the house as his London residence prior to the outbreak of World War I in 1914. By December 1916 the House had ceased to be used as a private residence, and was requisitioned by the British Government as offices for sections of the Ministry of Food. Following the conclusion of the War the 2nd Duke did not resume occupation of Grosvenor House; his second-cousin George Sutherland-Leveson-Gower, 5th Duke of Sutherland reportedly expressed some interest in leasing Grosvenor House, but it was instead eventually leased to the Dowager Lady Michelham in 1919. In 1924 the lease of Grosvenor House was purchased by William Lever, 1st Viscount Leverhulme who planned to turn the property into a National Art Gallery; however his death in 1925 prevented this. Grosvenor House was later demolished in 1927 and replaced by the Grosvenor House Hotel, which opened in 1929.

Following the closure of Grosvenor House, the 2nd Duke used a smaller house on the Grosvenor Estate, Bourdon House on the corner of Davies Street and Bourdon Street in Mayfair as his London residence from 1917, which continued to be his London home until his death in 1953. His widowed fourth wife, Anne Grosvenor, Duchess of Westminster continued to occupy the house until 1957.

Robert Grosvenor, 5th Duke of Westminster maintained an apartment at No. 100 Eaton Square from c. 1970 until his death in 1979, which continued to be used as the London residence of his son Gerald Grosvenor, 6th Duke of Westminster as of 2015.

London residences of the Dukes of Westminster

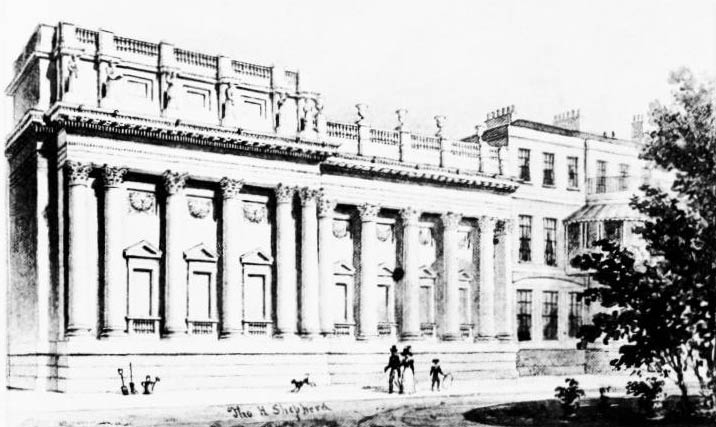
Grosvenor House, No. 33 Upper Grosvenor Street, the London residence of the Marquesses and Dukes of Westminster from 1808 to 1916.

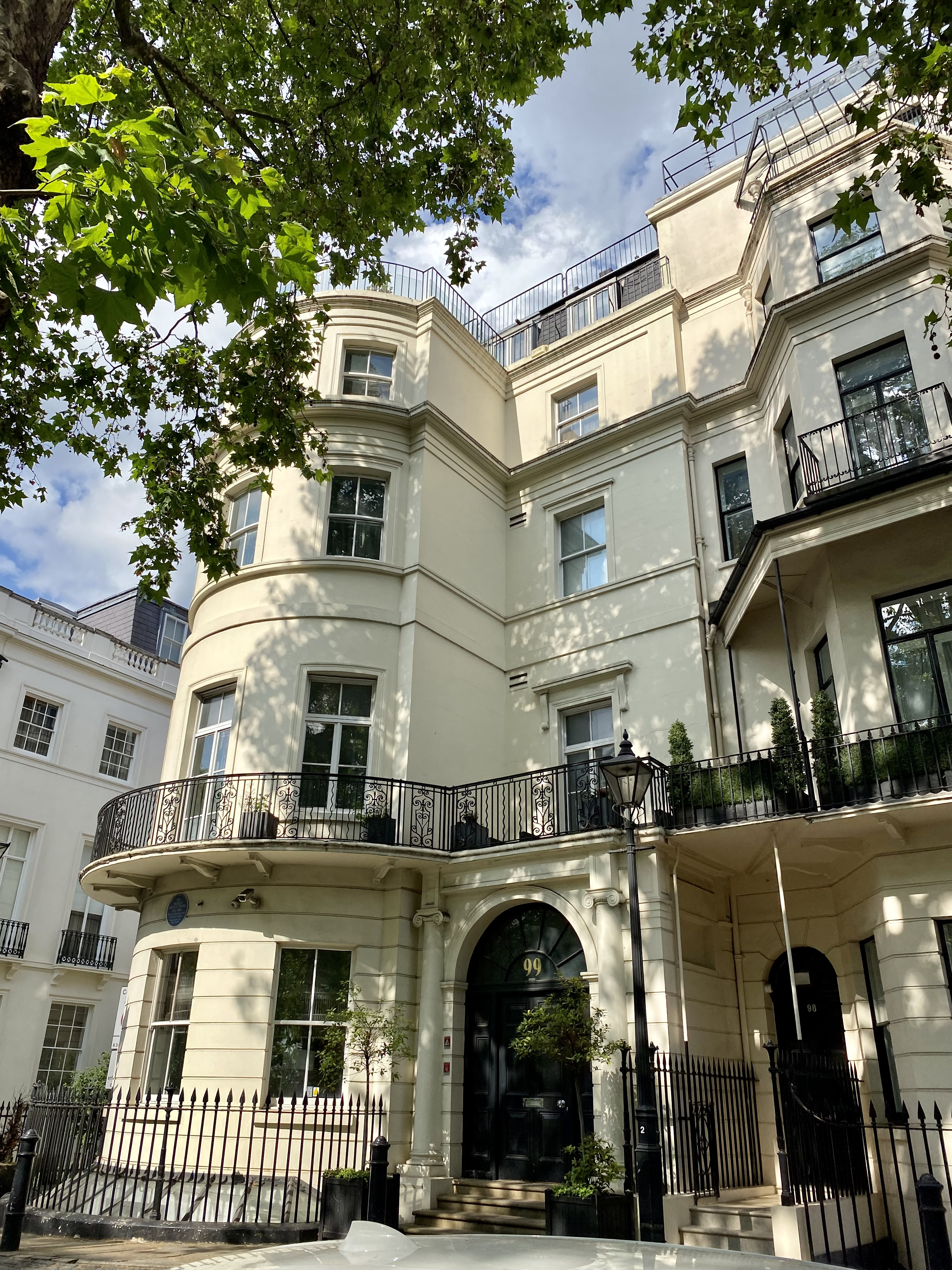
No. 99 Park Lane (formerly No. 35), granted to the widowed Sibell, Countess Grosvenor from 1885 to 1929, and childhood home of her son Hugh, Earl Grosvenor (later 2nd Duke of Westminster).

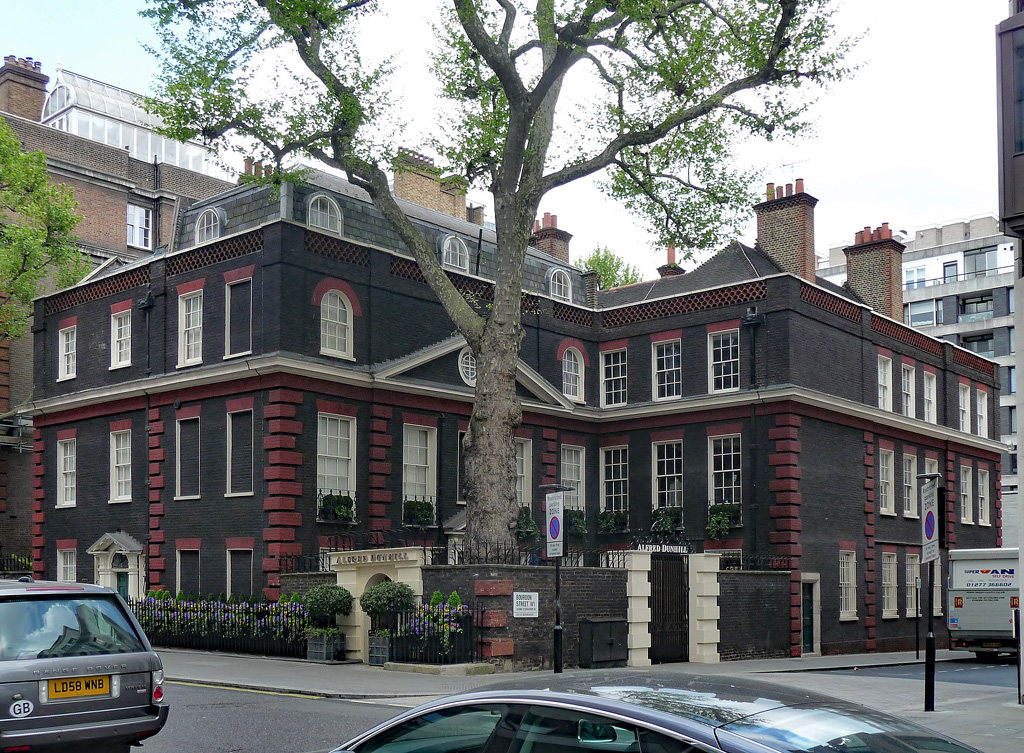
Bourdon House, Davies Street, the London residence of the 2nd Duke of Westminster from 1917 to 1953.

== Grosvenor Baronets, of Eaton (1622) ==
- Sir Richard Grosvenor, 1st Baronet (1584–1645) was an MP
- Sir Richard Grosvenor, 2nd Baronet (1604–1664), a son of the 1st Baronet
  - Roger Grosvenor (c. 1628–1661), a son of the 2nd Baronet, predeceased his father
- Sir Thomas Grosvenor, 3rd Baronet (1656–1700), son of Roger
- Sir Richard Grosvenor, 4th Baronet (1689–1732), eldest son of the 3rd Baronet, died without issue
- Sir Thomas Grosvenor, 5th Baronet (1693–1733), second son of the 3rd Baronet, died unmarried
- Sir Robert Grosvenor, 6th Baronet (1695–1755), third and youngest son of the 3rd Baronet
- Sir Richard Grosvenor, 7th Baronet (1731–1802) (created Baron Grosvenor in 1761)

== Barons Grosvenor (1761) ==
Created by George III of Great Britain
#	Name (lifespan)	Period	Spouse	Notes	Other titles
1st	Richard Grosvenor (1731–1802)	1761–1802	Henrietta Vernon	Later created Earl Grosvenor	—

== Earls Grosvenor (1784) ==
Created by George III of Great Britain
#	Name (lifespan)	Period	Spouse	Notes	Other titles
1st	Richard Grosvenor (1731–1802)	1784–1802	Henrietta Vernon	Already Baron Grosvenor	Viscount Belgrave, Baron Grosvenor
2nd	Robert Grosvenor (1767–1845)	1802–1845	Eleanor Egerton	Son of the preceding, later created Marquess of Westminster	Viscount Belgrave, Baron Grosvenor

== Marquesses of Westminster (1831) ==
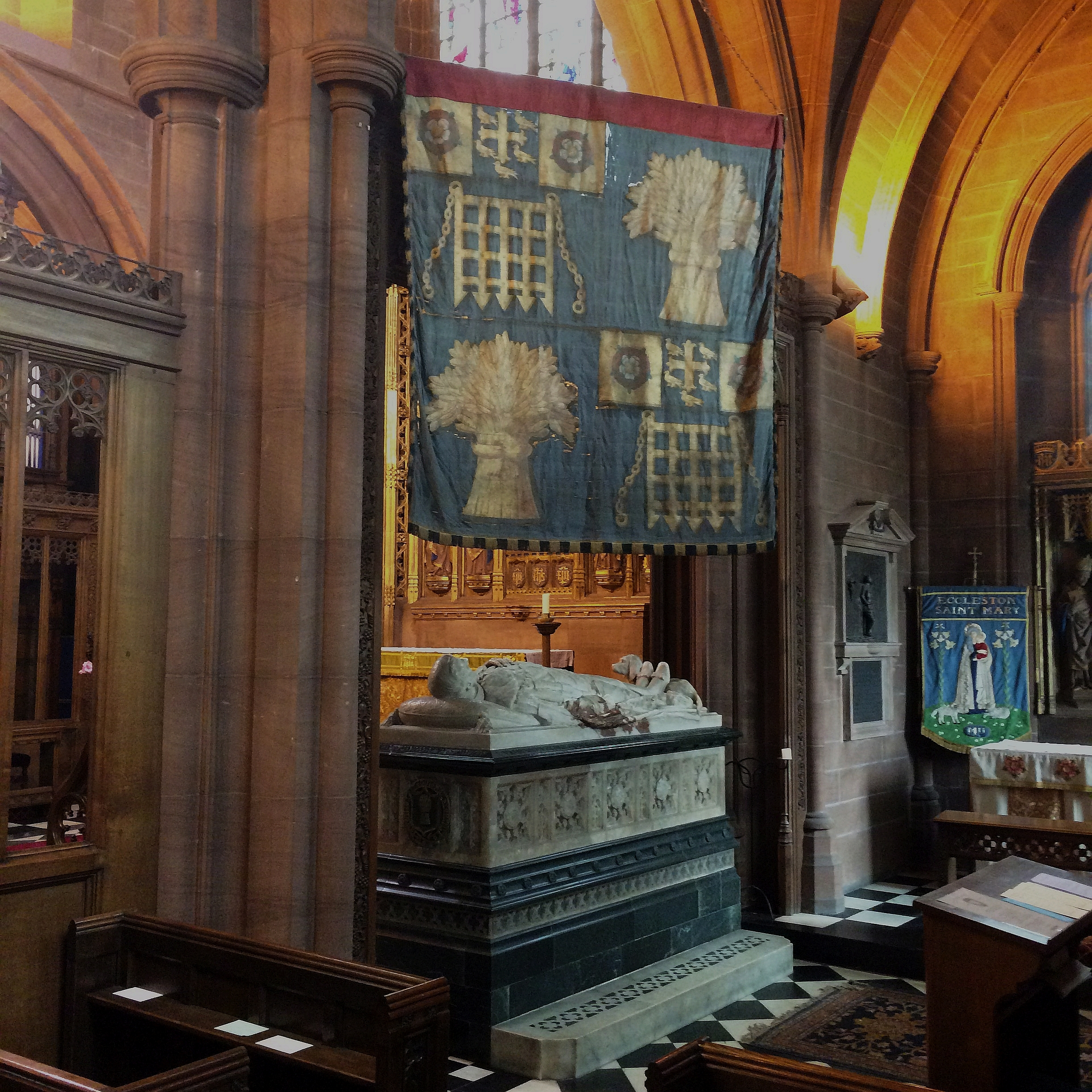
St Mary's Church, Eccleston, Grosvenor Chapel: Cenotaph and Garter banner of Hugh Grosvenor, 1st Duke of Westminster

Created by William IV of the United Kingdom
#	Name (lifespan)	Period	Spouse	Notes	Other titles
1st	Robert Grosvenor (1767–1845)	1831–1845	Eleanor Egerton	Already Earl Grosvenor	Earl Grosvenor; Viscount Belgrave; Baron Grosvenor
2nd	Richard Grosvenor (1795–1869)	1845–1869	Elizabeth Leveson-Gower	Son of the preceding	Earl Grosvenor; Viscount Belgrave; Baron Grosvenor
3rd	Hugh Grosvenor (1825–1899)	1869–1899	Constance Sutherland-Leveson-Gower	Son of the preceding, later created Duke of Westminster	Earl Grosvenor; Viscount Belgrave; Baron Grosvenor

Jockey Colours of Duke of Westminster

== Dukes of Westminster (1874) ==
Created by Queen Victoria
#	Name (lifespan)	Period	Spouse	Notes	Other titles
1st	Hugh Grosvenor (1825–1899)	1874–1899	Constance Sutherland-Leveson-Gower; Katherine Cavendish	Already Marquess of Westminster	Marquess of Westminster; Earl Grosvenor; Viscount Belgrave; Baron Grosvenor
2nd	Hugh Grosvenor (1879–1953)	1899–1953	Constance Cornwallis-West; Violet Nelson; Loelia Ponsonby; Anne Sullivan	Grandson of the preceding	Marquess of Westminster; Earl Grosvenor; Viscount Belgrave; Baron Grosvenor
3rd	William Grosvenor (1894–1963)	1953–1963	unmarried	Son of the second son of the first duke	Marquess of Westminster; Earl Grosvenor; Viscount Belgrave; Baron Grosvenor
4th	Gerald Grosvenor (1907–1967)	1963–1967	Sally Perry	Son of the third son of the first duke	Marquess of Westminster; Earl Grosvenor; Viscount Belgrave; Baron Grosvenor
5th	Robert Grosvenor (1910–1979)	1967–1979	Viola Lyttelton	Brother of the preceding	Marquess of Westminster; Earl Grosvenor; Viscount Belgrave; Baron Grosvenor
6th	Gerald Grosvenor (1951–2016)	1979–2016	Natalia Phillips	Son of the preceding	Marquess of Westminster; Earl Grosvenor; Viscount Belgrave; Baron Grosvenor
7th	Hugh Grosvenor (b. 1991)	since 2016	Olivia Henson	Son of the preceding	Marquess of Westminster; Earl Grosvenor; Viscount Belgrave; Baron Grosvenor

== Line of succession ==
As of 2026, there is no heir to the Dukedom of Westminster, as the current Duke has no sons; his only child is a daughter, Lady Cosima Florence Grosvenor, who was born on 27 July 2025.

The Earl of Wilton is heir presumptive to the Marquessate, and would succeed as the 10th Marquess.

Line of succession (Marquess of Westminster)
- Thomas Egerton, 1st Earl of Wilton (1749–1814)
  - Lady Eleanor Egerton (1770–1846) m. Robert Grosvenor, 1st Marquess of Westminster (1767–1845)
    - Richard Grosvenor, 2nd Marquess of Westminster (1795–1869)
      - Hugh Grosvenor, 1st Duke of Westminster (1825–1899)
        - Victor Alexander Grosvenor, Earl Grosvenor (1853–1884)
          - Hugh Grosvenor, 2nd Duke of Westminster (1879–1953)
        - Lord Henry George Grosvenor (1861–1914)
          - William Grosvenor, 3rd Duke of Westminster (1894–1963)
        - Lord Hugh William Grosvenor (1884–1914)
          - Gerald Grosvenor, 4th Duke of Westminster (1907–1967)
          - Robert Grosvenor, 5th Duke of Westminster (1910–1979)
            - Gerald Grosvenor, 6th Duke of Westminster (1951–2016)
              - Hugh Grosvenor, 7th Duke of Westminster (born 1991)
    - Robert Grosvenor, 1st Baron Ebury (1801–1883)
      - Robert Grosvenor, 2nd Baron Ebury (1834–1918)
        - Francis Egerton Grosvenor, 4th Baron Ebury (1883–1932)
          - Robert Grosvenor, 5th Baron Ebury (1914–1957)
            - Francis Grosvenor, 8th Earl of Wilton, 6th Baron Ebury (1934-2026)
              - (1) Julian Francis Martin Grosvenor, 9th Earl of Wilton, 7th Baron Ebury (born 1959)
            - The Hon. William Wellesley Grosvenor (1942–2002)
              - (2) Alexander Egerton Grosvenor (born 1968)
            - (3) The Hon. Richard Alexander Grosvenor (born 1946)
              - (4) Bendor Robert Gerard Grosvenor (born 1977)
          - The Hon. Hugh Richard Grosvenor (1919–2002)
            - (5) William Peter Wellesley Grosvenor (born 1959)

== See also ==
- Earl of Wilton
- Baron Ebury
- Baron Stalbridge
- Duchess of Westminster
