= Sir Richard Grosvenor, 4th Baronet =

British politician (1689–1732)

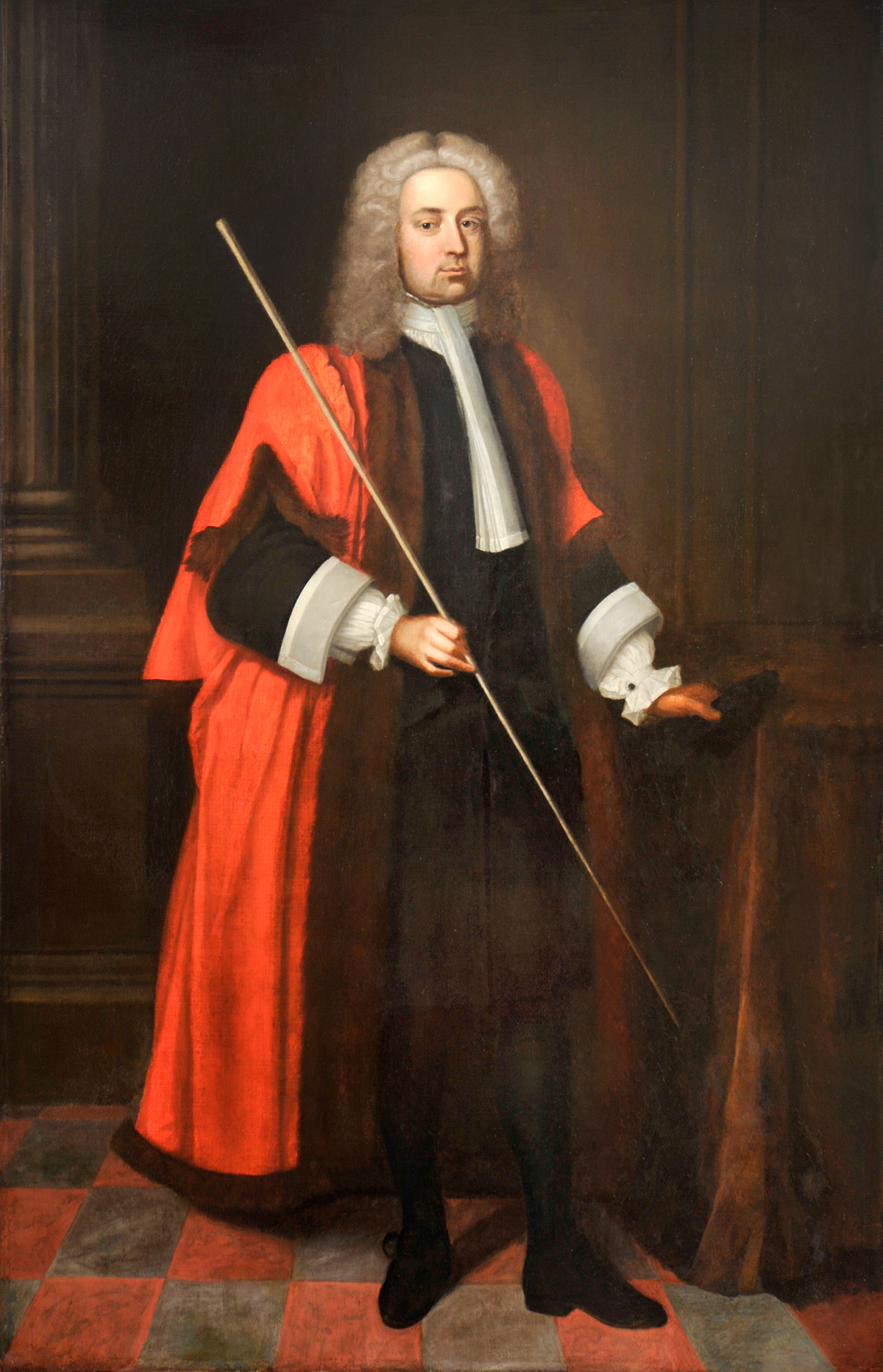
1715 portrait of Grosvenor by Charles Jervas

Sir Richard Grosvenor, 4th Baronet (/ˈɡroʊvənər/ GROH-vən-ər; 26 June 1689 – 12 July 1732) was a British politician who represented the City of Chester in the House of Commons of Great Britain from 1715 to 1732. He was the brother of Sir Robert Grosvenor, 6th Baronet, an ancestor of the modern day Dukes of Westminster.

== Early life ==
Richard Grosvenor was the eldest surviving son of Sir Thomas Grosvenor, 3rd Baronet. His two older brothers, Thomas and Roger, pre-deceased their father. At the time of his father's death in 1700, he was still being educated at Eton College, and was under the guardianship of Sir Richard Myddelton, 3rd Baronet, and Thomas and Francis Cholmondeley. After leaving Eton, he went on the Grand Tour, visiting Switzerland, Bavaria, Italy and the Netherlands. In 1707, he returned to the family home at Eaton Hall, Cheshire.

== Political career ==
At the 1715 general election, Grosvenor was returned as Member of Parliament for the City of Chester. Also in 1715, he was mayor of the city. In September 1715 he attended a meeting of the Jacobite Cheshire Club, when it decided not to take part in the rebellion. He was elected MP for Chester again in 1722. In 1727 he participated in the coronation of George II. At the 1727 general election, Grosvenor and his brother Thomas, won both of the parliamentary seats for Chester. During the time that Grosvenor was baronet, the estates in London were being developed. Also during this time there is evidence of the first association of the Grosvenor family with horse racing, when Grosvenor's horses ran at Chester and Newmarket in 1720.

== Family ==
In 1708, Grosvenor married Jane, the daughter of Sir Edward Wyndham of Orchard Wyndham, Somerset. The couple had one daughter, Catherine, who died in 1718. During the following year, Jane Grosvenor died and Grosvenor then married Diana, the only daughter of Sir George Warburton, 3rd Baronet Arley. They had no children.

Grosvenor died in July 1732 and was buried at Eccleston, Cheshire. He was succeeded by his younger brother, Thomas, who in turn died in February 1733.

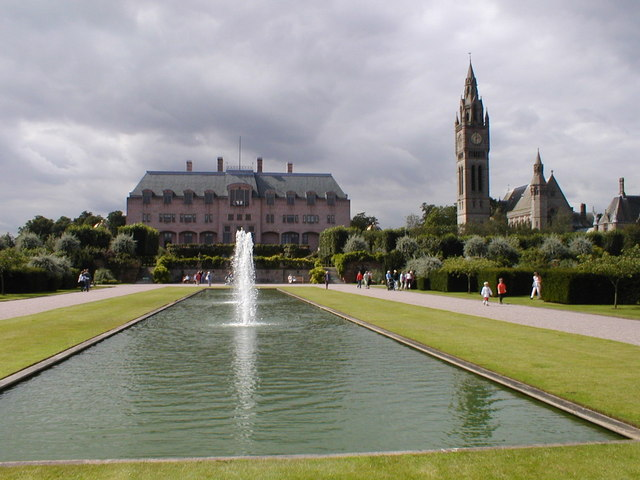
Eaton Hall, seat of the Grosvenor family

Coat of arms of the Grosvenor Baronets, of Eaton (1622)

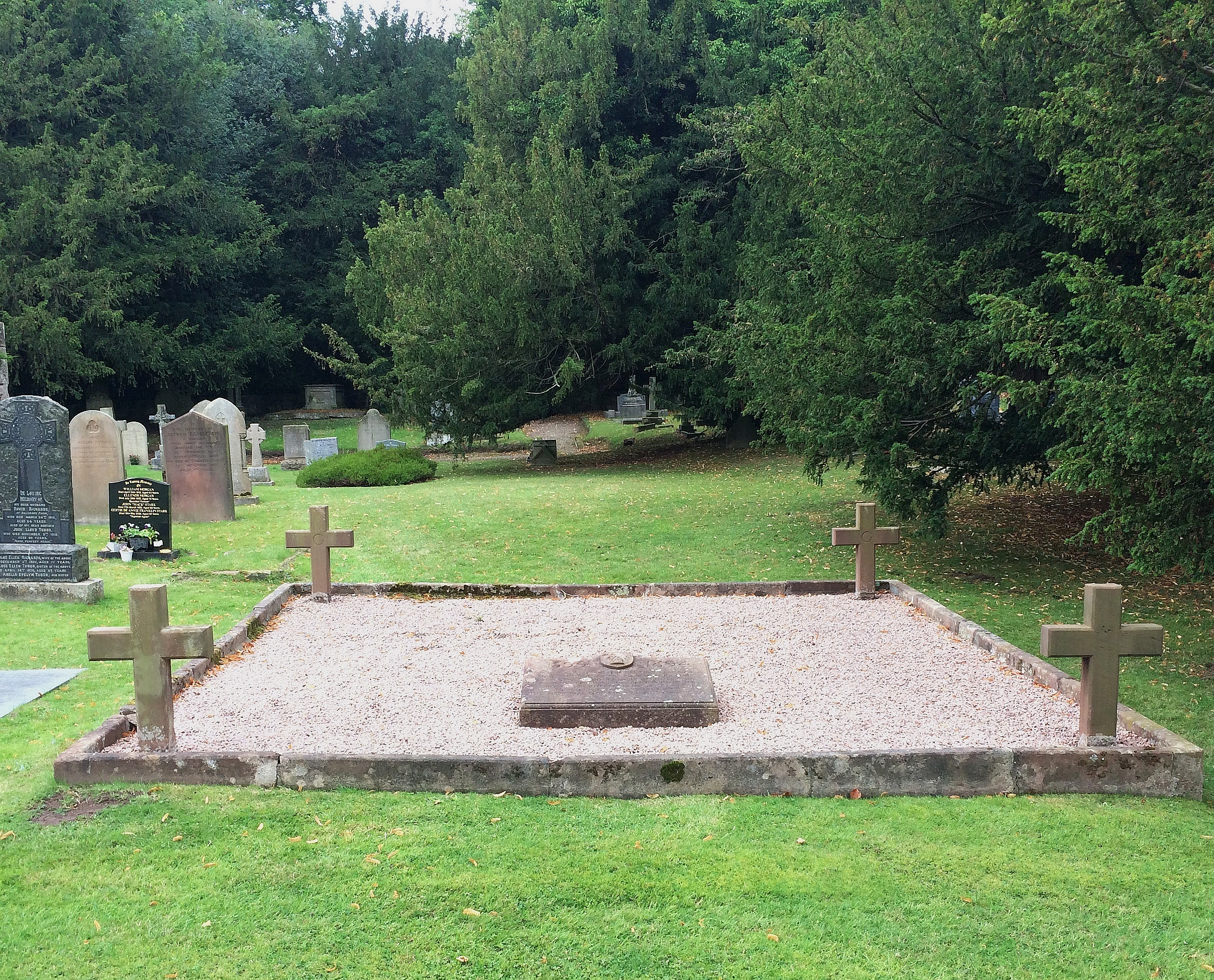
St Mary's Church, Eccleston - The enclosure which marks the site of the Grosvenor family vault within the demolished old church

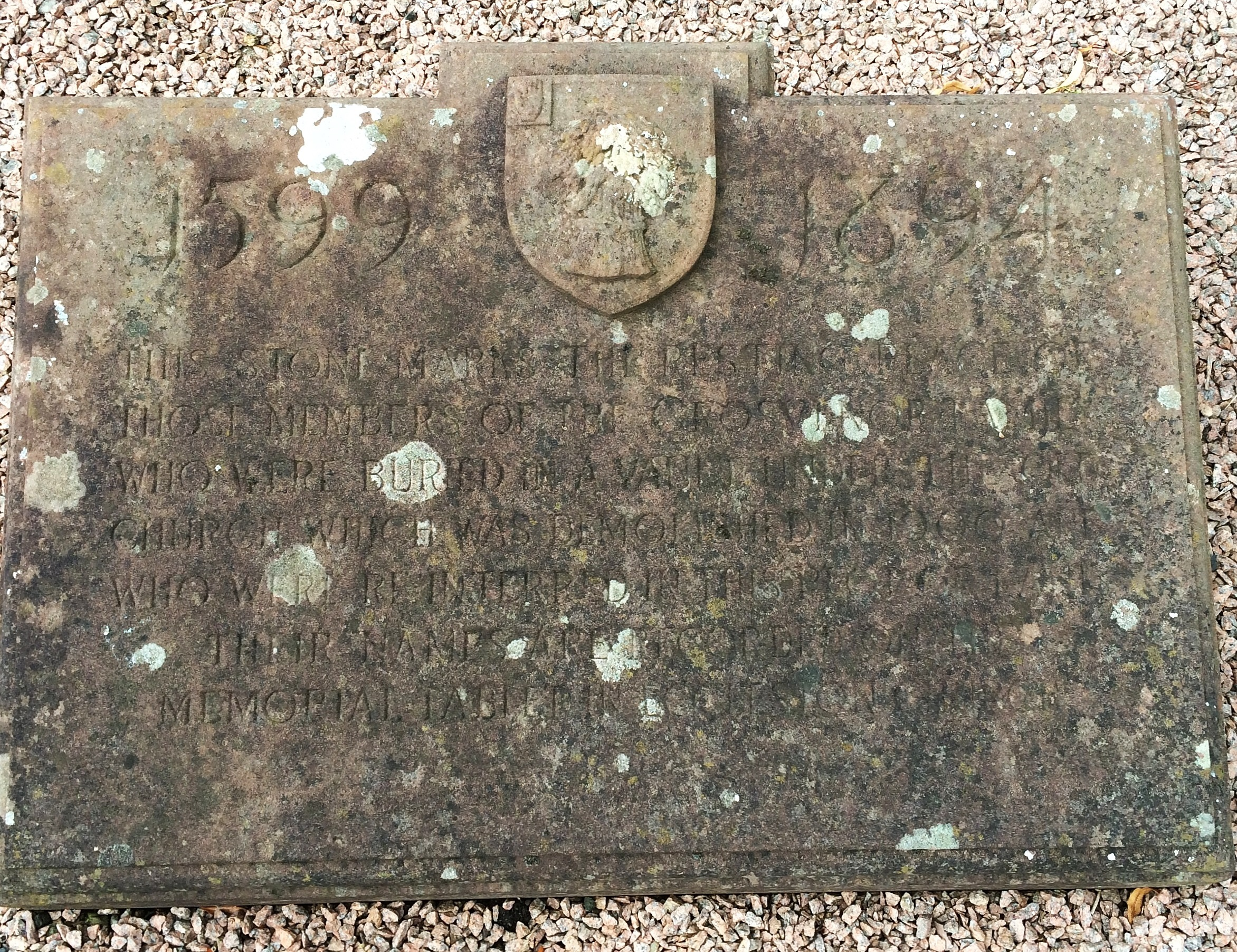
St Mary's Church, Eccleston - The tablet in the enclosure marking the site of the Grosvenor family vault within the old church

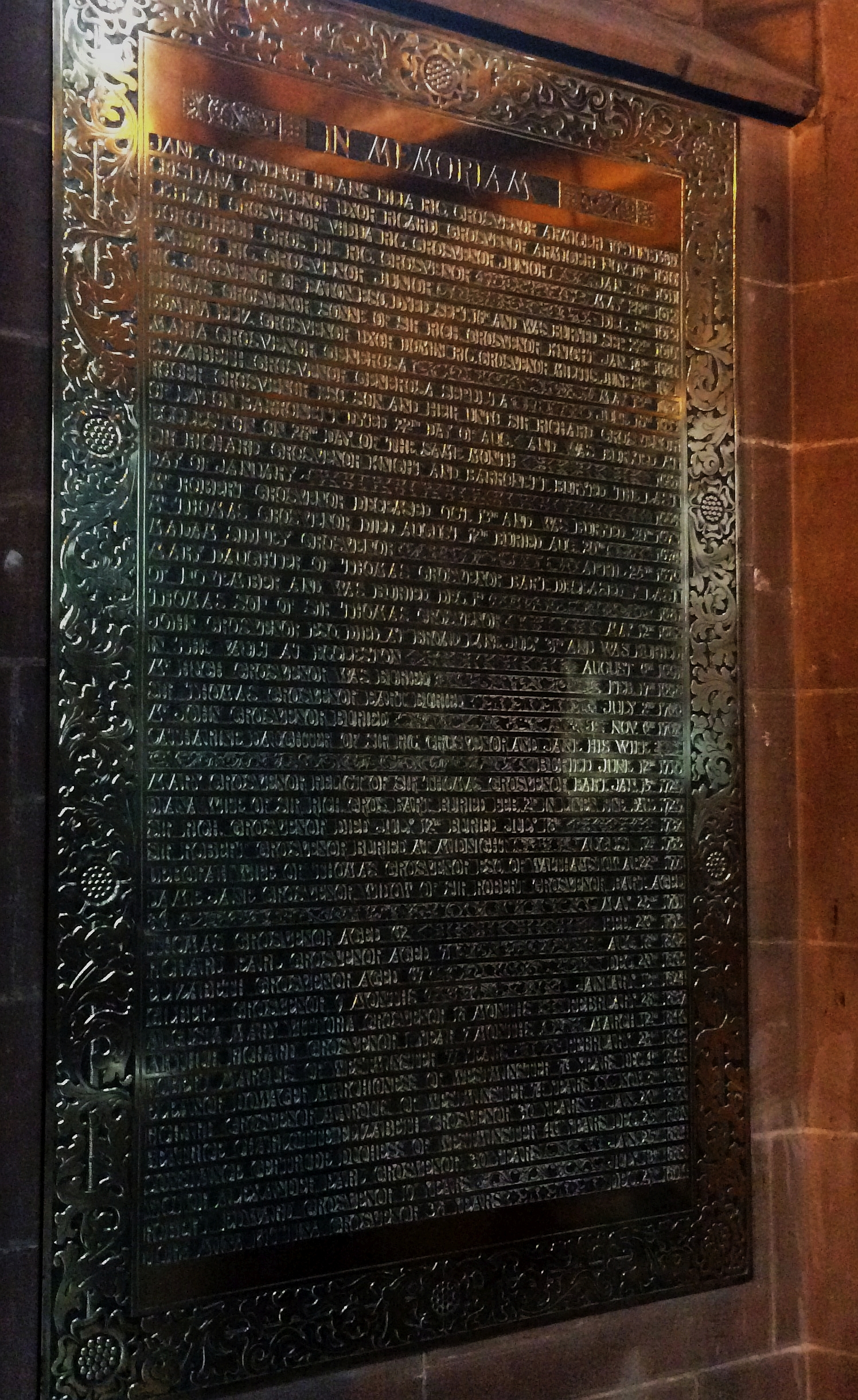
St Mary's Church, Eccleston - The tablet in the new church which lists the Grosvenors buried in the demolished old church

Parliament of Great Britain
Preceded by Peter Shakerley; Sir Henry Bunbury	Member of Parliament for the City of Chester; 1715–1732; With: Sir Henry Bunbury 1715–1727; Thomas Grosvenor 1727–1732	Succeeded by Sir Thomas Grosvenor; Robert Grosvenor
Baronetage of England
Preceded by Thomas Grosvenor	Baronet (of Eaton); 1700–1732	Succeeded by Thomas Grosvenor
