= Sir Charles Bunbury, 4th Baronet =

British politician

Sir Charles Bunbury, 4th Baronet (c. 1708 – 10 April 1742), of Bunbury, Cheshire and Rake Hall, Stanney, near Chester, was a British politician who sat in the House of Commons from 1733 to 1742.

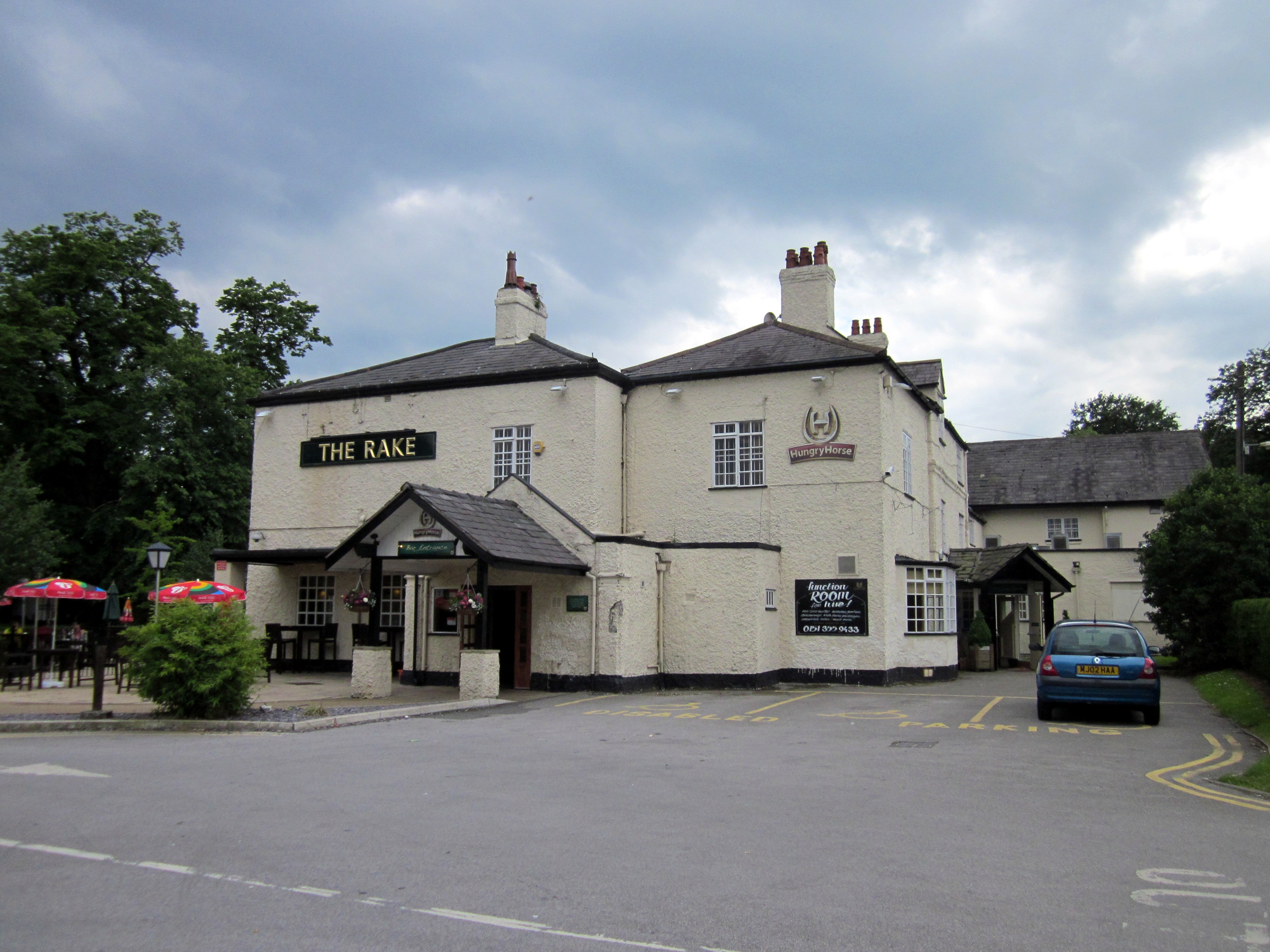
The Rake - formerly Rake Hall, Stanney

Bunbury was baptized at Chester Cathedral on 9 February 1708, the eldest surviving son of Sir Henry Bunbury, 3rd Baronet, and his wife Susannah Hanmer, daughter of William Hanmer. He succeeded his father to the baronetcy on 2 February 1733.

Bunbury was elected as Tory Member of Parliament for Chester at a by-election on 21 March 1733, and again at the 1734 British general election. He voted against the Government on the Excise Bill and the repeal of the Septennial Act. His health was poor and he went to the south of France for recovery in January 1738, and was absent from the vote on the Spanish convention on 8 March 1739. He then voted with the Opposition on all recorded occasions. He was returned unopposed at the 1741 British general election.

Bunbury died unmarried after a long illness on 10 April 1742, aged 34. He was succeeded in the baronetcy by his younger brother, William. His nephews were Sir Charles Bunbury and Henry Bunbury.

Parliament of Great Britain
Preceded by Sir Thomas Grosvenor; Sir Robert Grosvenor	Member of Parliament for Chester; 1733–1742; With: Sir Robert Grosvenor	Succeeded by Sir Robert Grosvenor; Philip Henry Warburton
Baronetage of England
Preceded by Henry Bunbury	Baronet (of Stanney Hall); 1733–1742	Succeeded by William Bunbury
