= Sir Richard Grosvenor, 2nd Baronet =

English baronet

Arms of the Grosvenor Baronets: Azure, a garb or with a canton of a baronet, being the Red Hand of Ulster

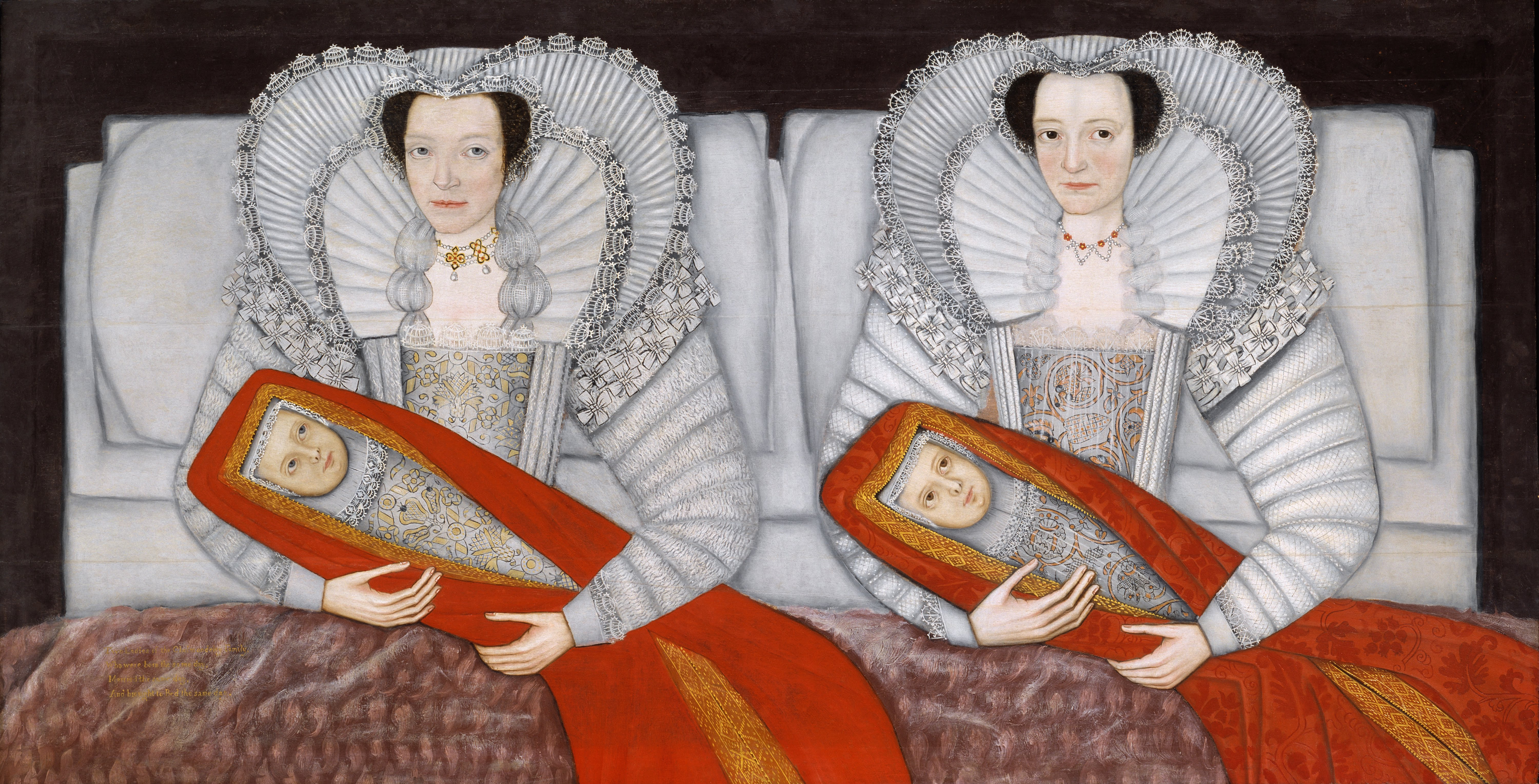
Lettice, Lady Grosvenor, and her sister, Mary, Lady Calveley, ca. 1604

Sir Richard Grosvenor, 2nd Baronet (c. 1604 – 31 January 1665) is an ancestor of the modern day Dukes of Westminster. He was the son of Sir Richard Grosvenor, 1st Baronet and Lettice Cholmondeley, daughter of Sir Hugh Cholmondeley. He spent his childhood at Eaton Hall, Cheshire.

In 1628 he married Sydney, daughter of Sir Roger Mostyn of Mostyn, Flintshire, thereby also gaining estates in north Wales.

Sir Richard was involved in the Civil War on the Royalist side. In 1643 he was High Sheriff of Cheshire and in February of that year outlawed those who supported the Parliamentary cause in the Battle of Edgehill in the previous October.

In July 1659, Sir Richard was a supporter of Sir George Booth in the abortive pro-Royalist Cheshire and Lancashire Rising. Sir Richard's son and heir, Roger, was killed in a duel by his cousin, Hugh Roberts, on 22 August 1661.

Sir Richard's daughter, Sidney, married Nicholas Bagenal.

When Sir Richard died in 1665, he was succeeded by his grandson Sir Thomas Grosvenor, 3rd Baronet, who was aged only eight at the time.

== Dedication by Wenceslaus Hollar ==
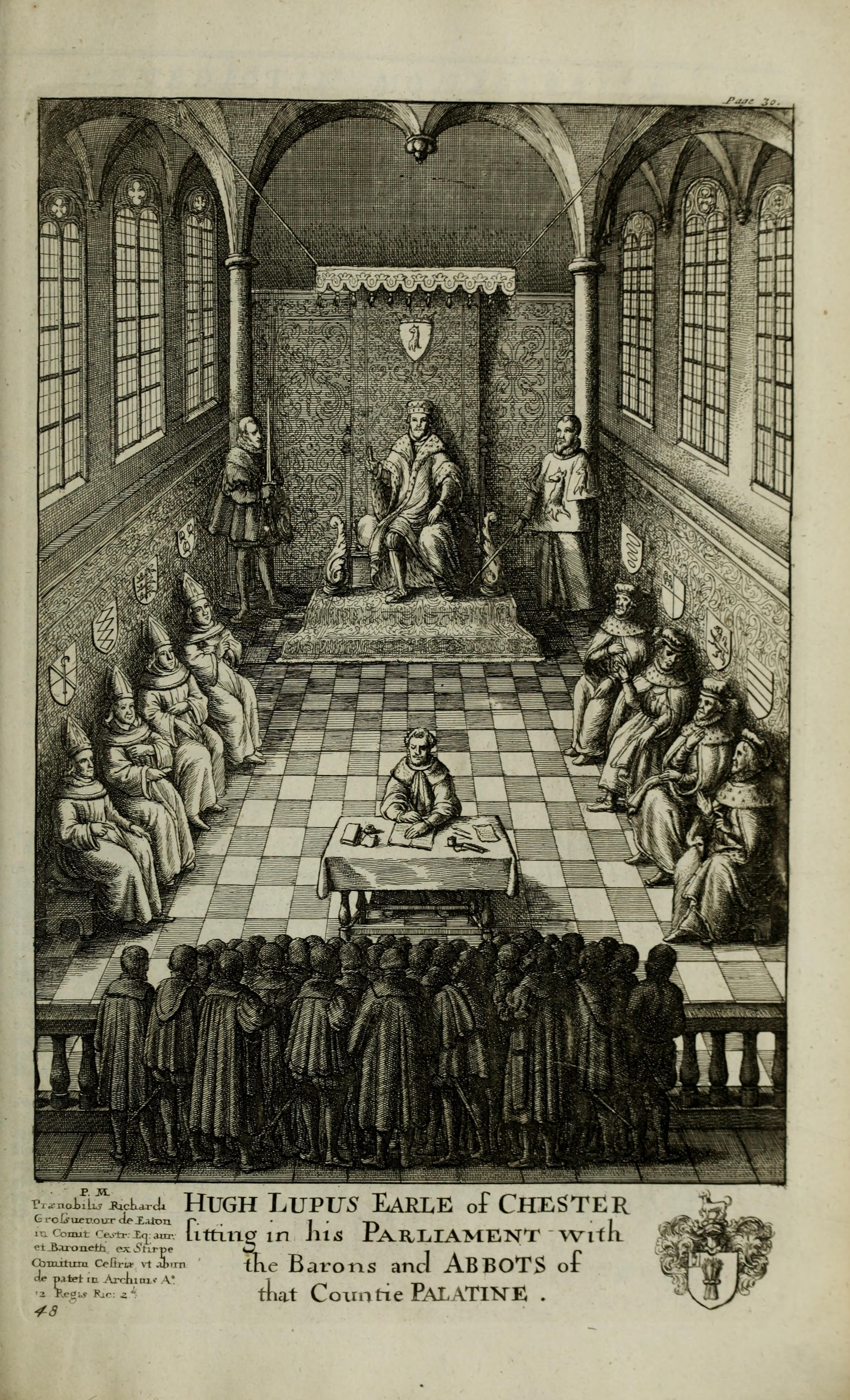
"Hugh Lupus Earle of Chester sitting in his parliament with the barons and abbots of that Countie Palatine". 1656 engraving by Wenceslaus Hollar, dedicated to Sir Richard Grosvenor, 2nd Baronet

An Imaginary view of "Hugh Lupus Earle of Chester sitting in his parliament with the barons and abbots of that Countie Palatine" was engraved in 1656 by Wenceslaus Hollar, and published as an illustration to King's 'The Vale-Royall of England' and 'A Short Treatise of the Isle of Man' (London: 1656); second state. The engraving is dedicated in Latin: PM praenobilis Richardi Grossvenour de Eaton in Comitatu Cestriae Equitis Auratis et Baronetti ex stirpe comitatum Cestriae ut abunde patet in archivi A* Regis Ric(ardi) 2 ("(In honour of (?)) the most noble Richard Grosvenor of Eaton in the County of Chester, Knight Bachelor and Baronet, from the stock of the Earls of Chester as is abundantly apparent in the archives "A*" of King Richard II"). The arms of Grosvenor are shown at right bottom, featuring the Garb of Chester and a canton of a baronet.

Baronetage of England
Preceded by Richard Grosvenor	Baronet (of Eaton); 1645–1665	Succeeded by Thomas Grosvenor
