= Peter Shakerley =

English politician (c. 1650 – 1726)

Peter Shakerley (c. 1650 – 24 June 1726) was an English Tory politician. He sat as MP for Wigan from 1690 until 1698 and MP for Chester from 1698 until 1715.

== Family and education ==
He was the first son of Sir Geoffrey Shakerley and his first wife Katherine (née Pennington). Shakeley's father fought for the Royalists at the Battle of Rowton Moor, after which the family estates were sequestrated.

He was educated at Brasenose, Oxford and matriculated on 28 March 1667 at the age of 17. He was educated at the Inner Temple in 1667. On 12 February 1678, he married Elizabeth, the daughter of Sir Thomas Mainwaring, 1st Baronet. His wife died in 1691.

== Political career ==
In 1681, his first recorded political activity occurred when he signed a "loyal address" during the Cheshire parliamentary election. In 1682, he succeeded his father as governor of Chester Castle. In 1685, after the Monmouth Rebellion, he gathered evidence used in the trial of Henry Booth, 1st Earl of Warrington. In 1688, during the Glorious Revolution, he initially supported James II of England but tried to reconcile with William III of England. He was arrested on 14 May 1689 with proclamations from James II and imprisoned in the Tower of London but was released on bail in November.

=== Parliamentary career ===
In 1690, he was elected as a Tory for Wigan. He was active in parliament, serving on committees, acting as teller in votes, defended the Church of England and promoted legislation including bills about royal mines, trade and taxation. In 1693–1694, he supported the Triennial Bill and criticized government spending and taxation. In 1694, he got involved in controversy when he argued that those accused of the Lancashire Plot were treated unjustly. In 1698, he returned to Parliament as MP for Chester and promoted local economic interests (especially Cheshire salt production, navigation of the River Dee, and trade issues).

Upon Queen Anne's ascension to the throne, Shakerley was reappointed governor of Chester Castle. He continued serving as a Tory MP until he was defeated in the 1715 general election by Sir Richard Grosvenor, 4th Baronet and withdrew from politics.

Shakerley died on 24 June 1726 and was buried at Lower Peover, Cheshire.
