= Churton, Cheshire =

Village in Cheshire, England

Coordinates: 53°6′7.52″N 2°52′14.77″W

Churton
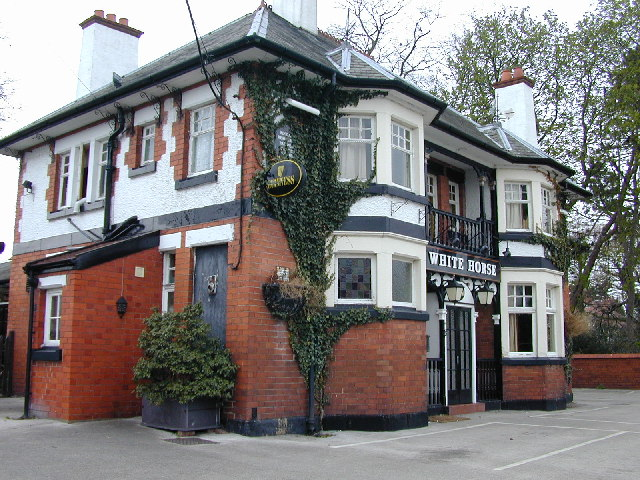
- The White Horse pub in Churton in 2004

- Location within Cheshire
- Civil parish: Churton
- District: Cheshire West and Chester
- Ceremonial county: Cheshire
- Region: North West
- Country: England
- Sovereign state: United Kingdom
- Post town: Chester
- Postcode district: CH3
- UK Parliament: Chester South and Eddisbury
- Website: Churton Parish Council

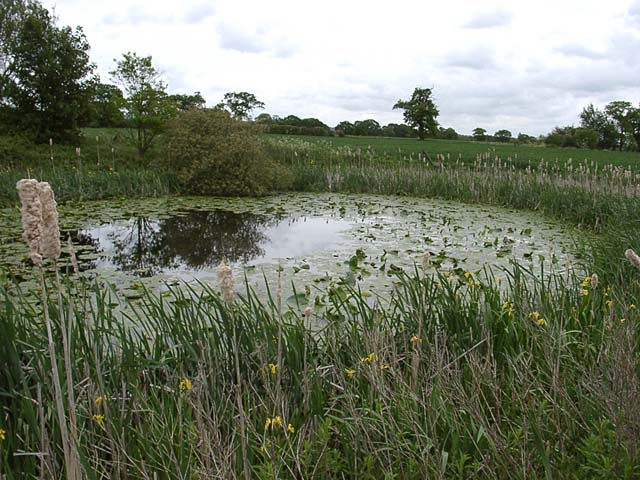
A marlpit in Churton

Churton is a village and civil parish in the Cheshire West and Chester district of Cheshire, England, formed from the parishes of Churton by Aldford, Churton by Farndon and Edgerley in 2015.
