= Henry Booth, 1st Earl of Warrington =

English politician (1652–1694)

The Right Honourable The Earl of Warrington
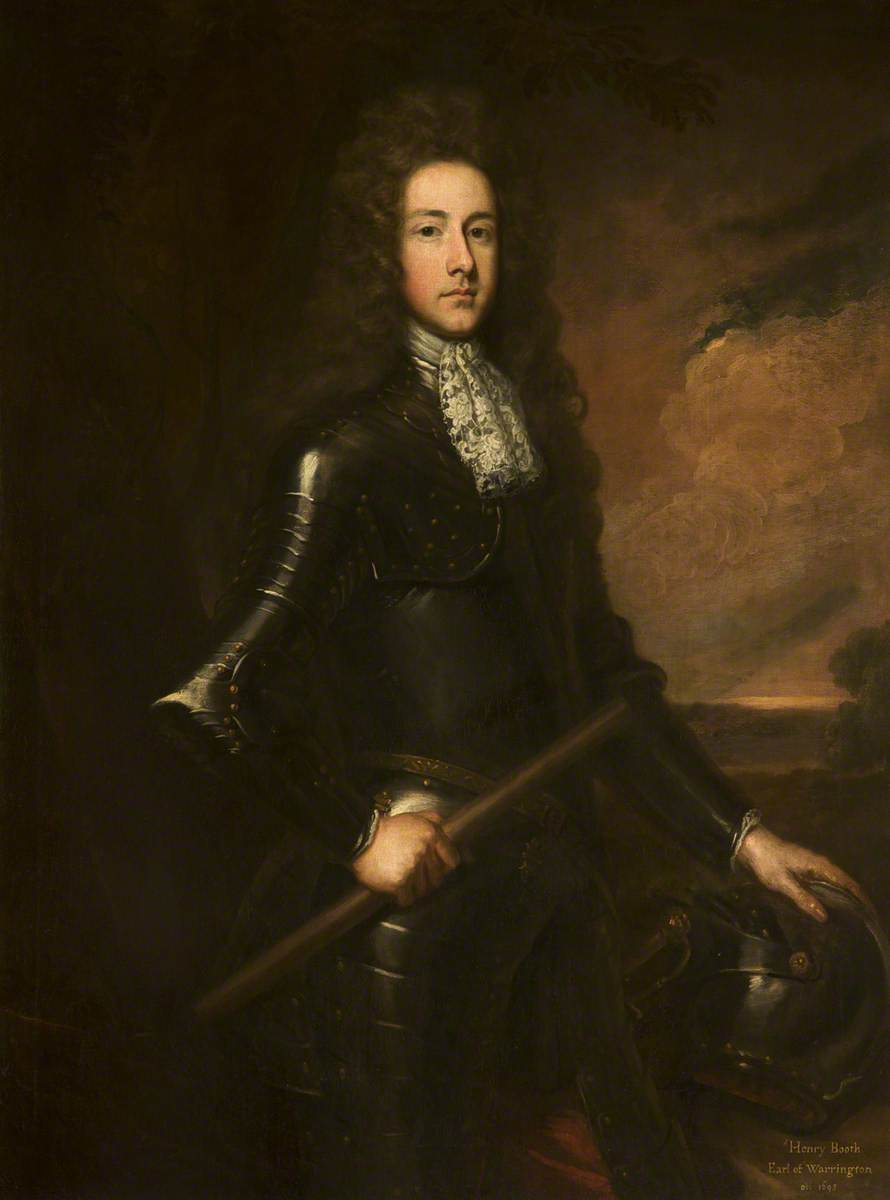
- Portrait by Sir Godfrey Kneller, 1693

Chancellor of the Exchequer
- In office 1689–1690
- Preceded by: Sir John Ernle
- Succeeded by: Richard Hampden

Member of the English Parliament for Cheshire
- In office 1678–1685 Serving with Thomas Cholmondeley, Sir Philip Egerton & Sir Robert Cotton
- Preceded by: Sir Fulk Lucy; Thomas Cholmondeley
- Succeeded by: Sir Philip Egerton; Thomas Cholmondeley

Personal details
- Born: 13 January 1652
- Died: 2 January 1694 (aged 41)
- Spouse: Mary Langham
- Children: George Booth, 2nd Earl of Warrington
- Parents: George Booth, 1st Baron Delamer (father); Lady Elizabeth Grey (mother)

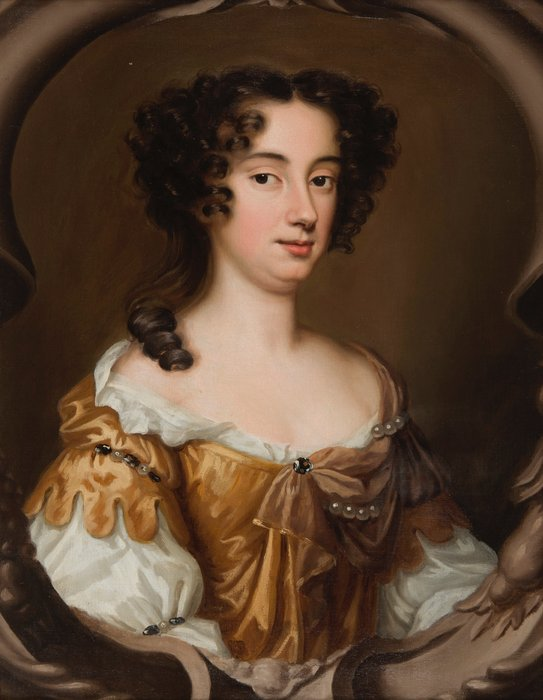
Mary Langham, Lady Delamer, portrait by Mary Beale

Henry Booth, 1st Earl of Warrington, PC (13 January 1652 – 2 January 1694) was an English politician who served as Chancellor of the Exchequer from 1689 to 1690.

== Life ==
Booth was a son of George Booth, Baron Delamer and Lady Elizabeth Grey. His maternal grandparents were Henry Grey, 1st Earl of Stamford and Anne Cecil, daughter of William Cecil, 2nd Earl of Exeter.

Booth served as a Member of Parliament for Cheshire in 1678, 1679 and 1679–1681, and was conspicuous for his opposition to Catholics. On 7 July 1670, he married Mary Langham, daughter of Sir James Langham, 2nd Baronet.

At a treason trial in the House of Lords in January 1685/6, Delamer was accused of participation in the Monmouth Rebellion, and the presiding judge in the case was Judge Jeffreys, as Lord High Steward, sitting with thirty other peers. The defence secured an acquittal.

During the Revolution of 1688, Booth declared in favour of William of Orange, and raised an army in Cheshire in support of him. After William was installed as William III, he made Booth chancellor of the exchequer in 1689. He wrote a number of political tracts, which were published after his death as The Works of the Right Honourable Henry, Late L. Delamer, and Earl of Warrington. He also authored a tract in vindication of his friend, Lord Russel. He was created Earl of Warrington on 17 April 1690. He became mayor of Chester in October 1691, and died on 2 January 1694.

== Wife and children ==
By his marriage in 1670 to Mary Langham, a daughter of Sir James Langham, 2nd Baronet, Warrington had five children who survived infancy:

- Elizabeth (died 1697)
- Mary (1674–1741), who married Russell Robartes and was the mother of Henry Robartes, 3rd Earl of Radnor
- George Booth, 2nd Earl of Warrington (1675–1758)
- Langham Booth (1684–1724), a Whig member of parliament
- Henry Booth (1687–1726)

== Monumental inscriptions ==
In the Dunham Chancel of the Church of Bowdon is a monument placed between two windows on the south side of the chapel, and divided into two tablets; the first of which is inscribed:

"Beneath lieth the body of the right hon'ble Henry Booth, earl of Warrington, and baron Delamer of Dunham Massey, a person of unblemished honour, impartial justice, strict integrity, an illustrious example of steady and unalterable adherence to the liberties and properties of his country in the worst of times, rejecting all offers to allure, and despising all dangers to deter him therefrom, for which he was thrice committed close prisoner to the Tower of London, and at length tried for his life upon a false accusation of high treason, from which he was unanimously acquitted by his peers, on 14 January, MDCLXXX V/VI which day he afterwards annually commemorated by acts of devotion and charity: in the year MDCLXXXVIII he greatly signalised himself at the Revolution, on behalf of the protestant religion and the rights of the nation, without mixture of self-interest, preferring the good of his country to the favour of the prince who then ascended the throne; and having served his generation according to the will of God was gathered to his fathers in peace, on the 2d of January, 169¾, in the XLIId year of his age, whose mortal part was here entombed on the same memorable day on which eight years before his trial had been."

On the other tablet is inscribed:

"Also rest by him the earthly remains of the r. hon'ble Mary countess of Warrington, his wife, sole daughter and heir of sir James Langham, of Cottesbrooke, in the county of Northamptom, [sic] knt. and bart. a lady of ingenious parts, singular discretion, consummate judgement, great humility, meek and compassionate temper, extensive charity, exemplary and unaffected piety, perfect resignation to God's will, lowly in prosperity and patient in adversity, prudent in her affairs, and endowed with all other virtuous qualities, a conscientious discharger of her duty in all relations, being a faithful, affectionate, and observant, wife, alleviating the cares and afflictions of her husband by willingly sharing with him therein; a tender, indulgent, and careful mother, a dutiful and respectful daughter, gentle and kind to her servants, courteous and beneficent to her neighbours, a sincere friend, a lover and valuer of all good people, justly beloved and admired by all who knew her, who having perfected holiness in the fear of God, was by him received to an early and eternal rest from her labours, on 23 March 1690/1, in the XXXVIIth year of her age, calmly and composedly meeting and desiring death with joyful hope and steadfastness of faith, a lively draught of real worth and goodness, and a pattern deserving imitation, of whom the world was not worthy. Heb. XI. 38."

== See also ==
- Earl of Warrington

Parliament of England
Preceded by Sir Fulk Lucy; Thomas Cholmondeley	Member of Parliament for Cheshire; 1678–1685; With: Thomas Cholmondeley 1678–1679; Sir Philip Egerton 1679; Sir Robert Cotton, Bt 1679–1685	Succeeded by Sir Philip Egerton; Thomas Cholmondeley
Political offices
Preceded by Sir John Ernle	Chancellor of the Exchequer; 1689–1690	Succeeded by Richard Hampden
Honorary titles
Preceded by The Lord Delamer	Custos Rotulorum of Cheshire; 1673–1682	Succeeded by The Earl of Derby
Preceded by The Earl of Derby	Lord Lieutenant of Cheshire; 1689–1694	Vacant Title next held by The Earl Rivers
Preceded by The Marquess of Powis	Custos Rotulorum of Cheshire; 1689–1694	Vacant Title next held by The Earl Rivers
Peerage of England
New creation	Earl of Warrington; 1st creation 1690–1694	Succeeded by George Booth
Preceded by George Booth	Baron Delamer; 1st creation 1684–1694	Succeeded by George Booth
