= Charles Cholmondeley (politician) =

British landowner and Tory politician

Charles Cholmondeley (/ˈtʃʌmli/, 12 January 1685 – 1756) of Vale Royal, Cheshire, was a British landowner and Tory politician who sat in the House of Commons between 1710 and 1756.

== Early life ==
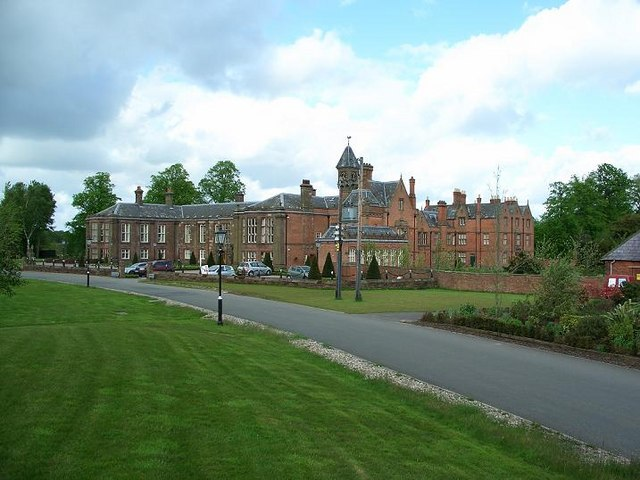
Vale Royal Abbey

Cholmondeley was the eldest surviving son of Thomas Cholmondeley of Vale Royal and his second wife, Anne St John, daughter of Sir Walter St John, 3rd Baronet of Battersea and Lydiard Tregoze, Wilts. In 1702 he succeeded his father to the estates at Vale Royal. He was admitted at St. John’s College, Cambridge on 13 October. 1701 and at Middle Temple in August 1709. He married Essex Pitt, daughter of Thomas Pitt (governor) of Stratford Wiltshire on 22 July 1714.

== Career ==
At the 1710 general election Cholmondeley was elected Tory Member of Parliament for Cheshire in a contest. He was a member of the October Club and listed as a ‘worthy patriot’. He increasingly involved himself in the attempts of Tory back-benchers to influence policy. By 1712, he changed his allegiance from the October Club to the March Club. He was returned unopposed in 1713. Some of his Tory supporters in Cheshire abandoned him at the 1715 general election and he was defeated at the poll.

When the Duke of Ormonde fled abroad in July 1715, Cholmondeley drank the Jacobite toast with Sir Henry Bunbury and Lord Barrymore. He was returned as MP for Cheshire again in a contest at the 1722 general election. In Parliament, he voted consistently with the opposition. He was elected in a contest again at the 1727 general election. He spoke against the government on the repeal of the Septennial Act on 13 March 1734. At the 1734 general election he was re-elected in a contest again. From then on, he was returned as MP for Cheshire unopposed in 1741, 1747 and 1754 and continued to vote regularly against the government.

== Death and legacy ==
Cholmondeley died on 30 March 1756. He had three sons and five daughters. Two of his sons predeceased him and he was succeeded in both his estates and his parliamentary seat by his son Thomas Cholmondeley.

Parliament of Great Britain
Preceded by Langham Booth; John Offley-Crewe	Member of Parliament for Cheshire; 1710–1715; With: Sir George Warburton, Bt	Succeeded by Sir George Warburton, Bt; Langham Booth
Preceded by Sir George Warburton, Bt; Langham Booth	Member of Parliament for Cheshire; 1722–1756; With: John Offley-Crewe 1722-1727; Sir Robert Salusbury Cotton, Bt 1727-1734; John Crewe 1734-1753; Charles Crewe 1753-1754; Samuel Egerton 1754-1756	Succeeded by Thomas Cholmondeley; Samuel Egerton
