= Davies Davenport =

Politician in Cheshire, England

The Right Honourable Davies Davenport
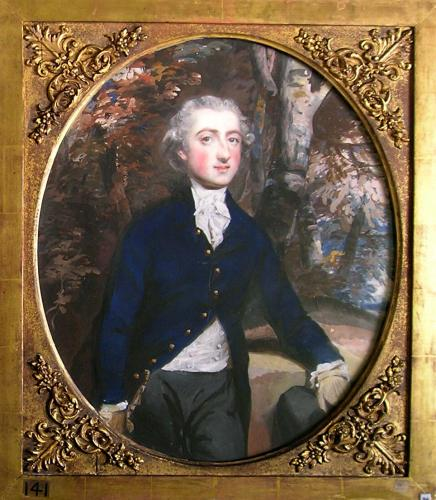
- portrait by Daniel Gardner

Member of Parliament for Cheshire
- In office 1806–1830 Serving with Thomas Cholmondeley (1806-1812); Wilbraham Egerton (1812-1830)
- Preceded by: William Egerton; Thomas Cholmondeley
- Succeeded by: The Viscount Belgrave; Wilbraham Egerton

Personal details
- Born: 29 August 1757
- Died: 5 February 1837 (aged 79)
- Spouse: Charlotte Sneyd
- Parents: Davies Davenport (father); Phoebe Davenport (mother)
- Education: Brasenose College, Oxford

Davies Davenport of Capesthorne Hall and Court Garden, Marlow (29 August 1757 — 5 February 1837) was a politician, soldier and landowner who served as Member of Parliament for Cheshire and High Sheriff of Cheshire.

== Early life ==
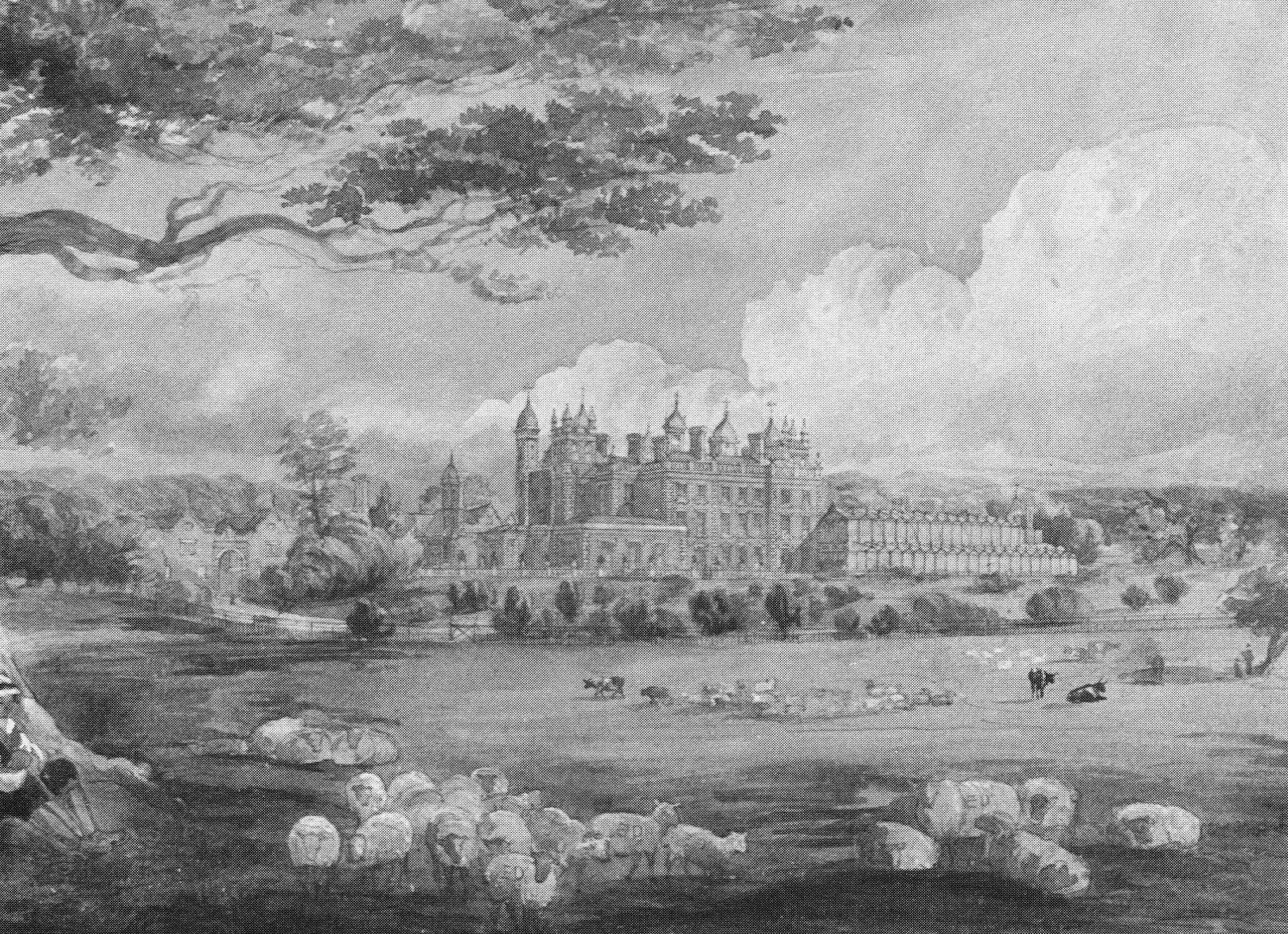
Capesthorne Hall

Davenport was born on 29 August 1757 to Davies Davenport of Capesthorpe and Phoebe Davenport of Calvely. However, both of his parents died when he was still young and so was brought up by his uncle, Sir Thomas Davenport. Lord Glenbervie described him as being educated as 'a pupil of J. J. Rousseau', he went on to Brasenose College, Oxford and was admitted into the Inner Temple in 1786. He inherited his uncle's estates in 1810.

== Political career ==
Davenport stood as an unopposed Member of Parliament for Cheshire from the 1806 United Kingdom general election until the 1830 United Kingdom general election when he stood down. Whilst Davenport was thought to be opposed to Abolitionism, he is not known to have voted against any of the abolitionist bills, he also voted against the bill proposing the ministerial pledge, however he was not supportive of Catholicism in general. Although he generally voted against the government, he was seen as a friend of the Liverpool ministry although opposed to that of Portland. He was however active in the committees on cotton and silk and was strictly against government interference.

== Family ==
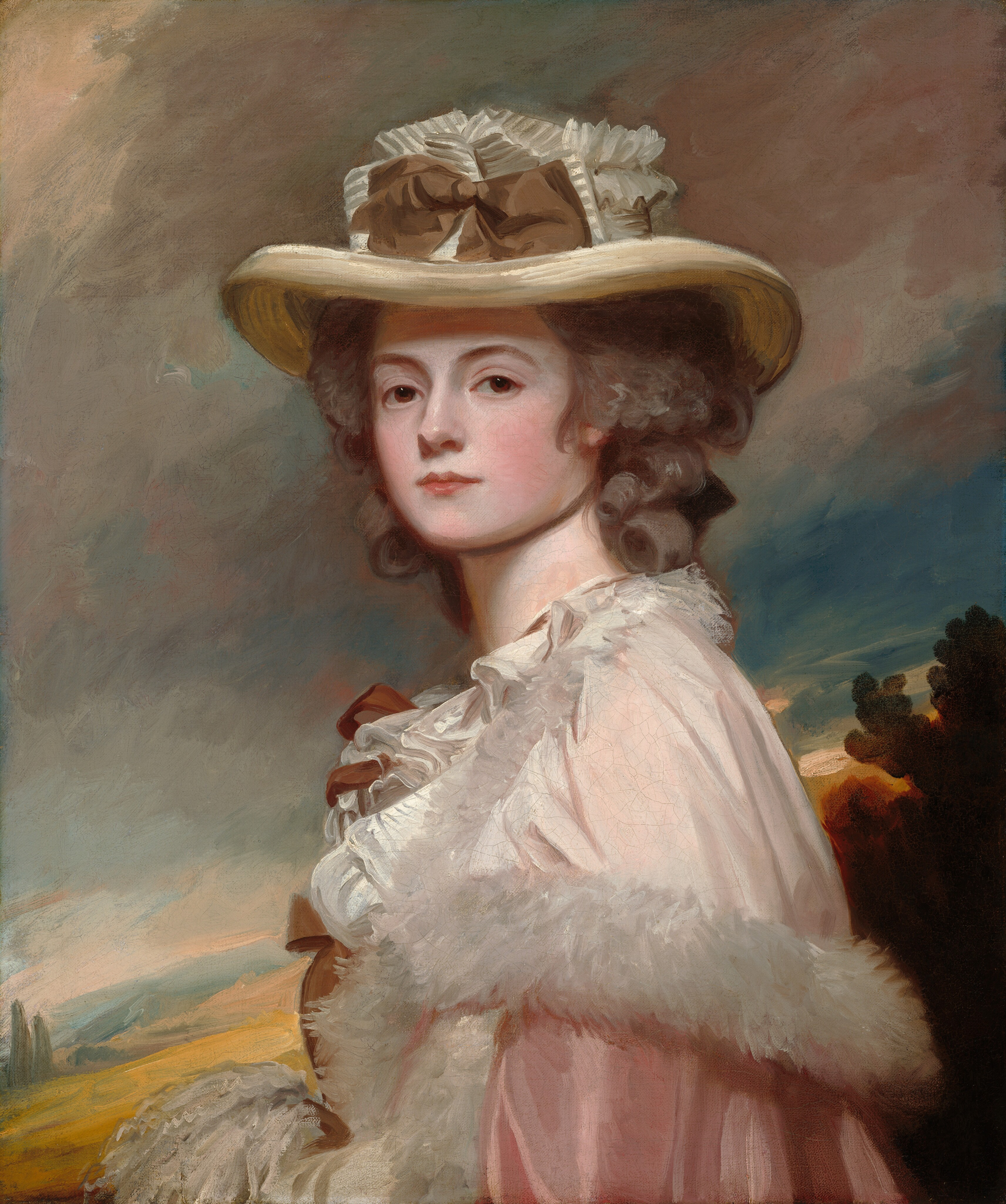
Davenport's wife, Charlotte Sneyd of Keele Hall by George Romney

In 1777 Davies married Charlotte, daughter of Ralph Sneyd of Keele Hall and Barbara Bagot, daughter of Sir Walter Bagot, 5th Baronet, they had several children:

- Major Henry William Davenport, Major of the 87th Regiment, died 1834.
- Edward Davies Davenport of Capesthorne Hall (1778-1847), Member of Parliament for Shaftesbury, inherited Capesthorne from his father. His son Arthur Henry Davenport then inherited Capesthorne but died without issue.
- Ann Frances Davenport (1783-1854), married William Grant Rose, had issue.
- Rev. Walter Davenport Bromley of Capesthorne Hall (1787-1862), Vicar of Ellastone, father of William Bromley-Davenport who inherited Capesthorne from his cousin, Arthur Henry Davenport, son of Edward Davies Davenport, had issue.
- Harriet Catherine Davenport (born 1791), married Sir John Williams, a Judge and Member of Parliament.

Davenport died on 5 February 1837 and was succeeded by his son, Edward, his eldest, Henry having predeceased him.

== Notes ==
- History of Parliament Biography

Parliament of the United Kingdom
Preceded by William Egerton; Thomas Cholmondeley	Member of Parliament for Cheshire; 1806 – 1830; With: Thomas Cholmondeley (1806-1812); Wilbraham Egerton (1812-1830)	Succeeded by The Viscount Belgrave; Wilbraham Egerton
Honorary titles
Preceded by Sir Peter Warburton Bt	High Sheriff of Cheshire; 1783	Succeeded by Thomas Willis
