= Ann Jebb =

English reformer and writer 1735–1812

- Born: Ann Torkington; 9 November 1735; Kings Ripton, Huntingdonshire,
- Died: 20 January 1812 (aged 76); Piccadilly, London
- Occupations: writer and reformer
- Spouse: John Jebb
- Writing career
- Pen name: Priscilla
- Language: English

Ann Jebb (née Torkington; 1735–1812) was an English political reformer and radical writer who published on both political and theological topics.

== Life and work ==
She was born at Ripton-Kings, Huntingdonshire, the eldest daughter of Dorothy Sherard (herself daughter of Philip Sherard, 2nd Earl of Harborough) and James Torkington, a Church of England vicar. She grew up in Huntingdonshire and was probably educated at home. She married religious and political reformer John Jebb in 1764 and fully shared his ideals. When they were first married he was lecturing at Cambridge, and she developed a reputation of her own in university circles where she held gatherings for reformers. Anne Plumptre was among her friends, and remained so until Jebb's death. Her writing often took the form of letters, signed with the nom de plume "Priscilla", such as the series she wrote to the London Chronicle (1772–4) during the movement of 1771 to abolish university and clerical subscription to the Thirty-nine Articles. Subsequently, in 1775, John Jebb resigned his church living, with the full support of Ann; John studied medicine and the couple later moved to London, where they were involved with a number of reformist causes such as the expansion of the franchise, opposition to the war with America, support for the French Revolution, abolitionism, and an end to legal discrimination against Roman Catholics. After she was widowed in 1786, she remained in London and continued to be politically active. Never robust, she died in 1812 after twenty years as an invalid and was buried with her husband.

== Writing and critical reception ==
Her writing appeared in the London Chronicle, the Whitehall Evening Post and the Monthly Repository, as well as in pamphlets and tracts. Often attacked for her politics, she has the distinction of having been mentioned by Richard Polwhele in The Unsex'd Females.

== Resources ==
- Blain, Virginia, et al., eds. "Jebb, Ann." The Feminist Companion to Literature in English. New Haven and London: Yale UP, 1990. 572.
- Brown, Susan, et al., eds. "Ann Jebb". Orlando: Women’s Writing in the British Isles from the Beginnings to the Present. Cambridge University Press. Accessed 11/14/23.
- Gascoigne, John. "Jebb, John (1736–1786)." Oxford Dictionary of National Biography. Ed. H. C. G. Matthew and Brian Harrison. Oxford: OUP, 2004. Online ed. Ed. Lawrence Goldman. Oct. 2005. 7 May 2007.
- Hole, Robert. "Hallifax, Samuel (1733–1790)." Oxford Dictionary of National Biography. Ed. H. C. G. Matthew and Brian Harrison. Oxford: OUP, 2004. 7 May 2007.
- Page, Anthony. "'A Great Politicianess': Ann Jebb, rational dissent and politics in late eighteenth-century Britain", Women's History Review, 17:5 (2008), pp. 743–765. doi:10.1080/09612020802316736
- Page, Anthony. John Jebb and the Enlightenment Origins of British Radicalism. Praeger Publishers, 2003. ISBN 0-275-97775-7
- Page, Anthony (2010). "No effort can be lost': the Unitarianism and Republicanism of Ann Jebb (1735-1812)" (PDF). Enlightenment and Dissent. 26: 136–62.
