= Sir George Warburton, 3rd Baronet =

English politician

Sir George Warburton Bt
- Born: 1675; Arley Hall, Cheshire, England
- Died: 1743 (aged 67–68); Arley Hall, Cheshire, England
- Spouse: Diana Alington

Sir George Warburton, 3rd Baronet (1675–1743) was an English politician who sat in the House of Commons between 1702 and 1722.

Warburton was the eldest son of Sir Peter Warburton, 2nd Baronet and his wife Martha Docwra, daughter of Thomas Docwra of Putteridge, Hertfordshire, and was baptized on 1 June 1675. He succeeded to the baronetcy on the death of his father in about 1698. He married Diana Alington, daughter of William Alington, 1st Baron Alington of Wymondley on 18 June 1700.

Warburton was elected Member of Parliament for Cheshire at the 1702 general election, but lost the seat in 1705. He was elected again as MP for Cheshire in 1710 and 1713. He was returned again as MP for Cheshire in 1715 and held the seat until 1722. In 1724 he became Freeman of Chester 1724.

Warburton died on 23 June 1743. He and his wife had a son and two daughters. His son died young and the baronetcy passed to a nephew. His daughter Diana married Sir Richard Grosvenor, 4th Baronet as his second wife.

Parliament of Great Britain
Preceded by Sir Robert Cotton, Bt; Sir John Mainwaring, Bt	Member of Parliament for Cheshire; 1702–1705; With: Sir Roger Mostyn, Bt	Succeeded by Langham Booth; John Offley-Crewe
Preceded by Langham Booth; John Offley-Crewe	Member of Parliament for Cheshire; 1710–1722; With: Charles Cholmondeley; Langham Booth	Succeeded by Charles Cholmondeley; John Offley-Crewe
Baronetage of England
Preceded by Peter Warburton	Baronet (of Arley); 1698-1743	Succeeded by Peter Warburton
