= Peter Venables (MP) =

17th-century English politician

Peter Venables (22 April 1604 – 13 February 1669) of Kinderton, Cheshire, was an English politician who sat in the House of Commons at various times between 1640 and 1669. He supported the Royalist cause in the English Civil War.

Venables was the eldest surviving son of Thomas Venables, a "Baron of Kinderton", and his wife Anne Gargrave, daughter of Sir Cotton Gargrave of Nostell Priory, Yorkshire, and educated at Lincoln's Inn. He succeeded his father in 1605, inheriting eight manors in Cheshire and saltworks in Nantwich and Middlewich and was pricked High Sheriff of Cheshire in 1633–34.

In November 1640, he was elected Member of Parliament for Cheshire in the Long Parliament. He supported the King in the Civil War and was disabled from sitting on 22 January 1644.

In 1661, after the Restoration of the Monarchy, Venables was again elected MP for Cheshire in the Cavalier Parliament, holding the seat until his death.

Venables died in 1669 at the age of 64. He had married firstly Mary Wilbraham, daughter of Sir Richard Wilbraham of Woodhey and secondly Frances Cholmondeley sister of Sir Robert Cholmondeley.

Parliament of England
Preceded by Sir Thomas Aston, Bt; Sir William Brereton, Bt	Member of Parliament for Cheshire; 1640–1644; With: Sir William Brereton, Bt	Succeeded by George Booth; Sir William Brereton, Bt
Preceded by Sir Thomas Mainwaring, Bt; George Booth	Member of Parliament for Cheshire; 1661–1670; With: The Lord Brereton 1661–1664; Sir Fulk Lucy 1664–1670	Succeeded by Thomas Cholmondeley; Sir Fulk Lucy
