= Salusbury baronets of Lleweni (1619) =

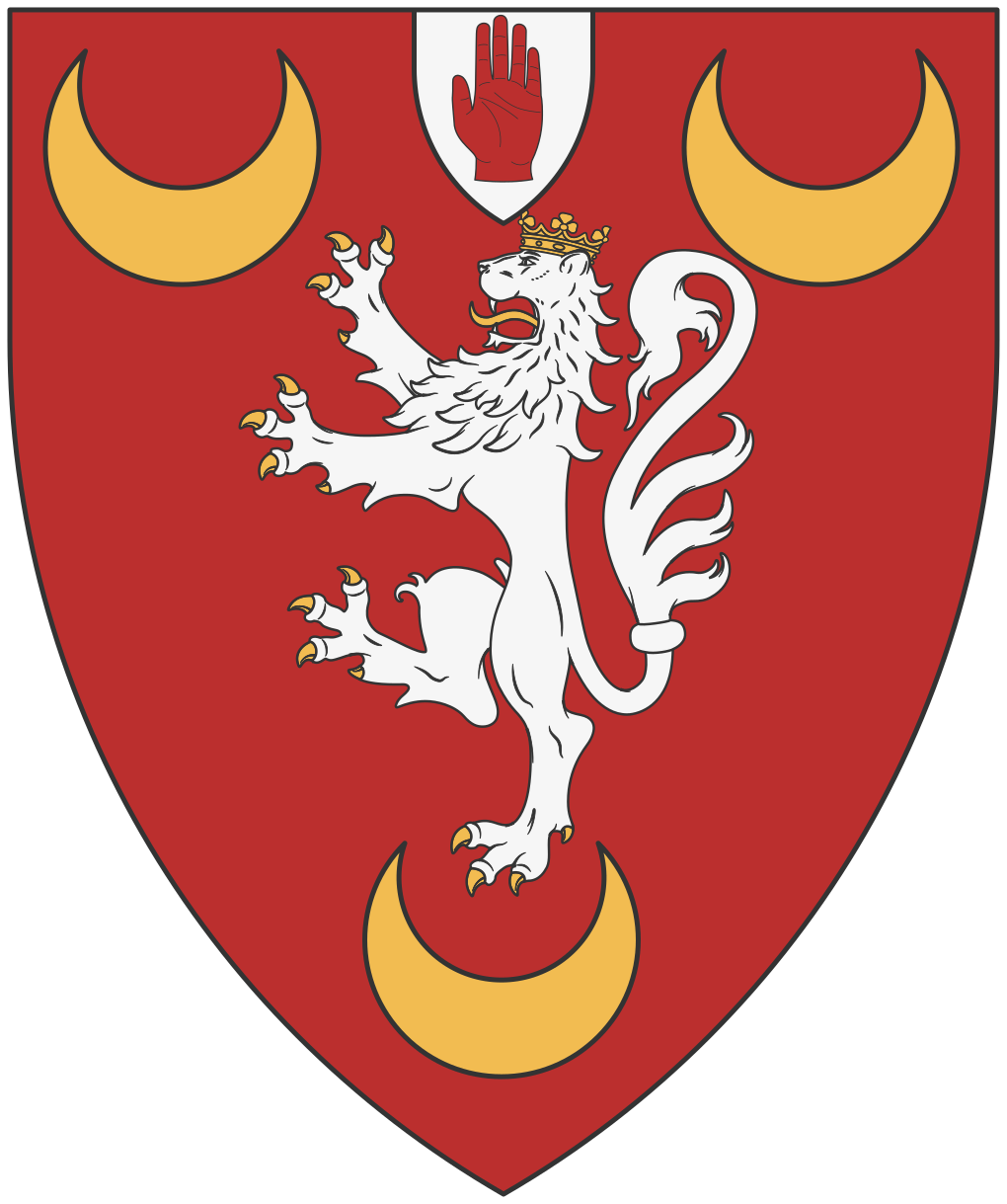
Escutcheon of the Salusbury baronets of Lleweni

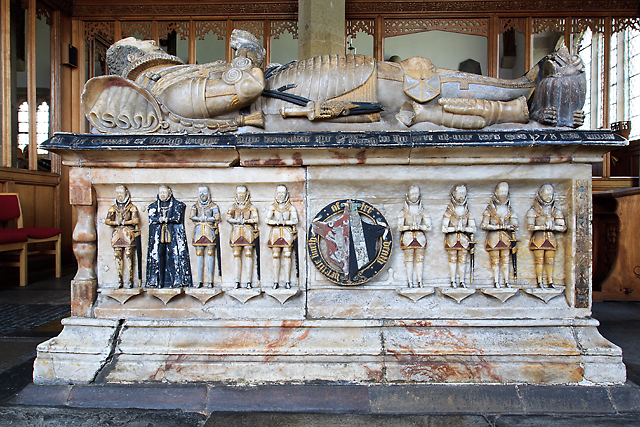
A photograph taken of the sarcophagus of Sir John Salusbury, Kt. (died 1578) and Dame Catherine Salusbury (née Myddleton) (1515–1588)

The Salusbury baronetcy, of Lleweny in the County of Denbigh in the Baronetage of England was created on 10 November 1619 for Sir Henry Salusbury, son of John Salusbury, and grandson of Katheryn of Berain.

His only son the 2nd Baronet was Member of Parliament for Denbighshire in the Short Parliament; and served on Charles I's council of war at the Battle of Edgehill. On his death in 1643, his title passed to his eldest son, the 3rd Baronet. He was succeeded by his younger brother, the 4th Baronet, Member of Parliament for Denbigh Boroughs and Deputy Lieutenant of Denbighshire from 1661 until his death in 1684. He left no male issue, and the title became dormant.

== Salusbury baronets, of Lleweni (1619) ==
- Sir Henry Salusbury, 1st Baronet (1589–1632)
- Sir Thomas Salusbury, 2nd Baronet (1612–1643)
- Sir Thomas Salusbury, 3rd Baronet (1634–1658)
- Sir John Salusbury, 4th Baronet (died 1684)

== Extended family ==
The last family member with a direct blood connection to the Lleweni baronetcy was Hester Piozzi, who attempted to secure a collateral succession to the title from the College of Arms on behalf of her adopted son, John Salusbury Piozzi-Salusbury. In January 1813 she petitioned the college to grant her son the heraldic rights to the Lleweni legacy and Garter complied with her memorial by issuing letters patent dated 6 December 1813. On 24 April 1817 he was made a Knight Bachelor and Piozzi now sought to convert her son's title into a baronetcy. In 1820 she gave Salusbury £6,000 for this express purpose, but he took no further action to obtain the baronetcy.
