= Sir Robert Cotton, 1st Baronet, of Combermere =

English politician

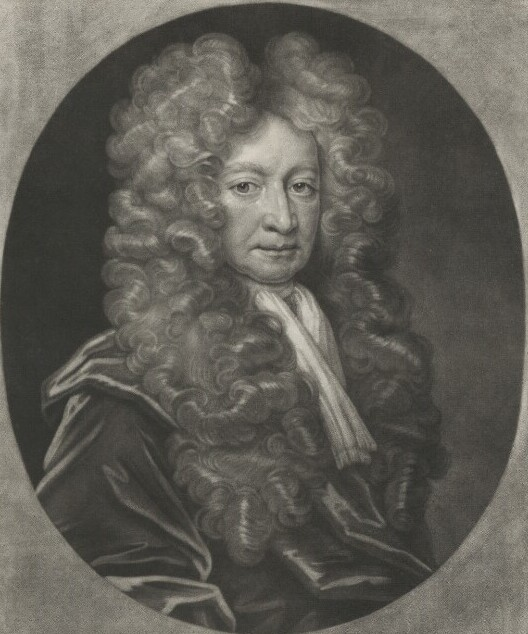
1706 mezzotint of Cotton

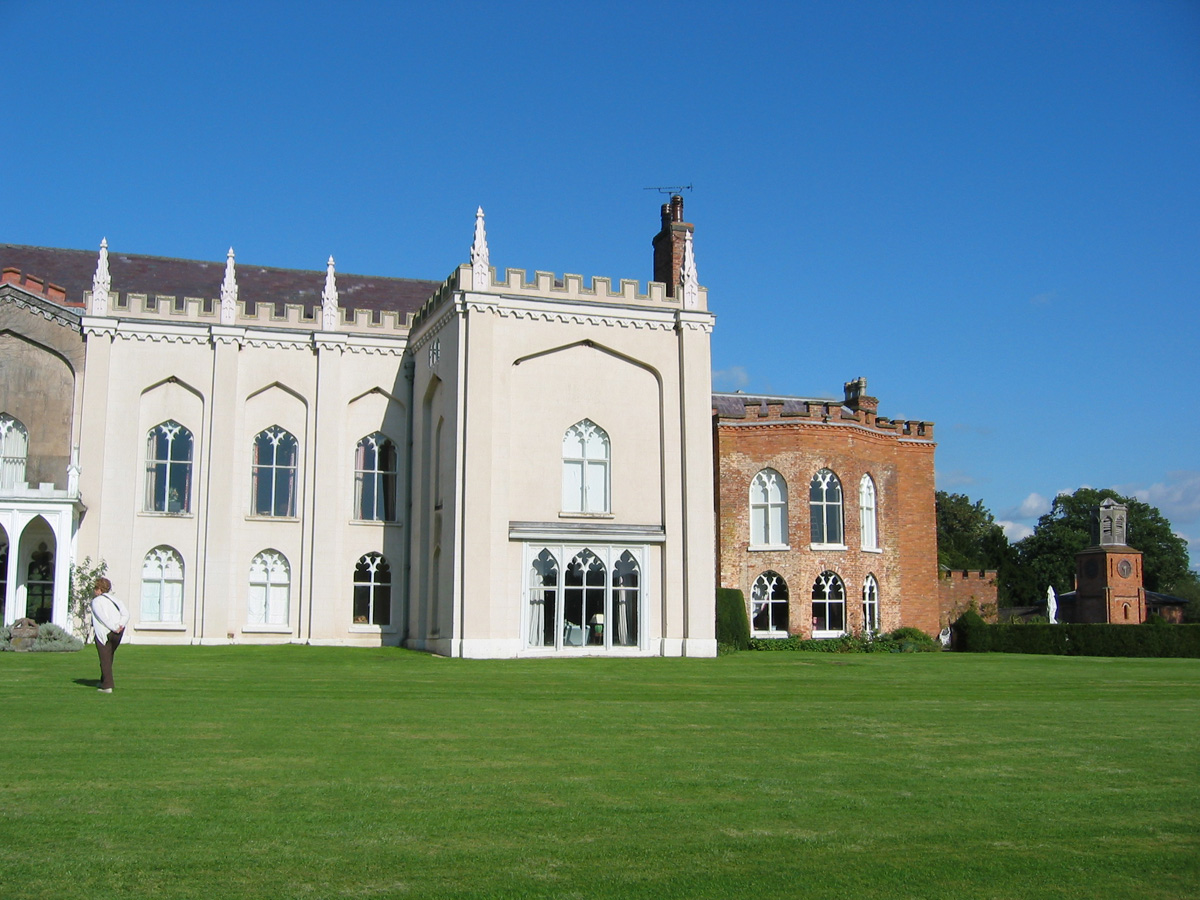
Combermere Abbey

Sir Robert Cotton, 1st Baronet (c. 1635 – 18 December 1712) was an English Whig politician. He was Member of Parliament (MP) for Cheshire from 1679 to 1681 and from 1689 to 1702.

He was the eldest surviving son of Thomas Cotton of Combermere Abbey, Cheshire, and his wife Elizabeth Calveley, daughter of Sir George Calveley of Lea (aka Calverley). His ancestor Sir George Cotton was granted Combermere by Henry VIII in about 1541. In 1677 he was made Baronet of Combermere in the County Palatine of Chester. After he was accused of treasonable correspondence with the Electress of Hanover, Sophia, in 1685 he was committed to the Tower of London by the Earl of Sunderland, Secretary of State for the Southern Department. He was eventually cleared of the charges in part by the testimony of some of his political opponents.

In politics he was a staunch Whig and opponent of James II. He welcomed the Glorious Revolution but did not play a leading role in politics thereafter. Historians consider his voting pattern to be proto-"Country", which irked some of the less independent Whigs of his era. He was considered a principled and honest man.

In 1684 he married Hester Salusbury, daughter and sole heir of the Royalist politician and soldier Sir Thomas Salusbury and his wife Hester Tyrrell. As a result, the family's seat at Combermere Abbey was enhanced with the Llewenni Estate in Denbighshire, northeast Wales. The couple had the following known issue, (out of a possible sixteen children in all):

- Hugh-Calveley Cotton, who married Mary, only daughter and heiress of Sir William Russell, 1st Baronet of Langherne and his wife Hester Rouse.

Hugh-Calveley died before his father and left an only daughter, Catherine, who married Thomas Lewis, Esq. of St Pierre, Monmouthshire.

- Sir Thomas Cotton, 2nd Baronet, of Combermere
- Mary Cotton, who married Sir William Fowler, of Harnage Grange.
- Anne Cotton, who married Sir Thomas Taylor, 1st Baronet; she was the grandmother of the 1st Earl of Bective
- Arabella Cotton, who married Henry Tichborne, 1st Baron Ferrard and had issue.

== Ancestry ==
Ancestors of Sir Robert Cotton, 1st Baronet, of Combermere

16. Sir George Cotton (d. 25 March 1545), granted Combermere Abbey by Henry VIII in 1541
8. Richard Cotton of Combermere Abbey (d. 14 June 1602)
17. Mary Onley (d. 13 March 1560)
4. George Cotton of Combermere Abbey (d. 1649)
18. Arthur Mainwaring of Ightfield (1525–1590)
9. Mary Mainwaring (d. 14 June 1578)
19. Dorothea Corbet
2. Thomas Cotton of Combermere Abbey, Cheshire (c.1586-1647)
20. George Bromley of Hodnet, High Sheriff of Shropshire
10. Sir George Bromley (d. 2 March 1589)
21. Jane Lacon
5. Mary Bromley
22. John Waverton of Worfield
11. Joan Waverton (d. 19 November 1606)
23. Alicia Barker of Hallon
1. Sir Robert Cotton, 1st Baronet
6. Sir George Calveley of Lea
3. Elizabeth Calveley (b. 1 August 1609)

Parliament of the United Kingdom
| Preceded by Sir Philip Egerton and Hon. Henry Booth | Member of Parliament for Cheshire; 1679–1681; With: Hon. Henry Booth | Succeeded by Sir Philip Egerton and Thomas Cholmondeley |
| Preceded by Sir Philip Egerton and Thomas Cholmondeley | Member of Parliament for Cheshire; 1689–1702; With: Sir John Mainwaring, Bt. | Succeeded by Sir George Warburton, Bt. and Sir Roger Mostyn, Bt. |
Baronetage of England
| New creation | Baronet (of Combermere ) 1677–1712 | Succeeded by Thomas Cotton |
