= Richard Hough (politician) =

English politician (1505–1574)

The Honourable Richard Hough
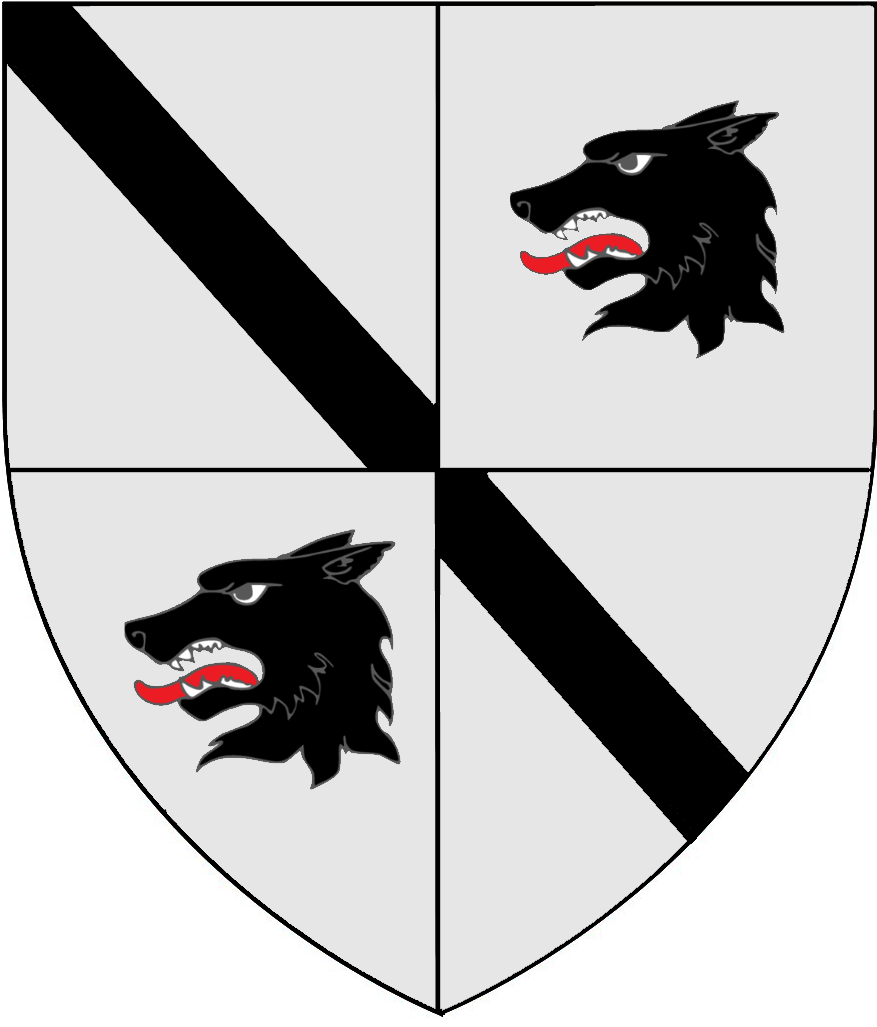
- Arms of Hough: Quarterly 1 and 4 Argent, a bend Sable, 2 and 3 Argent, a wolf's head, erased, Sable

Member of Parliament for Cheshire
- In office 1558–1558
- Preceded by: Sir Lawrence Smith
- Succeeded by: Sir William Brereton

Personal details
- Born: 5 November 1505 Leighton, Wirral
- Died: 10 December 1574 (aged 69)
- Resting place: St Mary's and St Helen's Church, Neston, Cheshire; 53.2892°N 3.0643°W
- Spouses: Christian Calverley; Margaret Hurleston
- Children: with Christian: William Hough; Thomas Hough; John Hough; Anthony Hough; Henry Hough
- Parents: Thomas Hough; Catherine Grosvenor

Richard Hough (5 November 1505 – 10 December 1574), of Leighton and Thornton Hough in the Wirral Hundred was an English landowner and politician. He was elected MP for Cheshire in 1558 under Mary I and after the accession of Elizabeth I was appointed a commissioner of the peace for Cheshire in 1562.

== Early life ==
Hough was born at Leighton in the Wirral Hundred, the eldest son of Thomas Hough (died 1513) of Leighton and Thornton Hough and Catherine Grosvenor, daughter of Thomas Grosvenor of Eaton, Cheshire. He was six years old when his father died in June 1513, but nothing is known of his wardship, upbringing or education.

== Career ==
He was in the service of Thomas Cromwell from around 1534 until 1540. In 1536 he appears more specifically as one of the Lord Privy Seal’s men, being then described as a "sage and sober person": he was not in regular service but was one of those to be allowed in the household only "when they have commandment or cause necessary to repair thither". Hough acted as Cromwell's agent in Chester, and in January 1538 he reminded the minister of a promise to make him rider of Delamere Forest in Cheshire. In 1540 he carried messages and letters to the council in Ireland.

After Cromwell's death, Hough served with his brother-in-law, Sir Hugh Calverley, in the Scottish campaign in 1544. His eldest son, William, married the late minister's illegitimate daughter, Jane. William Hough, a former pupil of Nicholas Sanders and a servant of Sir Francis Englefield, was the only member of his family of the Catholic faith.

In 1558, Richard was elected senior knight of the shire for Cheshire and following Elizabeth I's accession served as commissioner of the peace for Cheshire from 1562 until his death in 1574. In his support for the new religious settlement with which the bishop of Chester credited him in 1564 he differed from his son William who suffered imprisonment and sequestration as a recusant.

== Marriages and children ==
He married, firstly, Christian Calverley, daughter of Sir George Calverley of Lea, Cheshire, by whom he had five sons:

- William Hough (c. 1527 – 10 February 1585) married Jane Cromwell (died 1580), illegitimate daughter of Thomas Cromwell (c. 1485 – 1540) of London, with whom he had a daughter:
  - Alice Hough (born 1550) married William Whitmore of Thurstaston.
- Thomas Hough (died 1580) married Elizabeth Wilbraham, daughter of Richard Wilbraham of Woodhey, Cheshire.
- John Hough
- Anthony Hough
- Henry Hough

He married, secondly, Margaret Hurleston (died 1573), daughter of James Hurleston of Chester and widow of William Hocknell (died 1563) of Prenton, by whom he had no children:

== Death ==
He died on 10 December and was buried on 13 December 1574 at the parish church, at Neston, Cheshire. The Wirral manors of Leighton and Thornton Hough passed to his son, William.

== Sources ==
- Beazley, F. C. (1908). Notes on the Parish of Burton in Wirral. Illustrated with seven plates and numerous coats of arms drawn by Graham Johnston, Herald Painter to the Lyon Court. Liverpool, UK: Henry Young & Sons.
- Edwards, P. S. (1982). "Hough, Richard (1505-73/74), of Leighton and Thornton Hough, Cheshire". In Bindoff, S. T. (ed.). The History of Parliament: the House of Commons 1509-1558. Archived from the original on 3 January 2015 – via History of Parliament Online.
- Glover, Robert (1882). Rylands, John Paul (ed.). The Visitation of Cheshire in the year 1580, made by Robert Glover, Somerset Herald, for William Flower, Norroy King of Arms: with numerous additions and continuations, including those from the Visitation of Cheshire made in the year 1566 by the same herald : with an appendix containing the Visitation of a part of Cheshire in the year 1533, made by William Fellows, Lancaster Herald, for Thomas Benolte, Clarenceux King of Arms: and a fragment of the Visitation of the city of Chester in the year 1591, made by Thomas Chaloner, Deputy to the Office of Arms. Publications of the Harleian Society. Vol. 18. London: Harleian Society.
- Johnson, Clare (2007–2008). "The Travels and Trials of a Sixteenth-Century Wirral Recusant". Cheshire History. 47: 22–33.
- MacCulloch, Diarmaid (2018). Thomas Cromwell: A Life. London: Allen Lane. ISBN 9780141967660.
- Ormerod, George; Helsby, Thomas (1882). The History of the County Palatine and City of Chester: Compiled from Original Evidences in Public Offices the Harleian and Cottonian Mss. Parochial Registers Private Muniments Unpublished Ms. Collections of Successive Cheshire Antiquaries and a Personal Survey of Every Township in the County; Incorporated with a Republication of King's Hale Royal and Leycester's Cheshire Antiquities. Vol. 2 (2nd ed.). George Routledge and Sons. OCLC 223243317.
- Robertson, Mary Louise (1975). Thomas Cromwell's Servants: the Ministerial Household in Early Tudor Government and Society (PhD thesis). University of California, Los Angeles.
