= Sir John Salusbury, 4th Baronet =

Sir John Salusbury, 4th Baronet (died 23 May 1684) was an English politician who sat in the House of Commons from 1661 to 1685.

Salusbury was the son of Sir Thomas Salusbury, 2nd Baronet and his wife Hester, daughter of Sir Edward Tyrrell, 1st Baronet and Elizabeth Kingsmill. He was a minor when he succeeded to the baronetcy on the death of his brother, Thomas, in 1658. In 1660, Salusbury was elected Member of Parliament for Denbigh Boroughs. He was re-elected MP for Denbigh in the two elections of 1679 and in 1681.

Salusbury died without issue in May 1684 when the baronetcy became extinct. The family home, Lleweni Hall, passed to his sister, Hester, who married Sir Robert Cotton.

Salusbury married Jane Williams, daughter of Edward Williams of Weige, Caernarvonshire.

Parliament of England
Preceded by John Carter	Member of Parliament for Denbigh Boroughs. 1661–1684	Succeeded by Sir John Trevor
Baronetage of England
Preceded by Thomas Salusbury	Baronet (of Lleweni); 1658–1684	Extinct
