= Wilbraham Egerton =

Wilbraham Egerton may refer to:

- Wilbraham Egerton (MP for Cheshire) (1781–1856) of Tatton Park, British MP for Cheshire
- Wilbraham Egerton, 1st Earl Egerton (1832–1909) of Tatton Park, MP for North Cheshire and Mid Cheshire
