= Emma Crewe =

British artist (1780–1850)

- Miss Emma Crewe and Miss Elizabeth Crewe by John Dixon after Sir Joshua Reynolds
- Born: 14 July 1741; London
- Died: c1795
- Spouse: Foster Cunliffe-Offley
- Relatives: Elizabeth Shuttleworth (mother); John Crewe (father); Elizabeth Crewe (sister); John Crewe (brother); Frances Crewe (sister-in-law)

Emma Crewe (born 1741, d. in or after 1795) was a British artist known for her designs for Josiah Wedgwood, and for her botanical art.

== Life ==
Emma Crewe was the daughter of Elizabeth Shuttleworth, herself daughter of Richard Shuttleworth (1683–1749), MP for Lancashire (1705–49), and John Crewe (1709–1752), MP for Cheshire (1734–52). She was the second of six children and was particularly close to her younger sister Elizabeth (1744–1826). Crewe did not marry. She was financially secure due to a family trust set up by her father before his death, and she lived part of the time with her brother John Crewe, 1st Baron Crewe and his wife, society hostess Frances Crewe, Lady Crewe, through whom she met Josiah Wedgwood.

== Work ==
Along with Diana Beauclerk (1734–1808) and Elizabeth Templetown (1747–1823), Crewe contributed designs in the Romantic style to Josiah Wedgwood for reproduction in his studio in Rome.

Crewe also made botanical art. She was part of Erasmus Darwin's circle and painted the Frontispiece to his The Loves of the Plants (2nd Ed., 1790). She was criticized for this piece by Richard Polwhele in The Unsex'd Females: "There is a charming delicacy in most of the pictures of Miss Emma Crewe; though I think, in her "Flora at play with Cupid," … she has rather overstepped the modesty of nature, by giving the portrait an air of voluptuousness too luxuriously melting."

Her drawings and designs are held by the British Museum, the Victoria and Albert Museum, and other notable institutions.

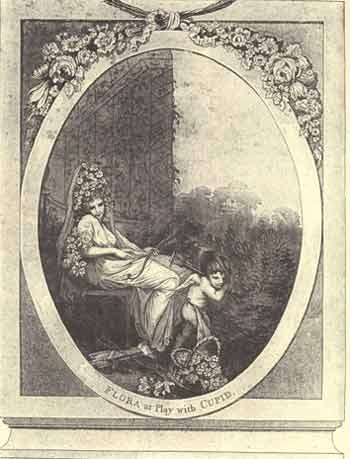
Emma Crewe, "Flora at Play with Cupid." Frontispiece to Erasmus Darwin's The Loves of the Plants

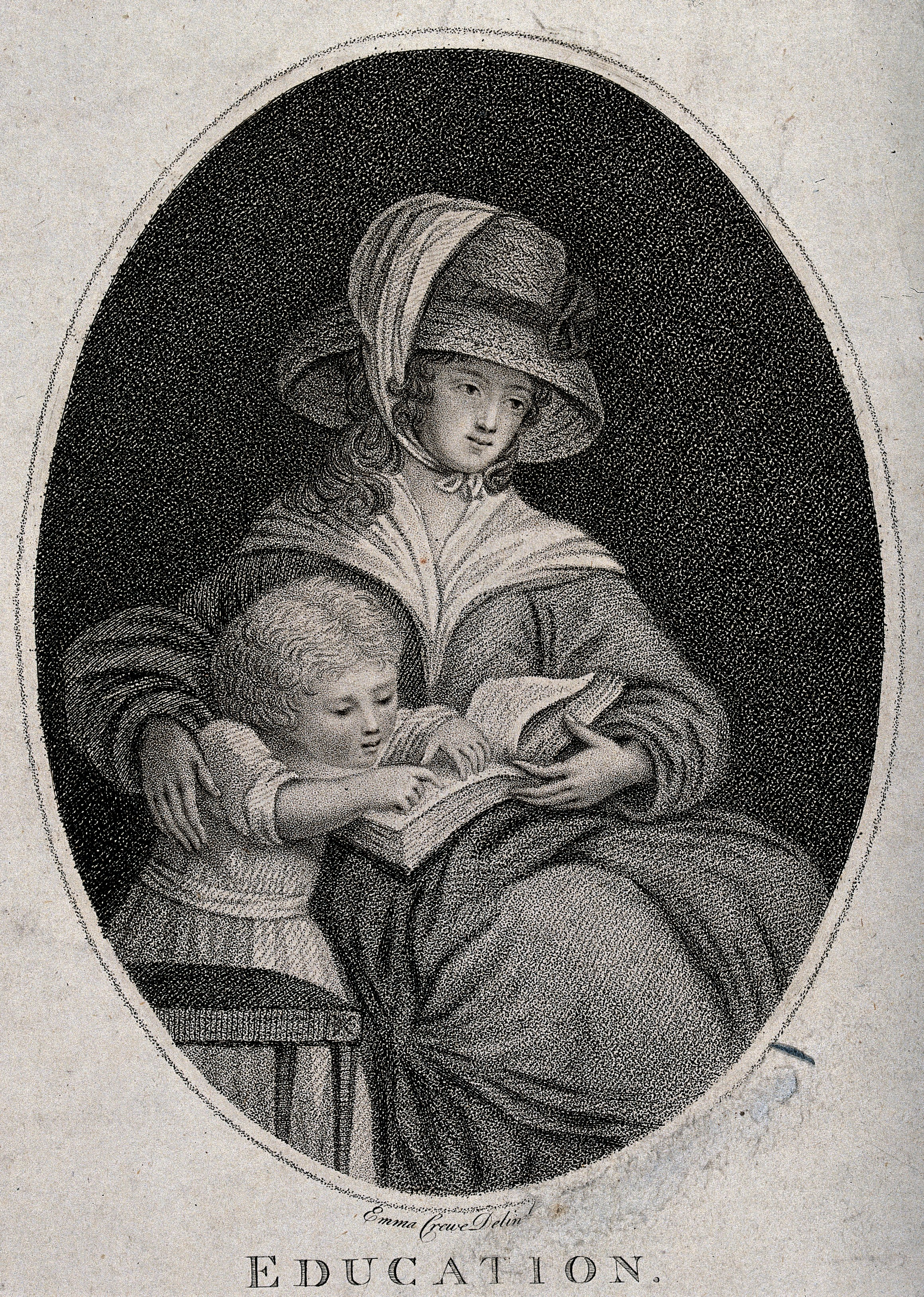
A young woman sits with a book on her knee and a child by her side. Stipple engraving by Emma Crewe, 1783. (Wellcome Collection)

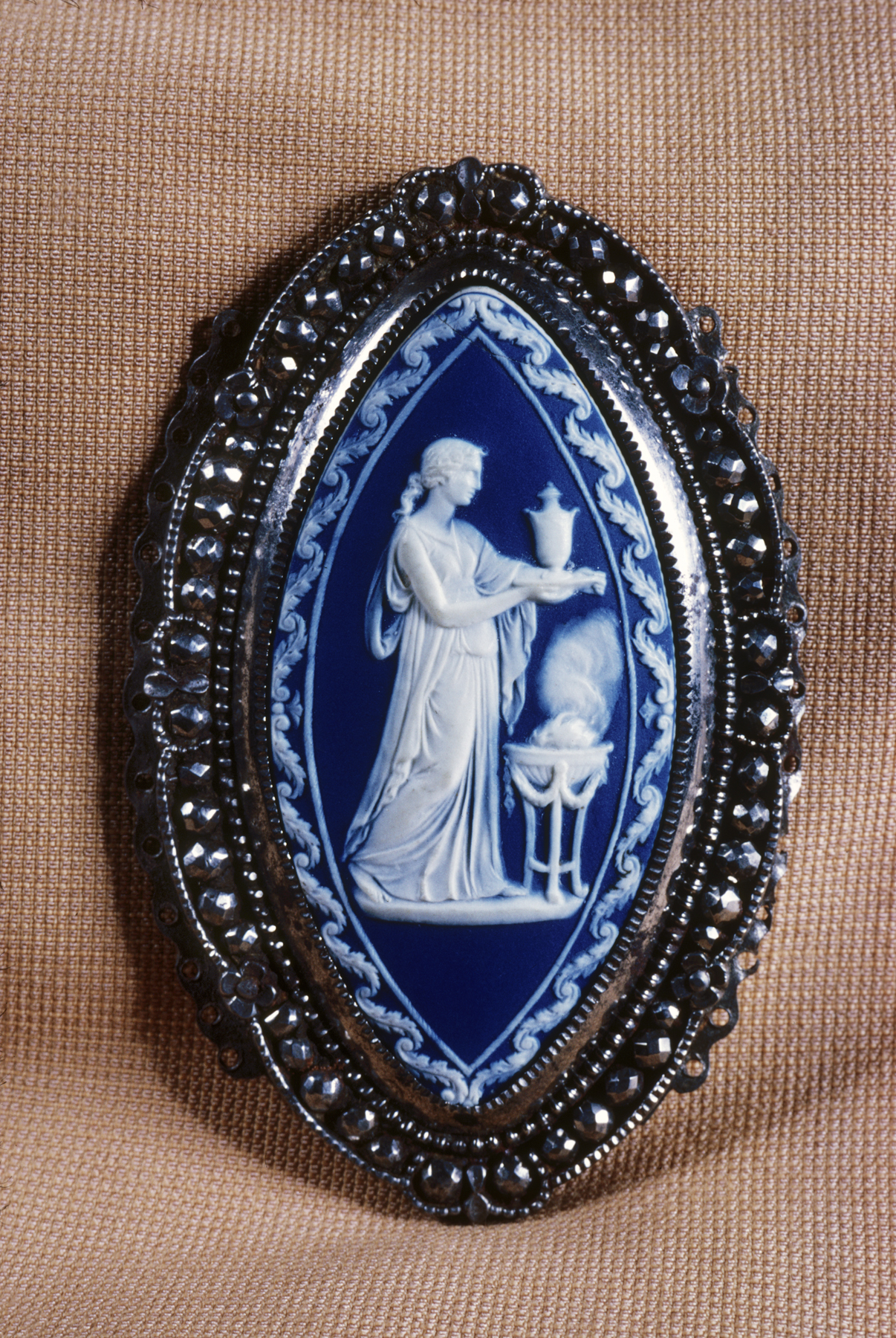
Belt clasp designed by Lady Templeton and Emma Crewe for Josiah Wedgwood's factory. Jasperware, steel, tin. The Walters Art Museum

== See also ==
- Jasperware
- Wedgwood
