= Polwhele House School =

Location
- Polwhele House; Truro, Cornwall, TR4 9AE; England; 50.28549°N 5.03700°W

Information
- Type: Private day
- Motto: Karenza whelas Karenza (Cornish for Love begets Love)
- Established: 1981; 45 years ago
- Head of school: Mark Clutsom
- Gender: Mixed
- Age range: 3–16
- Enrolment: 104 (2026)
- Campus size: 32 acres
- Houses: Kinins, Mordros, Steren and Tredan
- Colours: Blue, Red and White
- Publication: The Polwheler
- Affiliation: Independent Association of Prep Schools
- Website: polwhelehouse.co.uk

Polwhele House School is a co-educational, independent school located at Polwhele House, near Truro, Cornwall, United Kingdom.

The school currently accepts pupils from Nursery (age 3) to GCSE, with the first Year 11 GCSE examinations taking place in Summer 2027.

== History ==
In 1976 one the school’s founders, Rosemary White, launched a nursery and pre-prep school in her family home in Truro, calling it Boscawen Rose School. This was a school for children aged between three and eight. By 1981, the high demand for places had encouraged Rosemary and her husband Richard White to open a new school at Polwhele House, transferring most of the Boscawen Rose School pupils there and including older children. They were joint heads of the new enterprise, which was to be a co-educational preparatory school. At that time, the leaving age increased to thirteen.

After Truro Cathedral School closed in July 1982, its task of educating and training the cathedral's boy choristers was transferred to Polwhele House, and the number of choristers is now eighteen. The chorister programme ended in the mid 2010s.

The Whites retired as joint heads in 2002.

== School site ==
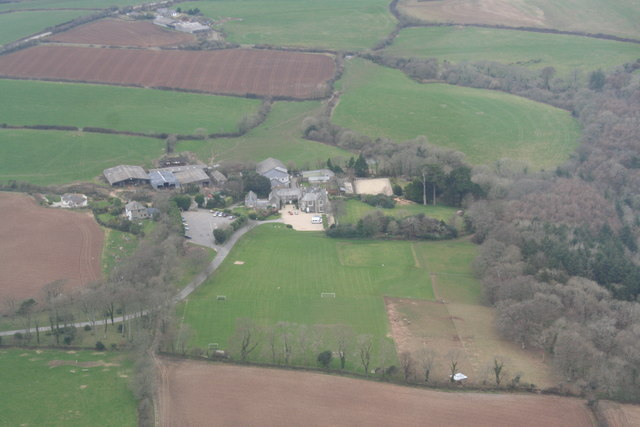
Aerial view of the school

Polwhele House is a Grade II listed manor house, standing in 32 acres of parkland, playing fields, gardens, and woods, about two miles north of Truro.

The earliest parts of the main house date from the 16th century, and granite arches from that time are the oldest features still to be seen. Richard Polwhele, a clergyman and local historian, inherited the property from his father and in the 1820s renovated the coach house. In the 1860s, Thomas Carne Polwhele had the house remodelled and enlarged by Giles Gilbert Scott. The Polwhele family motto, "Karenza Whelas Karenza", meaning "Love begets Love", is engraved on a stone chimneypiece in the drawing room of the house and has been adopted as the school’s motto.

== Curriculum ==
Polwhele House follows a syllabus leading to the Common Entrance Examination at 13-plus.

There is a focus on music and drama, with concerts and productions taking place regularly throughout the year and most children taking part in them.

A new Year 9 class will begin in September 2020, with the school’s leaving age then slowly rising to sixteen. The head, Hilary Mann, said in January 2020 "The school will grow by one senior year group each year, slowly and steadily. Our current buildings give scope for the first year expansion, and in time we can plan a redesign of the buildings and look to add any necessary new buildings."

== Extracurricular activities & facilities ==
The school has its own stables, walled garden, forest school, playing fields and 32 acres of grounds.

Polwhele House School currently offers three scholarship programmes, in Equestrian, Sports and Performing Arts (PAS).

In May 2012, the Olympic torch came to the school. In May 2017, it was visited by a Royal Navy Merlin maritime helicopter based at RNAS Culdrose, and children were able to explore and discuss it with its crew.

== List of heads ==
- 1981–2002: Rosemary and Richard White (jointly)
- 2002–2009: Jeremy Mason, previously deputy head at the Pilgrims' School, Winchester
- 2009–2019: Alex McCullough, previously Director of Studies at Foremarke Hall
- 2019-2024: Hilary Mann, previously head of Roselyon Preparatory School, Lanlivery
- 2024-2025: Emma Edward, previously Founder and Head of Pre-Prep at Wotton House International School, Gloucester
- 2025: Mark Clutsom

A deputy head of the school, Dominic Floyd, went on to become head of Ashdown House, and then of Hazlegrove and the Mount Kelly Prep School.

== Notable former pupils ==
- Charlie Shreck (born 1978), cricketer
