= Warburton baronets =

Extinct baronetcy in the Baronetage of England

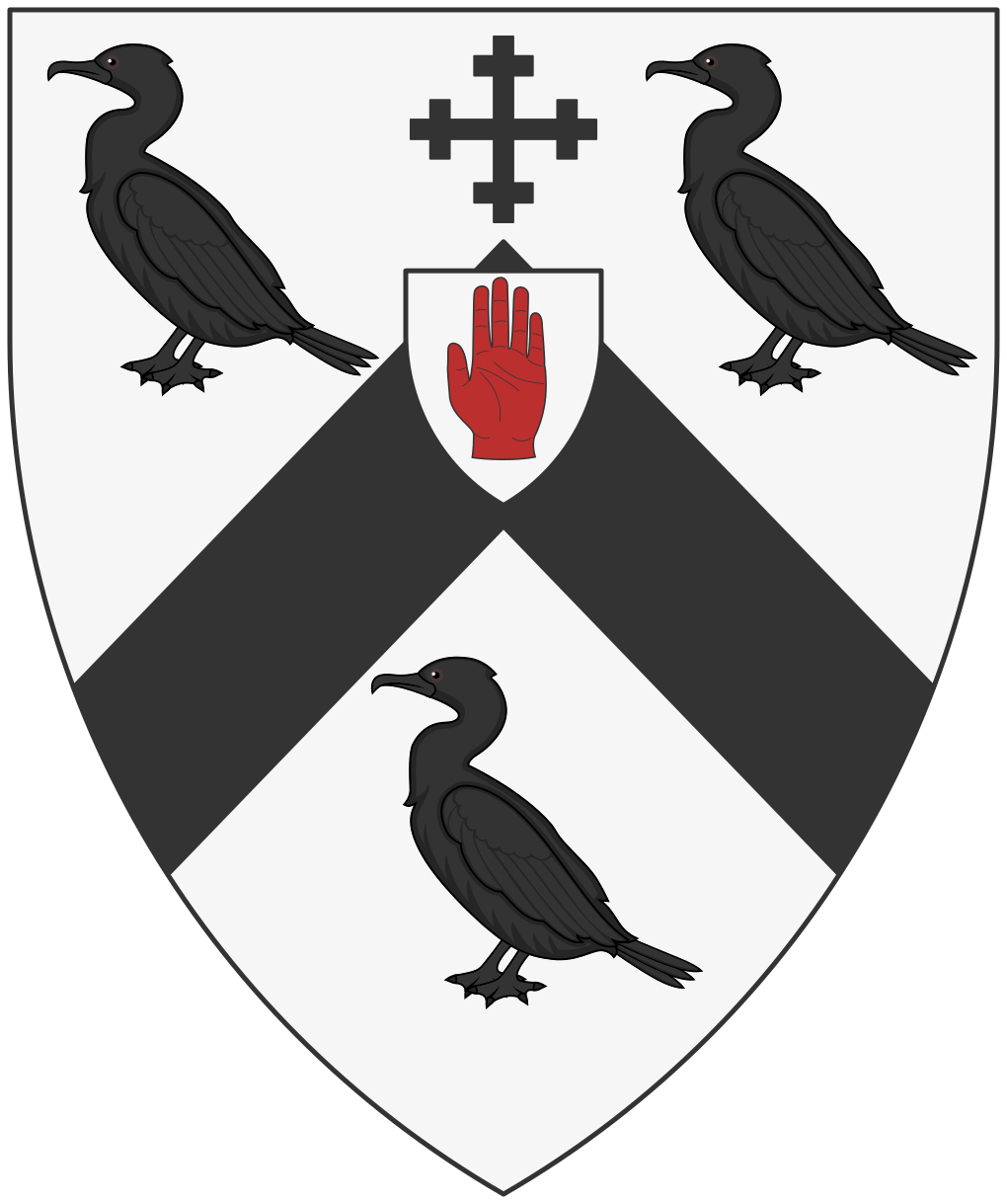
Warburton arms

The Warburton baronetcy, of Arley in the County of Chester, was a title in the Baronetage of England. It was created on 27 June 1660 by Charles II for George Warburton, of Arley Hall, Cheshire, whose great-uncle had been Sergeant-at-Law and a Justice of Common Pleas in the time of Charles I. The Warburton family removed from Warburton, Cheshire to Arley in the 14th century. The third Baronet represented Cheshire as a Knight of the Shire. The title became extinct on the death of the fifth Baronet in 1813. The Cheshire estates passed into the Egerton-Warburton family and now to Viscountess Ashbrook.

== Warburton baronets, of Arley (1660) ==
- Sir George Warburton, 1st Baronet (1622–1676)
- Sir Peter Warburton, 2nd Baronet (died 1698)
- Sir George Warburton, 3rd Baronet (1675–1743)
- Sir Peter Warburton, 4th Baronet (1708–1774)
- Sir Peter Warburton, 5th Baronet (1754–1813)
