= John Watson Tadwell Watson =

British army officer

John Watson Tadwell Watson (1748–1826) was a British army officer.

Born in London in 1748, Watson entered the 3rd Regiment of Foot Guards as an ensign in April 1767 and on 28 April 1773 became captain. In that rank, in mid-1778, he sailed to join the Guards detachment that had been drafted for service in North America. He was promoted to lieutenant colonel and given command of a corps of British American light infantry, having replaced Charles Stanhope, 3rd Earl of Harrington. Fifteen men from each company of the 1st Regiment of Foot Guards, Coldstream Regiment of Foot Guards and the 3rd Regiment of Foot Guards, formed a composite battalion of Foot Guards to be sent to North America. The composite battalion was subsequently split into two battalions. He was promoted to colonel in 1783 and to general in April 1808.

He has been described as 'typical of many a Guards officer down the years, seemingly puffed up with self-importance and reluctant to obey or cooperate with ranking officers.'

He married Frances, daughter of John Crewe, of Cheshire, England. He died in Calais, France, on 11 June 1826.
