= Walter Davenport Bromley =

English clergyman and art collector (1787–1862)

Walter Davenport Bromley (born Walter Davenport; 5 February 1787 – 1 December 1862) was a Church of England clergyman and art collector. Four paintings previously owned by him are now in the National Gallery, London, three each in the J. Paul Getty Museum, Fitzwilliam Museum and the Metropolitan Museum of Art, eight in the Courtauld Gallery and one each in the Brera Academy and the National Gallery of Ireland.

He became vicar of Ellastone and his only child was the future Conservative MP William Bromley-Davenport.

== Life ==
Born the fourth child and youngest son of Davies Davenport and Charlotte Sneyd, he only assumed the surname Bromley on inheriting Wootton Hall and Baginton from a distant relation in 1822. He only began collecting during an 1844 trip to Florence and Rome, collecting over 170 early Italian works by 1860, almost entirely religious works. He bought over forty works at the sale of the majority of Cardinal Joseph Fesch's collection in 1845, then twelve from William Young Ottley's collection and from all the major collection sales at Christie's between 1847 and 1860, including that of Louis-Philippe of France. He also acquired Greek vases Only eight of the 174 lots at the posthumous sale of his collection failed to find buyers and were (with a small number of paintings) bought back by his son William.
