= Sir Thomas Salusbury, 2nd Baronet =

Welsh poet, politician and soldier

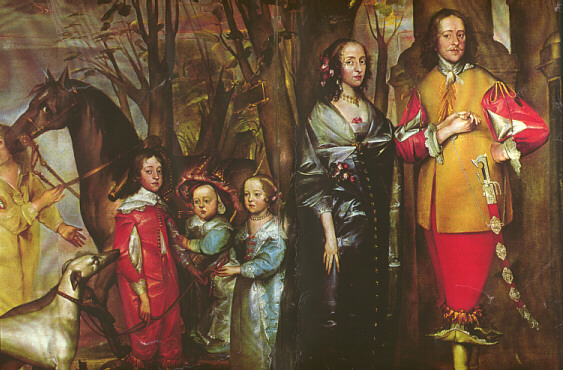

Sir Thomas Salusbury, 2nd Baronet (March 1612 – 1643) was a Welsh poet, politician and soldier, who supported King Charles I in English Civil War and was a colonel of a Royalist regiment. (Note: His name is also spelt Sir Thomas Salisbury and Sir Thomas Salesbury (see for example (The Battlefields Trust, Fletcher & Jones 2004) and Thomas 1897, p. 195).)

== Life ==
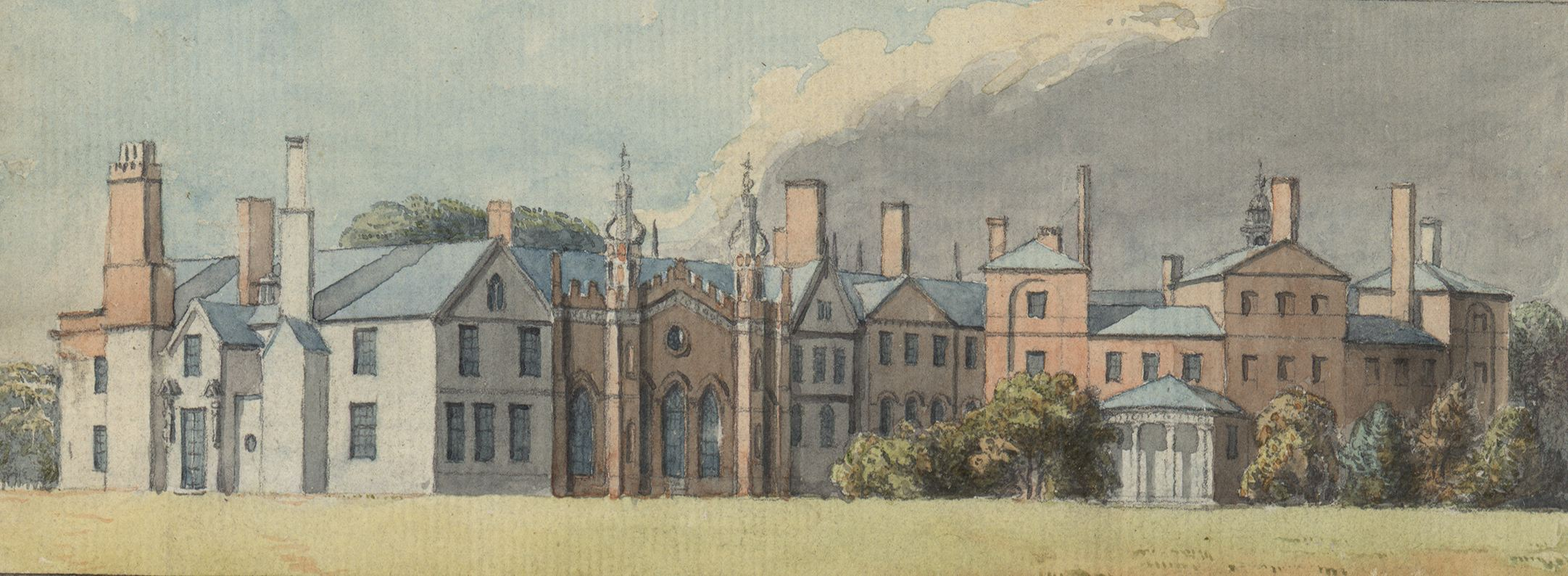
Lleweni hall, the family seat

Salusbury was born in March 1612, the eldest son of Sir Henry Salusbury of Lleweni, the first of the Salusbury Baronets. After spending some time at Jesus College, Oxford, without taking a degree, he entered the Inner Temple in November 1631 but left in July 1632 on the death of his father to take control of the family estate at Lleweni Hall, Denbighshire.

He was a member of the commission of the peace for Flintshire and Denbighshire, Wales and was elected to the common council of the Denbigh corporation in 1632. He was MP for Denbighshire in the Short Parliament of 1640, but said little; his relative Sir Thomas Myddleton succeeded him in the Long Parliament.

During the English Civil War he was on the side of Charles I, becoming colonel of a royalist regiment (Sir Thomas Salusbury’s Regiment of Foot) recruited from North Wales. His efforts on behalf of the King led to the House of Commons calling him a traitor. He fought at the Battle of Edgehill and was awarded an honorary DCL Oxford degree by the King a few days later. He fell ill at Worcester and died aged 31, being buried in the family vault at Whitchurch on 13 July 1643. (Note: A portrait of Salisbury was formerly at Llewenny, and is described by Pennant.)

== Poetry ==
Salusbury was regarded as a noted poet, but only The History of Joseph was published when he was alive (in 1636), although there are manuscripts of other poems and dramatic works. Anthony Wood (1632–1695) wrote that "having a natural geny to poetry and romance", he became "a most noted poet of his time"; but his only known production is The History of Joseph (London, 1636, 4to), "a very rare poem" and a "scarce volume", dedicated to Lady Myddelton or Middleton, fourth wife and widow of the author's grandfather, Sir Thomas Myddelton, as an acknowledgement of her care for him in his youth. Among the commendatory verses printed at the beginning are some by two kinsmen of the author (John Salusbury senior and junior respectively), the latter most probably being of Bachegraig, Flintshire, and an ancestor of Mrs. Piozzi.

== Family ==
He was survived by his wife, Hester (daughter of Sir Edward Tyrrell, 1st Baronet, of Thornton, Buckinghamshire and Elizabeth Kingsmill), by his sons, the 3rd Baronet Thomas, the 4th and last Baronet John and a daughter, Hester, who married Sir Robert Cotton.

== Notes ==
Baronetage of England
Preceded by Henry Salusbury	Baronet (of Lleweni); 1632–1643	Succeeded by Thomas Salusbury
