= Hugh Calverley (MP for Cheshire) =

English Member of Parliament (by 1506–1558)

Sir Hugh Calverley (by 1506–58), of Lea, Cheshire, was an English courtier, soldier, and Member of Parliament (MP).

He was a son of George Calverley of Lea and Elizabeth, daughter Piers or Peter Dutton of Dutton and Hatton.

Calverley was gentleman of the household of Henry FitzRoy, Duke of Richmond and Somerset. His brother John was a valet to Mary I of England, and served at her wedding in Winchester.

Hugh Calverley was a Member of the Parliament of England for Cheshire in 1545.

Calverly was present at the burning of Edinburgh in May 1544, where he was knighted at Leith. A "Cavarley" serving at the battle of Pinkie in 1547 was injured by a pike thrust.

He married Eleanor, daughter of Thomas Tattenhall of Bulkeley, Cheshire.

Parliament of England
New constituency	Member of Parliament for Cheshire; 1545; With: Sir Lawrence Smith	Succeeded by William Brereton; Sir Hugh Cholmley
