= John Crewe Jr. =

British politician

John Crewe Jr. (1709 – 18 September 1752) was a British politician and landowner who served as Member of Parliament (MP) for Cheshire from 1734 until his death in 1752. A member of the prominent Crewe family of Cheshire, he was a Tory and consistently opposed the government during his parliamentary career. Following his death, his brother Charles Crewe briefly succeeded him as MP for Cheshire until 1754.

== Early life ==
John Crewe Jr. was born in 1709, the eldest son of John Crewe (d. 1749) and Anne Shuttleworth, daughter of Richard Shuttleworth, MP for Lancashire. The Crewe family were established Cheshire gentry, owning Crewe Hall, a notable Jacobean mansion in the county. His siblings included Charles Crewe (1705–1776), who later succeeded him in Parliament, as well as Ranulph, Thomas, Mary, and Anne.

Crewe studied at Hart Hall, Oxford, in 1727, gaining an education typical of the landed gentry of the time. On 6 May 1738, he married Elizabeth Shuttleworth, daughter of Richard Shuttleworth of Gawthorpe, Lancashire, with whom he had two sons and four daughters, including John Crewe (1742–1829), later ennobled as the 1st Baron Crewe. Of his daughters, Emma Crewe was a British artist known for her designs for Josiah Wedgwood, and for her botanical art. Another daughter, Elizabeth, married John Hinchliffe, an English churchman and college fellow who was Master of Trinity College, Cambridge, Vice-Chancellor of the University of Cambridge, Chaplain to George III, Bishop of Peterborough, and Dean of Durham. A further daughter, Frances, married General John Watson Tadwell Watson, a British army officer.

== Political career ==
John Crewe Jr. was elected as MP for Cheshire in the 1734 general election after a contested vote, representing the county as a Tory alongside Sir Robert Salusbury Cotton, Bt. He was subsequently returned unopposed in the elections of 1741 and 1747, reflecting his strong local support among Cheshire's electorate. His tenure spanned three Parliaments of Great Britain: the 8th (1734–1741), 9th (1741–1747), and part of the 10th (1747–1754).

As a Tory, Crewe consistently voted against the Whig-dominated Administration, aligning with the opposition in parliamentary divisions. In June 1747, he was put forward by Staffordshire Tories to contest a seat against Lord Gower’s interest but was defeated and opted to retain his Cheshire seat, where he faced no opposition.

== Later life and succession ==
Crewe succeeded his father in 1749, inheriting Crewe Hall and additional estates in Cheshire and Staffordshire. His political career ended with his death on 18 September 1752 at the age of 43. His passing triggered a by-election in February 1753, in which his brother Charles Crewe was elected to replace him as MP for Cheshire, maintaining the family's representation until the general election of 1754.
