= Salusbury baronets =

Set index for Salusbury baronets

There have been two baronetcies created for members of the Salusbury family, the first in the Baronetage of England and the second in the Baronetage of Great Britain. Both are extinct.

- Salusbury baronets of Lleweni (1619)
- Salusbury baronets of Llanwern (1795)

== See also ==
- Salusbury-Trelawny baronets
- Salusbury family
