= Cheshire (constituency) =

Parliamentary constituency in the United Kingdom, 1801–1832

- Former county constituency for the House of Commons

1545–1832

Cheshire is a former United Kingdom parliamentary constituency for the county of Cheshire. It was a constituency of the House of Commons of the Parliament of England then of the Parliament of Great Britain from 1707 to 1800 and of the Parliament of the United Kingdom from 1801 to 1832.

As a county palatine it was unrepresented in Parliament until the Chester and Cheshire (Constituencies) Act 1542 (34 & 35 Hen. 8. c. 13). Cheshire was represented by two knights of the shire from 1545, with only County Durham out of the English counties being left unrepresented after that.

It was divided between the constituencies of North Cheshire and South Cheshire in 1832.

== Members of Parliament ==
=== 1545–1659 ===
- Constituency created (1545)

Year	First member	Second member
1545	Sir Lawrence Smith	Sir Hugh Calverley
1547	Sir William Brereton	Sir Hugh Cholmley
Mar 1553	Sir Thomas Holcroft	Sir Thomas Venables
Oct 1553	Sir Thomas Holcroft	Edward Fitton (the elder)
Apr 1554	Sir Henry Delves	Richard Wilbraham
Nov 1554	Sir Richard Cotton	Richard Wilbraham
1555	Sir Lawrence Smith	Richard Wilbraham
1558	Richard Hough	James Done
1559	Sir William Brereton	Sir Ralph Leycester
1563	Sir Thomas Venables	William Massye
1571	Thomas Calveley	Thomas Stanley
1572	George Calveley	William Booth
1584	Thomas Egerton	Hugh Cholmondeley
1586	Thomas Egerton	John Savage
1589	Sir George Beeston	John Savage
1593	Thomas Holcroft	John Done
1597	Sir William Brereton	Thomas Egerton
1601	Sir Peter Legh	Thomas Holcroft
1604	Sir Thomas Holcroft	Sir Roger Aston
1614	Sir William Brereton	Sir Roger Wilbraham
1621	Sir William Brereton	Sir Richard Grosvenor
1624	William Booth	William Brereton
1625	Sir Robert Cholmondeley, Bt	Sir Anthony St John
1626	Sir Richard Grosvenor, 1st Baronet	Peter Daniell
1628	Sir Richard Grosvenor, 1st Baronet	Sir William Brereton, 1st Baronet
April 1640	Sir Thomas Aston, 1st Baronet	Sir William Brereton, 1st Baronet
November 1640	Peter Venables	Sir William Brereton, 1st Baronet
1646	George Booth	Sir William Brereton, 1st Baronet
1653	Robert Duckenfield	Henry Birkenhead

- Four members returned to First Protectorate Parliament (1654)

Year	First member	Second member	Third member	Fourth member
1654	John Bradshaw	Sir George Booth, Bt	Henry Brooke	John Crew
1656	Richard Legh	Sir George Booth, Bt	Thomas Marbury	Peter Brooke

=== 1659–1832 ===
- Two members returned to Third Protectorate Parliament (1659)

Year	First member	First party	Second member	Second party
1659	John Bradshaw		Richard Legh	
1660	Sir George Booth, Bt		Sir Thomas Mainwaring, Bt	
1661	The Lord Brereton		Peter Venables	
1664	Sir Fulk Lucy		Peter Venables	
1670	Sir Fulk Lucy		Thomas Cholmondeley	
1678	Hon. Henry Booth	Whig	Thomas Cholmondeley	
February 1679	Hon. Henry Booth	Whig	Sir Philip Egerton	
September 1679	Hon. Henry Booth	Whig	Sir Robert Cotton, Bt	Whig
1685	Sir Philip Egerton		Thomas Cholmondeley	
1689	Sir Robert Cotton, Bt	Whig	Sir John Mainwaring, Bt	Whig
1702	Sir George Warburton, Bt	Tory	Sir Roger Mostyn, Bt	Tory
1705	Langham Booth	Whig	John Offley Crewe	Whig
1710	Sir George Warburton, Bt	Tory	Charles Cholmondeley	
1715	Sir George Warburton, Bt	Tory	Langham Booth	Whig
1722	Charles Cholmondeley		John Offley Crewe	Whig
1727	Charles Cholmondeley		Sir Robert Salusbury Cotton, Bt	
1734	Charles Cholmondeley		John Crewe	
1753	Charles Cholmondeley		Charles Crewe	
1754	Charles Cholmondeley		Samuel Egerton	
1756	Thomas Cholmondeley		Samuel Egerton	
1768	John Crewe	Whig	Samuel Egerton	
1780	John Crewe	Whig	Sir Robert Salusbury Cotton, Bt	
1796	John Crewe	Whig	Thomas Cholmondeley	
1802	William Egerton		Thomas Cholmondeley	
1806	Davies Davenport		Thomas Cholmondeley	
1812	Davies Davenport		Wilbraham Egerton	Tory
1830	Viscount Belgrave	Conservative	Wilbraham Egerton	Tory
1831	Viscount Belgrave	Conservative	George Wilbraham	Whig

- Constituency abolished (1832)

== See also ==
- List of former United Kingdom Parliament constituencies
- Unreformed House of Commons
- History of parliamentary constituencies and boundaries in Cheshire
