= Philip Egerton (died 1698) =

Sir Philip Egerton (1630 – 15 August 1698) was an English Tory landowner and member of parliament (MP) for Cheshire. He came from a distinguished lineage, with his family holding land in Cheshire since the 12th century. A branch of the family had also settled in Staffordshire and represented that county in Parliament as early as 1429, though Egerton’s grandfather was the first of the family to serve as MP for Cheshire. His mother was a committed Puritan, while his father lent £1,080 to the royalist cause in the early Civil War, although he remained amicable toward Parliament.

Upon his father’s death, Egerton inherited the Oulton estates, while his elder brother received family lands in Northamptonshire and Staffordshire. During the royalist uprising led by Sir George Booth in 1659, Egerton raised a troop of horse in support, and was knighted following the Restoration of Charles II.

Egerton was actively involved in suppressing dissent in the early years of Charles II’s reign. In 1670, he first stood for election in Cheshire as a country candidate, contesting Thomas Cholmondeley in a by-election. Though unsuccessful, he won a seat in the first general election of 1679. During his tenure, he did not make any speeches but was appointed to 15 committees, including those addressing security against Catholicism and the continued ban on importing Irish cattle. According to contemporary observer Roger Morrice, Egerton voted against the Exclusion Bill, to the disappointment of Shaftesbury and other Whigs. He may not have contested the election in September 1679, as he was succeeded by Robert Cotton.

Egerton regained his seat in 1685, and took an active role in James II's Parliament, serving on 11 committees. After the Rye House Plot, he was involved in searching homes of prominent local Whigs. Reappointed as deputy lieutenant in November 1688, he became a non-juror following the Glorious Revolution, refusing to swear allegiance to William and Mary. In 1690, he was imprisoned in Chester Castle on suspicion of Jacobite sympathies.

Egerton died on 15 August 1698, and was buried at Little Budworth. His family’s parliamentary legacy was not resumed until 1807, when John Egerton was elected to represent Chester.
