= Wilbraham Egerton (MP for Cheshire) =

British landowner and politician (1781–1856)

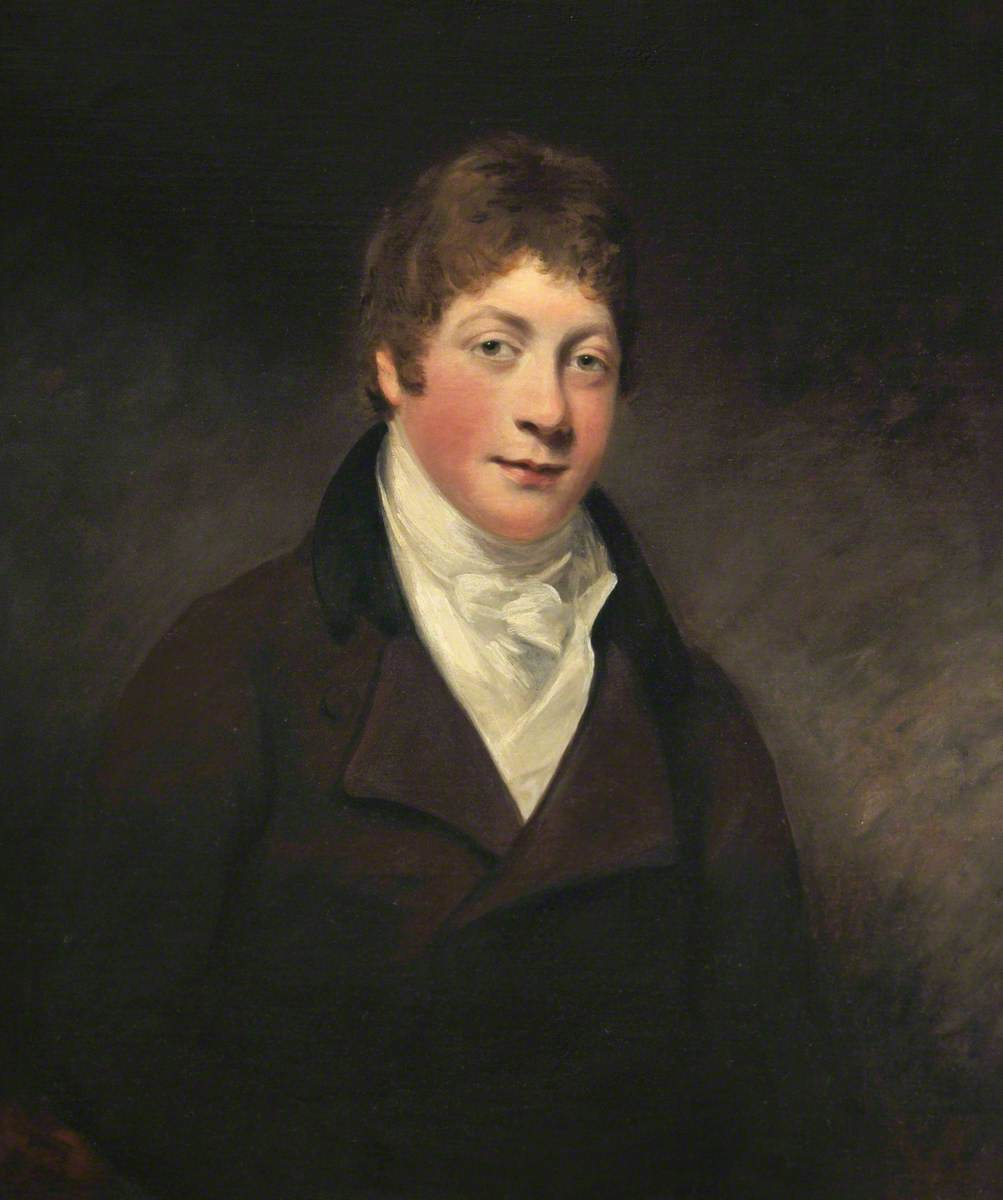
Photo of Wilbraham Egerton (MP for Cheshire)

Wilbraham Egerton (1 September 1781 – 25 April 1856) was a British landowner and Member of Parliament from the Egerton family.

He was the eldest surviving son of Mary Wilbraham Bootle and William Tatton, later Egerton and educated at Eton College (1796) and probably Brasenose College, Oxford (1800). In 1806, he succeeded his father, inheriting the large Tatton Hall estate in north Cheshire. He completed the large country house built by his father and furnished it with furniture from Gillows of Lancaster and London.

He was a Captain in the Royal Cheshire militia in 1803, lieutenant-colonel in the Macclesfield regiment in 1809 and captain (1831) and then lieutenant-colonel in the King's Cheshire yeomanry (1831).

He was appointed High Sheriff of Cheshire for 1808–09 and elected MP for Cheshire in 1812, sitting until 1831.

He married his cousin Elizabeth, the daughter of Sir Christopher Sykes, 2nd Baronet of Sledmere House, Yorkshire, with whom he had 7 sons and 3 daughters. Their eldest son and heir, William Tatton Egerton, became the 1st Baron Egerton. A younger son, Edward Egerton, was an MP for Macclesfield and Cheshire East. He died in 1856.
