= Richard Polwhele =

Cornish clergyman, poet and historian

- Born: 12 March 1760; Truro, Cornwall, England
- Died: 23 January 1838 (aged 78); Truro, Cornwall, England
- Occupation: Clergyman
- Known for: Historian and poet
- Spouses: Loveday Warren; Mary Tyrrell
- Children: 3
- Parent: Robert Blight

Richard Polwhele (6 January 1760 – 12 March 1838) was a Cornish clergyman, poet and historian of Cornwall and Devon.

== Biography ==
Richard Polwhele's ancestors long held the manor of Treworgan, 4 3/4 miles south-east of Truro in Cornwall, which family bore as arms: Sable, a saltire engrailed ermine. He was born at Truro, Cornwall, and met literary luminaries Catharine Macaulay and Hannah More at an early age. He was educated at Truro Grammar School, where he precociously published The Fate of Llewellyn. He went on to Christ Church, Oxford, continuing to write poetry, but left without taking a degree. In 1782 he was ordained a curate, married Loveday Warren, and moved to a curacy at Kenton, Devon. On his wife's death in 1793, Polwhele was left with three children. Later that year he married Mary Tyrrell, briefly taking up a curacy at Exmouth before being appointed to the small living of Manaccan in Cornwall in 1794. From 1806, when he took up a curacy at Kenwyn, Truro, he was non-resident at Manaccan: Polwhele angered Manaccan parishioners with his efforts to restore the church and vicarage. He maintained epistolary exchanges with Samuel Badcock, Macaulay, William Cowper, Erasmus Darwin, and Anna Seward.

When in Devon, Polwhele had edited the two-volume work Poems Chiefly by Gentlemen of Devonshire and Cornwall (1792) for an Exeter literary society. However, Essays by a Society of Gentlemen at Exeter (1796) caused a rift between Polwhele and other society members. Polwhele had by this time begun the first of his two major county histories, the History of Devonshire. This appeared in 3 volumes, 1793–1806, but his coverage was uneven and subscribers deserted. His seven-volume History of Cornwall appeared 1803–1808, with a new edition in 1816.

Polwhele's volumes of poetry included The Art of Eloquence, a didactic poem (1785), The Idylls, Epigrams, and Fragments of Theocritus, Bion, and Moschus, with the elegies of Tyrtaeus (1786), The English Orator (1796), Influence of Local Attachment (1796), and Poetic Trifles (1796). However, The Unsex'd Females, a Poem (1798), a defensive reaction to women's literary self-assertion, is today perhaps Polwhele's most notorious poetic production: in the poem Hannah More is Christ to Mary Wollstonecraft's Satan.

Polwhele contributed to the Gentleman's Magazine and (1799–1805) to the Anti-Jacobin Review. He published sermons, theological essays for the Church Union Society, and attacks on Methodism (although he befriended his main Methodist antagonist Samuel Drew). At the end of his life, after retiring to his manor house of Polwhele, he worked to produce Traditions and Recollections (two volumes, 1826) and Biographical Sketches (three volumes, 1831).

He died in Truro on 12 March 1838. He was buried at St Clement, Cornwall.

== Legacy ==
His name survives in Polwhele House School, an independent preparatory school two miles from Truro.

== Works ==
- Six Odes Presented to that Justly-Celebrated Historian, Mrs Catharine Macaulay, on her Birth-day, and Publicly Read to a Polite and Brilliant Audience, Assembled April the Second, at Alfred-House, Bath, to Congratulate that Lady on the Happy Occasion. Bath: R. Cruttwell. (1777)
- The Fate of Lewellyn; or, the Druid's Sacrifice. A Legendary Tale. In Two Parts. To which is added Carnbre', a Poem. Bath: Printed by R. Cruttwell, for the Author; and sold by E. and C. Dilly ... and W. Goldsmith [etc.]. (1777)
- The Spirit of Frazer, to General Burgoyne. An ode. To which is added, The Death of Hilda; an American Tale. Inscribed to Mrs. Macaulay. Bath: R. Cruttwell. (1778)
- The Art of Eloquence, a Didactic Poem (1785)
- The Follies of Oxford: Or, Cursory Sketches on a University Education, from an Under Graduate to his Friend in the Country. London: Dodsley, Dilly and Kearsley. (1785)
- The Idyllia, Epigrams, and Fragments, of Theocritus, Bion, and Moschus, with the Elegies of Tyrtæus, Translated from the Greek into English Verse. To which are Added, Dissertations and Notes. Exeter: R. Thorn. (1786)
- Poems. Namely, The English Orator; An Address to Thomas Pennant ... An Ode on the Susceptibility of the Poetical Character; Twenty Sonnets; An Epistle to a College Friend; and The Lock Transformed. With notes on The English Orator. London: T. Cadell. (1791)
- Poems, Chiefly by Gentlemen of Devonshire and Cornwall (1792)
- Historical Views of Devonshire (1793)
- The History of Devonshire, 3 vols., (1793–1806)
- Influence of Local Attachment (1796)
- Poetic Trifles (1796)
- Essays by a Society of Gentlemen at Exeter (1796), edited by Polwhele
- The Old English Gentleman (1797)
- The Unsex'd Females (1798)
- Grecian Prospects: A Poem, In Two Cantos. Helston: Cadell and Davis. (1799)
- A Sketch of Peter Pindar (1800)
- Anecdotes of Methodism (1800)
- Sir Aaron, or The Flights of Fanaticism (1800)
- History of Cornwall (3 vols., 1803)
- Poems. London: Rivington's. 1810.
- The Fair Isabel of Cotehele, a Cornish Romance, in six cantos. London: J. Cawthorn. (1815)
- Traditions and Recollections (2 vols, 1826)
- Biographical Sketches in Cornwall (3 vols, 1831)
- Reminiscences, in Prose and Verse; Consisting of the Epistolary Correspondence of Many Distinguished Characters. With Notes and Illustrations. London: J. B. Nichols and Son. (3 vols., 1836)

== Bibliography ==
- Courtney, William Prideaux (1887). "Polwhele, Richard" . In Stephen, Leslie (ed.). Dictionary of National Biography. Vol. 11. London: Smith, Elder & Co. pp. 71–73.
- Stafford, William (2002). English Feminists and Their Opponents in the 1790s: Unsex'd and Proper Females. Manchester University Press. ISBN 9780719060823.
