= Langham Booth =

English courtier and Member of Parliament

Member of Parliament for Liverpool
- In office 1723 - 12 May 1724

Member of Parliament for Cheshire
- In office 1705-1710; 1715-1722

Personal details
- Born: c. 1684
- Died: 12 May 1724 (aged 40)
- Party: Whig
- Parent: Henry Booth (father)
- Relatives: George Booth (brother); Henry Robartes (nephew); George Booth (grandfather)

Langham Booth (c. 1684 – 12 May 1724) was an English courtier and member of parliament.

A younger son of Henry Booth, 1st Earl of Warrington and his wife Mary Langham, in 1705 Booth was elected as a Whig as one of the two Members of Parliament for Cheshire and sat until 1710, in 1707 becoming one of the members of the First Parliament of Great Britain. He was elected again for the parliament of 1715 to 1722.

In 1723, Booth was returned as one of the members for Liverpool, but died only a year later, when he was reported to be aged forty.

He was also a Groom of the Bedchamber to King George I of Great Britain.
