= Fulk Lucy =

Sir Fulk Lucy (also spelled Fulke; c. 1623 – August 26, 1677) was an English politician who was MP for both Warwick and Cheshire from 16 May 1664 to 26 August 1677. He was the son of Sir Thomas Lucy.

== Biography ==
He served as a Member of the Cavalier Parliament (1661–1679), though he was relatively inactive and participated in only 35 parliamentary committees. On 21 December 1666, Lucy presented the estate bill of Henry Mildmay to the House of Lords.

In the autumn of 1667, he was appointed to committees tasked with examining shortcomings in the act restricting the import of Irish cattle and reviewing an additional bill on the matter. On 11 March 1670, he introduced a private bill for the settlement of the Leigh estate and, in December of that year, introduced the Weaver Navigation Bill. Lucy also participated in committees focused on improving observance of the Lord's Day (1671) and on measures to prevent abuses in parliamentary elections (1673).

Political strategists considered that Lucy's support might be influenced through Philip Meadows, a former Cromwellian diplomat who was distantly related to Lucy by marriage. However, Sir Joseph Williamson, an influential official, soon described Lucy as “very bitter against the lord treasurer.” He was subsequently managed by his partners in the Weaver Canal project, including the Lord Gerard of Brandon and Gilbert Gerard II.

Lucy died from fever on 26 August 1667, at the age of 54.
