= Thomas Cholmondeley (1627–1702) =

17th-century English politician

The Honourable Thomas Cholmondeley
- Arms of Cholmondeley: Gules, in chief two esquire's helmets argent in base a garb or

Member of Parliament for Cheshire
- In office 1670–1679
- In office 1685–1687

Personal details
- Born: 15 September 1627 Vale Royal, Cheshire
- Died: 26 February 1702 (aged 74) Vale Royal, Cheshire
- Resting place: Church Minshull, Cheshire
- Spouses: Jane Tollemache; Anne St, John
- Children: with Jane: Robert Cholmondeley; Thomas Cholmondeley; John Cholmondeley; Hugh Cholmondeley; Francis Cholmondeley; Elizabeth Cholmondeley; Catherine Cholmondeley; Jane Cholmondeley; Mary Cholmondeley; Unknown Cholmondeley; Anne Cholmondeley; Diana Cholmondeley; with Anne: Seymour Cholmondeley; John Cholmondeley; Charles Cholmondeley; Joanna Cholmondeley
- Parents: Thomas Cholmondeley; Elizabeth Minshull

Thomas Cholmondeley (15 September 1627 – 26 February 1702), of Vale Royal, Cheshire was an English landowner and politician who sat in the House of Commons between 1670 and 1687. He was elected MP for Cheshire in 1670 and 1685 and was Sheriff of Cheshire from 1660 to 1661.

== Biography ==
Cholmondeley was born on 15 September 1627, the third son of Thomas Cholmondeley (1595 – 1653) of Vale Royal, Cheshire and Elizabeth Minshull, daughter of John Minshull of Minshull and Frances Egerton of Oulton.

He married, firstly, Jane Tollemache (d. 18 April 1666), daughter of Sir Lionel Tollemache, 2nd Baronet of Helmingham Hall in Suffolk and Elizabeth Stanhope, daughter of John Stanhope, 1st Baron Stanhope of Harrington, by whom he had six sons and seven daughters:

- Robert Cholmondeley
- Thomas Cholmondeley
- John Cholmondeley
- Hugh Cholmondeley
- Francis Cholmondeley
- Elizabeth Cholmondeley
- Catherine Cholmondeley
- Jane Cholmondeley
- Mary Cholmondeley
- Unknown Cholmondeley
- Anne Cholmondeley
- Diana Cholmondeley

He married, secondly, Anne St. John, daughter of Sir Walter St John, 3rd Baronet of Lydiard Tregoze, Wiltshire, by whom he had three sons and a daughter:

- Seymour Cholmondeley
- John Cholmondeley
- Charles Cholmondeley (1685 – 1756) married Essex Pitt, daughter of Thomas Pitt of Stratford, Wiltshire.
- Joanna Cholmondeley

He died on 26 February 1702 at Vale Royal and was buried on 2 March at Church Minshull, Cheshire. "Had he not lived in times of difficulties and divisions", wrote his Whig neighbour, "he had been the most popular commoner at home and abroad."

== Sources ==
- Hampson, Gillian; Henning, Basil Duke (1983). "Cholmondeley, Thomas (1627-1702), of Vale Royal, Cheshire". In Henning, Basil Duke (ed.). The History of Parliament: the House of Commons 1660-1690. Archived from the original on 18 November 2024 – via History of Parliament Online.
- Ormerod, George; Helsby, Thomas (1882). The History of the County Palatine and City of Chester: Compiled from Original Evidences in Public Offices the Harleian and Cottonian Mss. Parochial Registers Private Muniments Unpublished Ms. Collections of Successive Cheshire Antiquaries and a Personal Survey of Every Township in the County; Incorporated with a Republication of King's Hale Royal and Leycester's Cheshire Antiquities. Vol. 2 (2nd ed.). George Routledge and Sons. OCLC 223243317.
