= Brerewood =

Brerewood is a surname. Notable people with the surname include:

- Robert Brerewood (1588–1654), English lawyer and politician
- Thomas Brerewood (c. 1670–1746)
- Edward Brerewood (c. 1565–1613), English scholar and antiquary
- Francis Brerewood (1694–1781), English painter, translator, and architect
