= Byfield =

Byfield may refer to:

== Places ==
- Byfield, Massachusetts, USA
- Byfield, Northamptonshire, England
- Byfield, Queensland, Australia
- Byfield National Park, Queensland, Australia
- Byfield Historic District

== People ==
- Adoniram Byfield (died 1660), English clergyman
- Allan George Richard Byfield (1913–1990), Jamaican politician
- Althea Byfield (born 1982), Jamaican basketball and netball player
- Arnold Byfield (1923–2015), Australian cricketer and footballer
- Barbara Ninde Byfield (1930–1988), American author and illustrator
- Bruce Byfield (born 1958), Canadian journalist
- Darren Byfield (born 1976), British footballer
- Debbie Byfield (born 1954), Jamaican sprinter
- Ernie Byfield (1889–1950), American hotelier and restaurateur
- Link Byfield (1951–2015), Canadian news columnist
- Mary Byfield (1795–1871), English artist
- Nicholas Byfield (1579–1622), English clergyman
- Quinton Byfield (born 2002), Canadian ice hockey player
- Richard Byfield (c.1598–1664), English clergyman
- Shadrack Byfield (1789–1874), British soldier and author
- Ted Byfield (1928–2021), Canadian journalist
- Zig Byfield (1943–2017), British actor
