= Francis Brerewood =

English painter

- Born: Francis Brerewood; 1694; Chester, England
- Died: 1781 (aged 86–87); London
- Known for: Painter
- Notable work: Benedict Leonard Calvert
- Patrons: Benedict Calvert, 4th Baron Baltimore

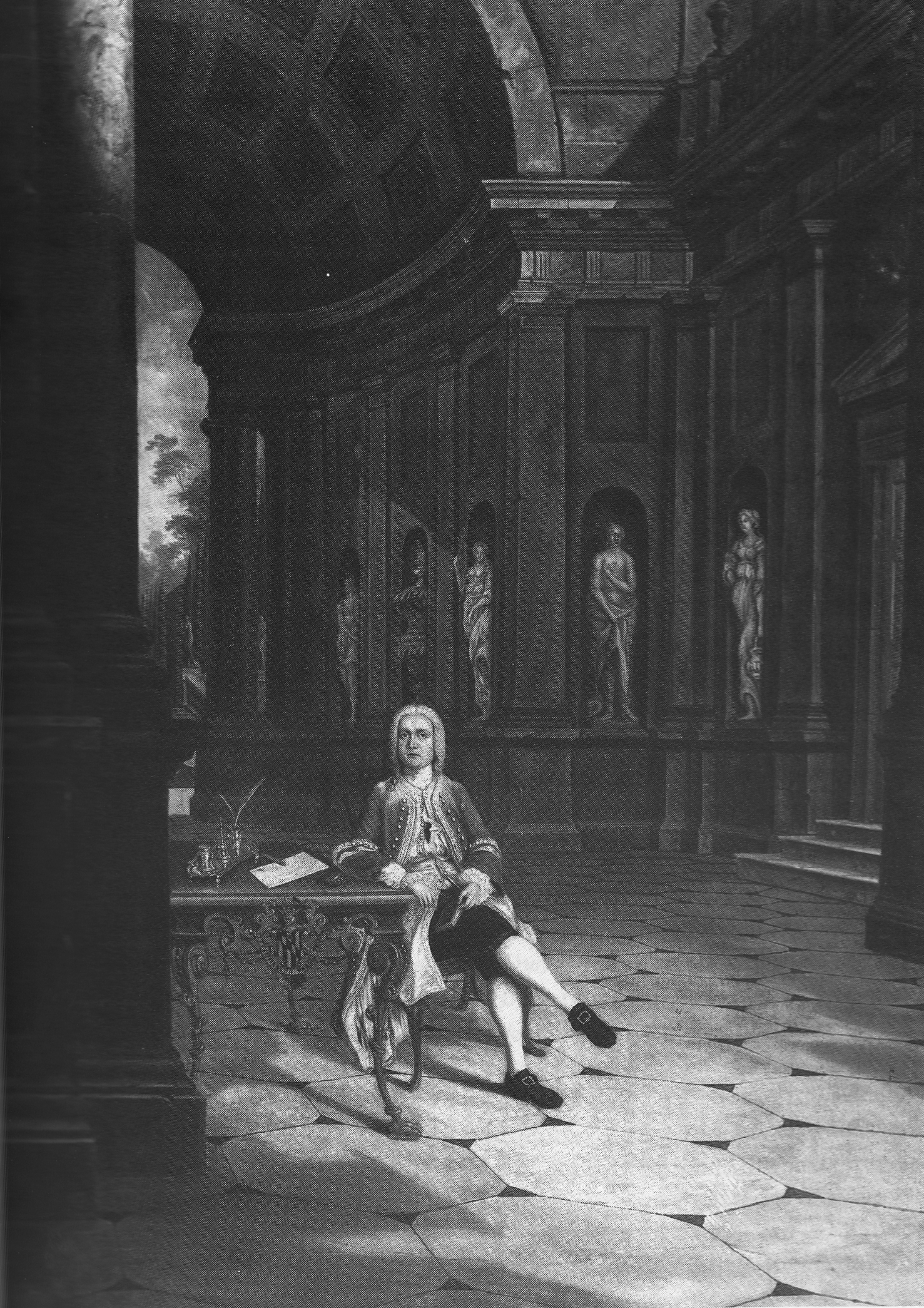
Benedict Leonard Calvert painted by Francis Brerewood at the Calvert home of Woodcote Park, Surrey, c. 1726.

Francis Brerewood (1694-1781) was an English painter, translator and architect. He enjoyed the patronage of Benedict Calvert, 4th Baron Baltimore, painting portraits of Lord Baltimore's son Benedict, and decorating the apartments of the Calvert family seat at Woodcote Park. He became embroiled in unsuccessful litigation in 1746 following his father's death, and he died in poverty in 1781.

== Early life ==
Brerewood was born in Chester, the son of Thomas Brerewood (c. 1670 - 22 December 1746), and the great-grandson of Sir Robert Brerewood, a wealthy landowner whose rents at the time of his death amounted to some £8,000 a year, an enormous sum at the time.

By the time Francis was born, the family fortunes were somewhat diminished. His father Thomas Brerewood was a business entrepreneur and fraudster who was involved in the notorious Pitkin Affair of 1705. Along with his partner Thomas Pitkin, Thomas Brerewood plotted a bankruptcy fraud that, when discovered, was only eclipsed by the later financial disaster of the South Sea Bubble in 1720. Unravelling the scam required three large insolvencies and four acts of Parliament over the course of more than forty years. Despite this, Thomas Brerewood was pardoned in 1709, and he was thus permitted to rebuild his fortunes, which he seems to have done with some success.

Like his older brother Thomas, Francis received a gentleman's education. In 1716 his sister Henrietta was married to the theatre impresario John Rich, known as the originator of English pantomime. In the same year Thomas, then in his early twenties, made a highly advantageous marriage to Charlotte Calvert, the fourteen-year-old daughter of the fourth Lord Baltimore, Benedict Calvert, 4th Baron Baltimore. The marriage may not have been sanctioned by her family, for the couple had a clandestine wedding in the Fleet Prison - a so-called "fleet marriage" - which was not publicly announced until February of the following year.

== Career ==
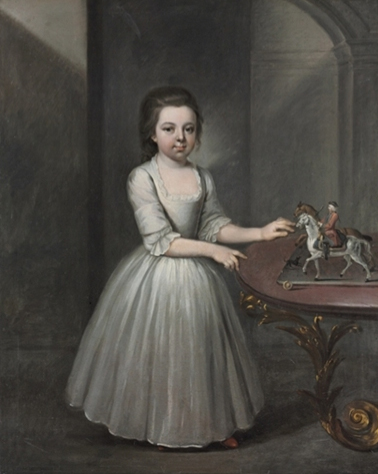
Painting of a young girl, attributed to Brerewood.

Francis and Thomas both went into the arts. Thomas is remembered as a minor poet; Francis, as a minor artist and architect. Both sons patronized the composer George Frideric Handel; Thomas Jr. even translated his aria "Son Confusa Pastorella" into English.

Francis Brerewood benefited from the patronage of the Calvert family, and painted a number of portraits of British aristocrats including that of Benedict Leonard Calvert, the younger son of Benedict Calvert, 4th Baron Baltimore., which hangs in the Baltimore Museum of Art. He also had a hand in decorating the apartments at the Calvert family seat of Woodcote Park, Surrey.

Francis evidently was a skilled linguist. In 1716 he translated a work by Abbe Jean Terrasson, A Discourse on Ancient and Modern Learning, into English. Later, he translated A Critical Dissertation on Homer's Iliad by the same author, publishing the result in two volumes from 1723 to 1725.

Neither Francis nor his brother proved adept at managing their financial affairs, and by 1728 Thomas Jr. was in financial difficulty. Fortunately, in July 1731 Thomas's wife Charlotte inherited 10,000 acres in northern Maryland known as My Lady's Manor. The following month, the couple deeded the land to the elder Thomas Brerewood in order that he might pay off Thomas Jr.’s creditors, of whom the senior Brerewood was likely the largest. The latter sailed to Maryland, by now in his sixties, where he became a successful land manager, and founded a short-lived town called Charlotte Town on the site of present day Monkton, Maryland. Completing his resurrection as a man of importance, in 1741, the elder Thomas Brerewood became clerk of Baltimore County, a well-remunerated position he held until his death on 22 December 1746.

== Inheritance ==
Upon his death of his father in 1746, Francis found himself embroiled in litigation with his half-sister over his father's estate, which had been entailed in the male line. The story was recounted by the author and historian James Gill in 1852:

"Francis, the second son of Thomas Brerewood, was now involved in lawsuits in quest of his rights, and that he had right on his side, and the magic of being in the right, is evinced by the statements made in courts of law, and the answers received by the best legal judgments:- but equity failed him, and by destiny he was wedded to calamity, like others who had been in fortune's high lap fed....he it was who was forced from home and all its pleasures, to lodge for fifteen years obscurely in The Strand, and was beset by carking care and biting penury."

In 1791 The Gentleman's Magazine published an account of the family's fortune, and of the straitened circumstances in which Brerewood found himself, quoting the following piece of doggerel verse:

Nor Blackstone any pleasure brings;
his rights of persons and of things,
would make us beggars were we kings

== Death ==
Francis Brerewood died penurious in 1781, having lived in serious financial straits for at least thirty years. In his will, dated 7 July 1781, in which he styled himself as being "of St George The Martyr, London", he left what remained of his possessions to his widow Mary.

== Legacy ==
Woodcote Park was gutted by fire in 1934, but some of Brerewood's work remains. A painting attributed him, titled Portrait of a Young Girl, was listed for sale by Christie's, South Kensington, London in September 2009.
