= Gamull =

Gamull is a surname. Notable people with the surname include:

- Francis Gamull (1606–1654), English politician
- Gamull Baronets
