= Poison ring =

Ring with concealed compartment which could be used to store poison

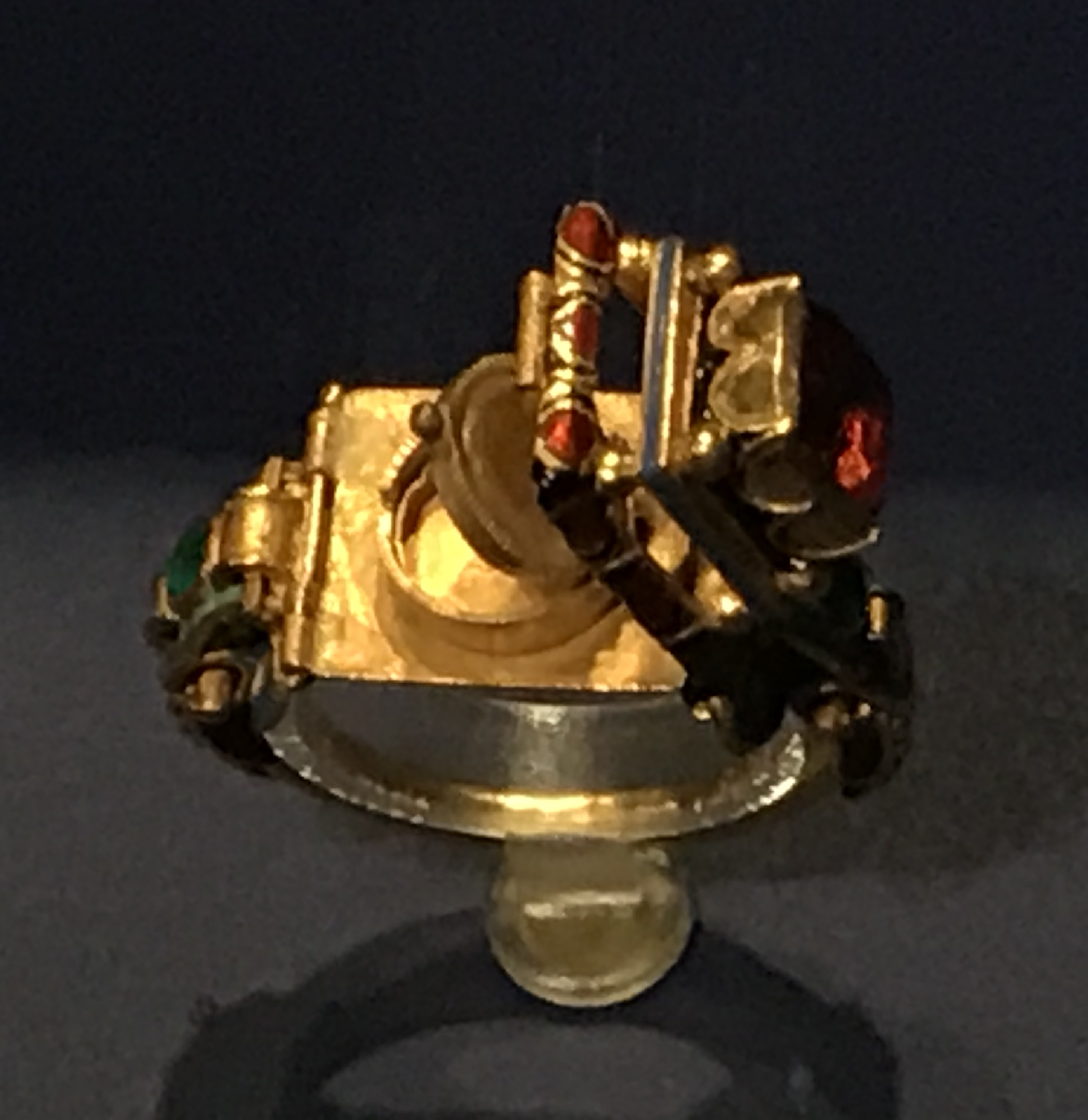
Poison ring

A poison ring or pillbox ring is a type of ring with a container under the bezel or inside the bezel itself which could be used to hold poison or another substance; they became popular in Western Europe during the Middle Ages. The poison ring was used to slip poison into an enemy's food or drink. A powder or liquid poison was stored in these instances. In other cases, the poison ring was used to facilitate the suicide of the wearer in order to preclude capture or torture. People more commonly died from suicide rather than murder caused by the poison ring. The purpose of the compartment in the ring was not only limited to poison. Rings with such compartments were long before used for other reasons, before, during, and after the peak of poison rings.

== Other names and uses ==
There were many uses for such rings. A very popular use for these rings was to store perfume, special items, talismans, keepsakes or small portraits. People would even store the teeth, hair, and bones of the dead, especially of saints or martyrs, because it was believed to protect and cast away misfortune. It was even thought to create and bond with God through it. Carrying holy relics was believed to bring happiness and good health, and to be in the good graces of God. These rings were also known as locket, socket, compartment, box, and funeral rings.

== The difficulties of using the poison ring ==
The compartment in poison rings are relatively small. A strong potent poison was needed to be able to end a person's life. Carrying things in rings was common, but the science of making a deadly poison that could kill someone from just a drop was challenging for most. Seeing that it was no easy task of creating such a lethal death through such a small amount of poison, it is speculated that there were probably few deaths from the poison rings.

== Known victims ==
Carthaginian General Hannibal committed suicide in order to avoid capture by Roman soldiers. Another victim of the poison ring was Marquis de Condorcet. He ended his life in a desperate attempt to avoid a far worse death.

== The story of Lucrezia Borgia ==
Lucrezia Borgia was an Italian noblewoman who according to legend was exceptionally talented at making poisons potent, enough to use the poison ring to dispose of political rivals. The story of Lucrezia Borgia was only speculated but has never been confirmed.

== The origin of poison rings ==
According to Marcy Waldie, who wrote about poison rings in the October 2001 article "A Ring to Die For: Poison Rings Hold Centuries of Secrets", published in Antiques & Collecting Magazine, this type of jewelry originated in ancient days of the Far East and India. It replaced the practice of wearing keepsakes and other items in pouches around the neck. The wearing of vessel rings was so practical that it spread to other parts of Asia, the Middle East and the Mediterranean before reaching Western Europe in the Middle Ages. By then the rings were part of the "holy relic trade."

== In culture ==
- In Asterix in Switzerland, the corrupt governor Varius Flavus uses one to poison the quaestor investigating him.
- Used by "-A" to drug Character Aria Montgomery on Freeform television series Pretty Little Liars.
- A poison ring with a hidden Cross of Lorraine appears in the film Casablanca.
- In Verdi's opera Il trovatore, Lady Leonora commits suicide by ingesting poison from her poison ring, so she can remain faithful to her lover.
- In Puccini's opera "Tosca", the rebel Angelotti commits suicide with the use of a poison ring so as not to be captured and tortured.
- In the TV series Forever Knight, vampire Lucien Lacroix wears a poison ring on the little finger of his right hand in most scenes set in the 20th century.
- In the children's book The Haunted Spy by Barbara Ninde Byfield, the 400-year-old ghost-knight Sir Roger de Rudisell has a poison ring, which the story's narrator displays in his home as a treasured memento of the knight.
- Kenneth Parcel uses one in an episode of 30 Rock.
- Sophie Ellis-Bextor used a poison ring in the music video for her song "Murder on the Dancefloor".
- Used by Lady Gaga's character in the music video for "Paparazzi".
- Used by Jingweon Mafia members in Yakuza 2 to not reveal secrets.

== Works cited ==
- Gannon, Megan. “Is This a Murder Weapon? Medieval Poison Ring Uncovered in Bulgaria.” NBCNews.Com, 22 Aug. 2013, www.nbcnews.com/sciencemain/murder-weapon-medieval-poison-ring-uncovered-bulgaria-6c10981027
- Gia. “The Murky History of Poison Rings.” GIA 4Cs, 24 Jan. 2017, 4cs.gia.edu/en-us/blog/murky-history-poison-rings/
- Higgs, Levi. “The Wild History of Poison Rings.” The Daily Beast, 14 Oct. 2018, www.thedailybeast.com/the-wild-history-of-poison-rings.
- “Ring.” Edited by Amy Tikkanen, Encyclopædia Britannica, 20 July 1998, www.britannica.com/art/ring-jewelry
- Waldie, Marcy. "A Ring to Die For: Poison Rings Hold Centuries of Secrets", 1 Oct. 2001, pp. 60–65. EBSCO Host, https://web-p-ebscohost-com.eznvcc.vccs.edu/ehost/pdfviewer/pdfviewer?vid=0&sid=2085a790-08b7-48b6-87d9-bce95f8d8989%40redis. Accessed 1 Aug. 2023.
