= Leland Historic District (Leland, Michigan) =

Historic district in Michigan, United States

- U.S. National Register of Historic Places
- U.S. Historic district
- Michigan State Historic Site
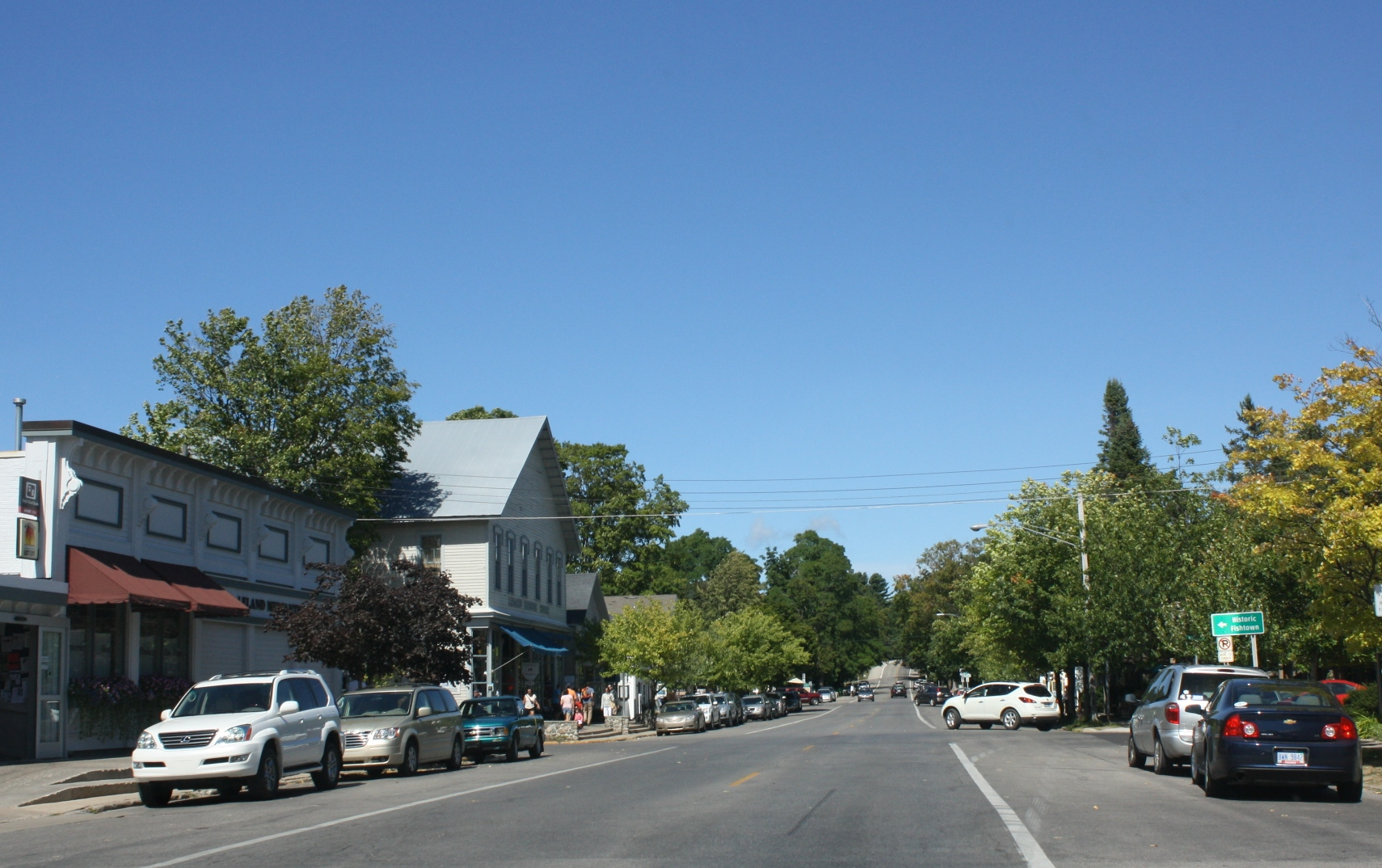
- Downtown Leland

- Location within Michigan Location within the United States
- Interactive map
- Location: Roughly bounded by the park, Main St., Ave. A, and the harbor, Leland, Michigan
- Coordinates: 45°1′24″N 85°45′40″W
- Area: 9 acres (3.6 ha)
- NRHP reference No.: 75000951

Significant dates
- Added to NRHP: November 20, 1975
- Designated MSHS: June 28, 1973

- Fishtown Historic District
- U.S. National Register of Historic Places
- U.S. Historic district
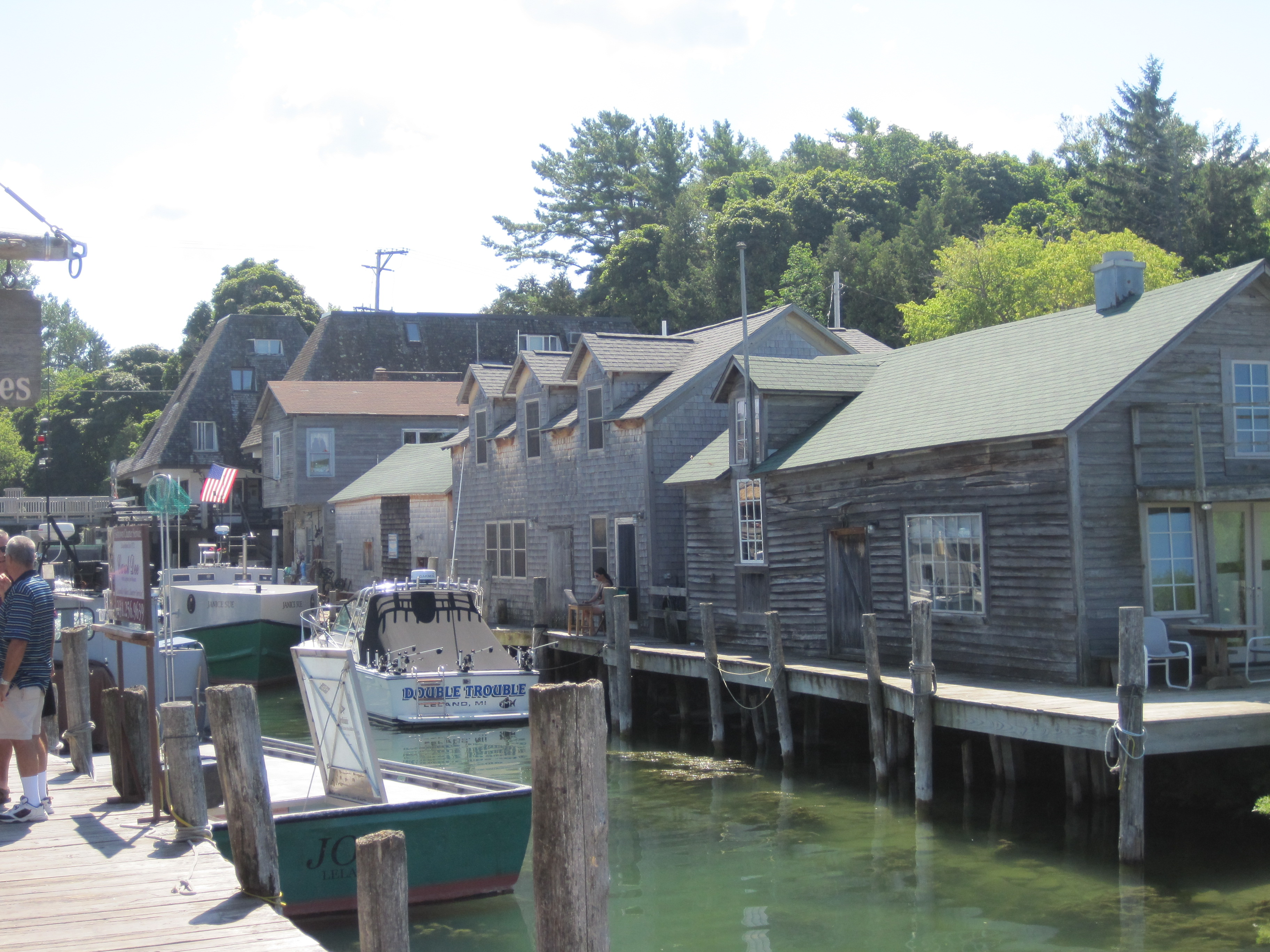
- Fishtown
- Location: Roughly bounded by West River St., West Cedar St., and West Avenue A, Leland, Michigan
- Area: 1.86 acres (0.75 ha)
- NRHP reference No.: 100006765
- Added to NRHP: January 11, 2022

The Leland Historic District is a historic district roughly bounded by the park, Main Street, Avenue A, and the harbor, in Leland, Michigan. It was designated a Michigan State Historic Site in 1973 and listed on the National Register of Historic Places in 1975. The district consists of two contiguous areas: Leland's downtown and the nearby commercial fishing area colloquially known as Fishtown. The Fishtown area was listed separately on the National Register in 2022.

== History ==
In 1853, Leland pioneer Antoine Manseau constructed a dam across the Carp River at this location. Manseau built a sawmill and docks, setting up Leland as a wooding station for steamers. By 1867, 200 people had settled in Leland. The area also began to develop a fishing fleet, with commercial increasing in importance from the 1870s through the 1890s. More development followed, and in 1886 the county seat was moved to Leland.

In the early 1900s, fishermen began enclosing their open boats and adding gasoline engines, which increased the scale of fishing operations. By 1937, two breakwaters were constructed in the waters of Lake Michigan, which also facilitated the rise of the local fishing industry. However, in the 1940s, the whitefish and trout populations in the lake were decimated by sea lampreys. Although commercial fishing operations continued, the area relied more heavily on tourism and charter operations. In the 21st century, the harbor area contains a mix of commercial fishing and tourist operations.

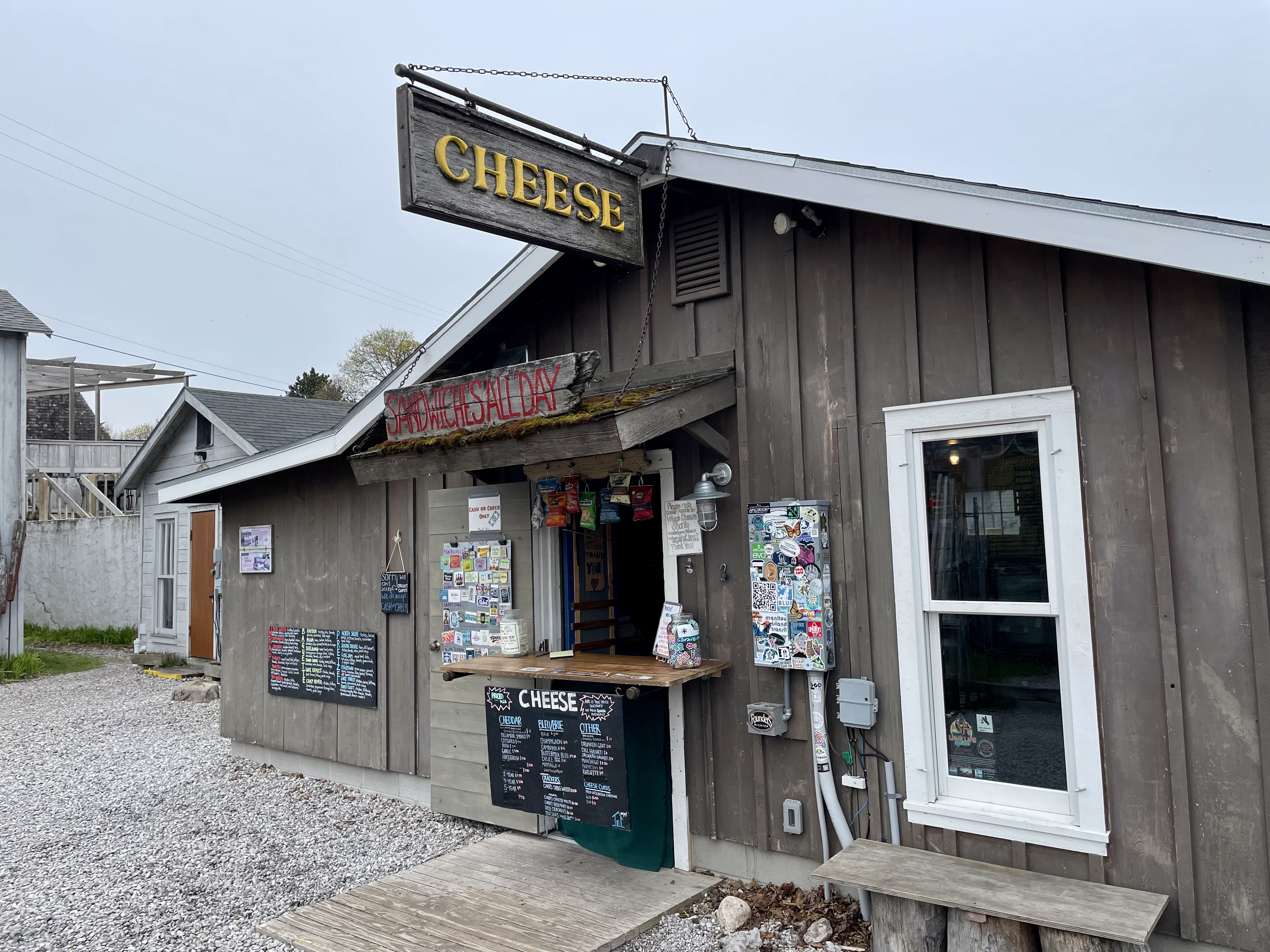
Village Cheese shanty in 2023

Beginning in 2019 and intensifying in 2020, many of the historic shanties have become inundated with water on a regular basis due to record high waters in Lake Michigan and increased flow from the Carp river. The owner of the site, Fishtown Preservation, is raising funds to raise, repair, and stabilize the shanties and preserve current and future fishing operations. The first shanty to be moved, on January 10, 2020, was the Village Cheese shanty, with the Morris Shanty scheduled to be raised in the winter of 2020–21.

== Description ==
The Leland Historic District, containing both commercial and residential structures, is located at the mouth of the Carp River. It encompasses one of Michigan's most scenic villages; the structures in the district are substantially original, with few alterations. The district includes Leland's commercial area, containing historic buildings, the fishing shanties, smokehouses, and docks in the outlet of the river.

The commercial area of the district contain a series of relatively plain commercial buildings, many with Gothic Revival detailing. The most prominent of these is the two-story Harbor House, whose first story is a commercial space and the second had been a meeting hall. It has recessed doorways and six over six windows under Italianate window hoods on the second floor. Also included in the district is the Hendrickson Cottage, the oldest known building in Leland. It is a one and a half story frame cottage.

The fishing section of the district, known as Fishtown, is also separately listed on the Register. It consists of structures lining both sides of the Leland River. These include vernacular wood-clad former and current commercial fishery buildings, most of which were constructed by the fishermen before 1930. Additionally, the district includes wood-frame vernacular buildings which are part of the historic Manitou Island ferry service. The district also has docks for Fishtown's commercial fishing vessels, Joy and Janice Sue, along with charter boats, private recreational vessels, and the Mishe-Mokwa ferry.
