= Leland, Michigan =

- Census-designated place (CDP) & unincorporated community
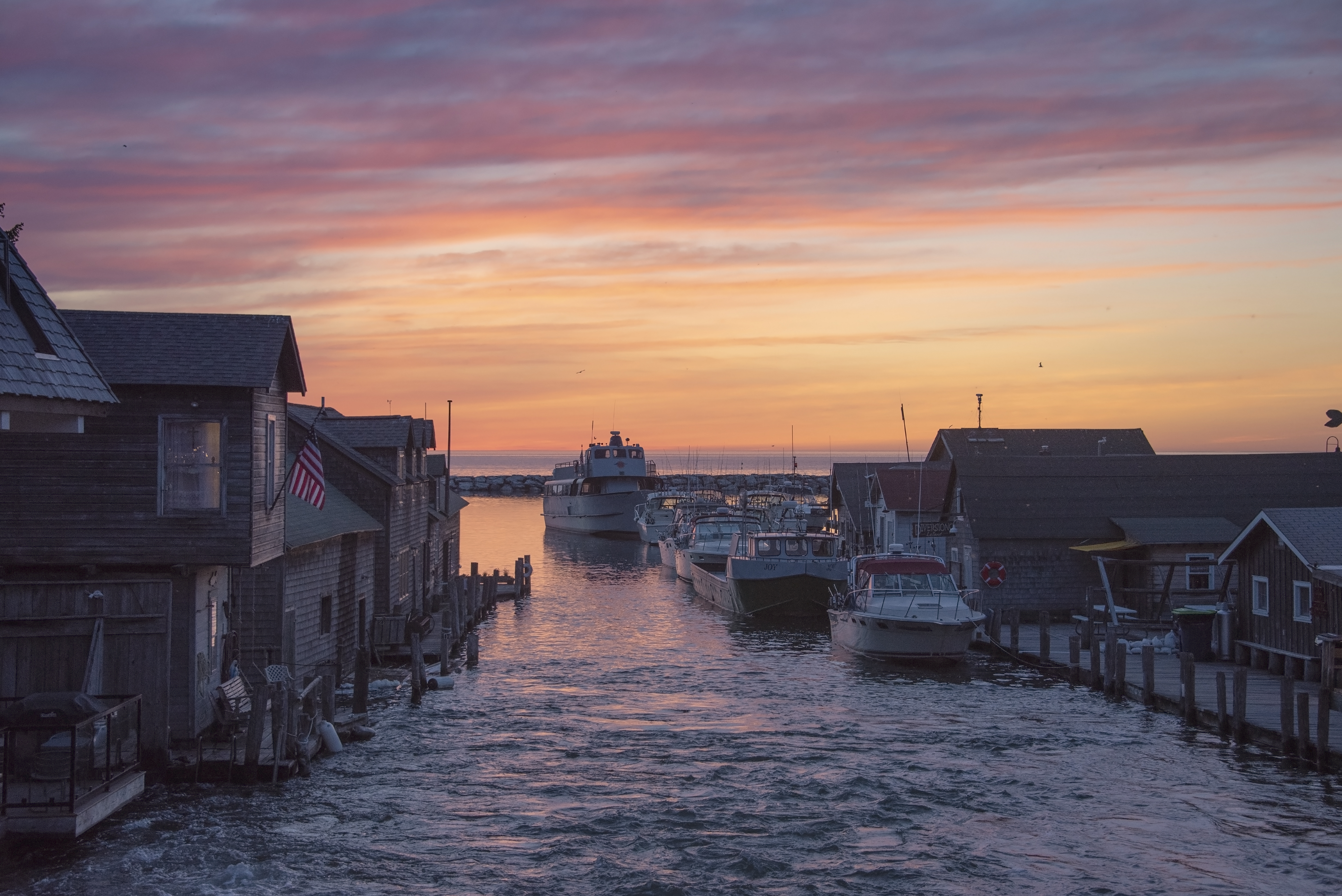
- Historic Fishtown along the Leland River
- Nickname: Fishtown
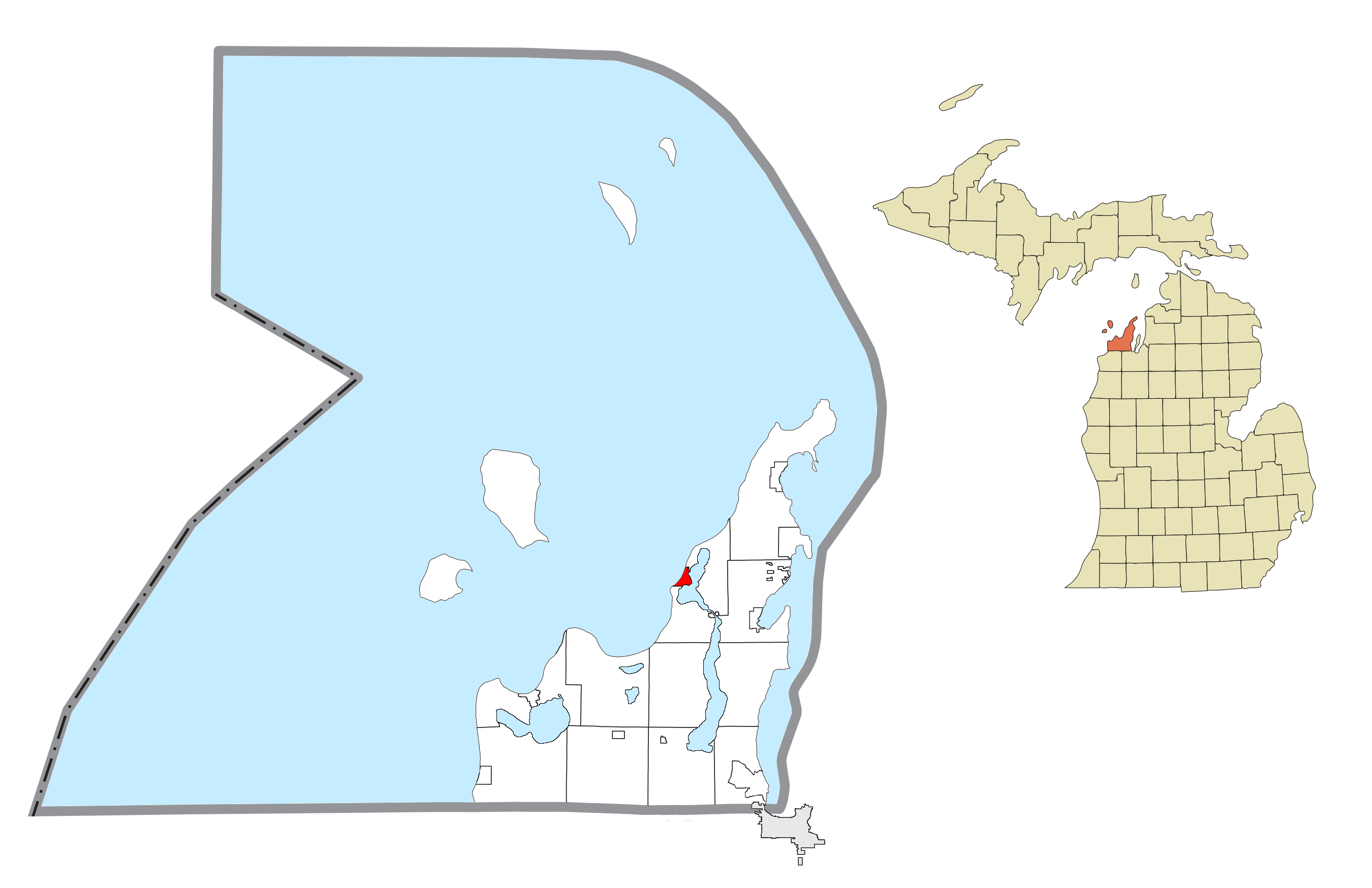
- Location within Leelanau County

- Location within the state of Michigan Location within the United States
- Coordinates: 45°01′28″N 85°45′45″W
- Country: United States
- State: Michigan
- County: Leelanau
- Township: Leland
- Settled: 1853

Area
  - Total: 1.00 sq mi (2.58 km^{2})
  - Land: 0.98 sq mi (2.53 km^{2})
  - Water: 0.023 sq mi (0.06 km^{2})
- Elevation: 581 ft (177 m)

Population (2020)
  - Total: 410
  - Density: 420.3/sq mi (162.26/km^{2})
- ZIP code(s): 49654
- Area code: 231
- FIPS code: 26-46800

Leland (/ˈliːlənd/ LEE-lənd) is an unincorporated community and census-designated place (CDP) in the U.S. state of Michigan. It is located in Leelanau County, part of the northwestern Lower Peninsula of the state. As of the 2020 census it had a population of 410. From 1883 to 2004, Leland was the county seat of Leelanau County, which has since moved to Suttons Bay Township.

Part of Leland Township, Leland is situated on an isthmus between Lake Leelanau and Lake Michigan, and is bisected by the Leland River, flowing from the former to the latter. Leland is a significant tourism destination and summer colony, and is located nearby Sleeping Bear Dunes National Lakeshore. Leland also serves as the departure point for ferry service to North and South Manitou Islands, both of which are wholly included in the National Lakeshore.

== History ==
Leland is built on the site of one of the oldest and largest Ottawa villages on the Leelanau Peninsula. Where the Leland (Carp) River flows into Lake Michigan, there was a natural fish ladder (which was a traditional Native American fishing grounds). The settlement was called Mishi-me-go-bing, meaning "the place where canoes run up into the river to land, because they have no harbor", or alternatively Che-ma-go-bing or Chi-mak-a-ping.

White settlers, who began arriving in the 1830s, also took advantage of the location as a fishing settlement. White settlement increased after Antoine Manseau, with his son Antoine Jr., and John Miller, built a dam and sawmill on the river in 1854. Construction of the dam raised the water level 12 feet (3.7 m), and what had been three natural lakes in the river all became a single lake now known as Lake Leelanau (and is navigable all the way to the community of Cedar, about 13 miles (21 km) inland). The settlers built wooden docks, which allowed steamers and schooners to transport new settlers and supplies.

From 1870 to 1884, the Leland Lake Superior Iron Co. operated an iron smelter north of the river mouth, supplied with ore from the Upper Peninsula and charcoal made from local maple and beech timber; the charcoal was produced in fourteen beehive kilns near the smelting furnace, which produced up to 40 tons of iron per day. In 1884, the plant was sold to the Leland Lumber Co., which operated a sawmill on the site. Other sawmills and shingle mills operated in Leland during the years 1885–1900.

As early as 1880, commercial fishermen sailed out of the harbor to catch trout and whitefish, building wooden shacks where they processed their catch and serviced their fleet. Up to eight powered tugs once sailed out of "Fishtown", as the buildings came to be known. Today, the historic fishing settlement and two fish tugs, Joy and Janice Sue, are owned by a non-profit organization, the Fishtown Preservation Society. Fishtown is home to a working fishery and a thriving charter fishing business. The riverfront is lined by a boardwalk and quaint shacks that have been converted into tourist shops.

Around 1900, wealthy individuals from Chicago, Detroit, and other Midwestern industrial centers began to visit Leland and build summer cottages, arriving by Lake Michigan passenger steamer or by Lake Leelanau steamer from the railhead near Traverse City. This led to the construction of resort hotels, and the growth of Leland as a summer resort town.

== Geography ==
Leland is in northern Leelanau County, on the west side of the Leelanau Peninsula. It is bordered to the west by Lake Michigan and to the east by the northern section of Lake Leelanau. The Leland River runs through the center of the community, connecting the two lakes. According to the U.S. Census Bureau, the Leland CDP has a total area of 1.00 square mile (2.58 km^{2}), of which 0.98 square miles (2.53 km^{2}) are land and 0.02 square miles (0.06 km^{2}), or 2.22%, are water.

Leland lies just north of the 45th parallel. A sign on M-22 south of Leland reads "45th Parallel Halfway Between Equator & North Pole".

== Demographics ==
Historical population
Census	Pop.	Note	%±
2010	377		—
2020	410		8.8%
U.S. Decennial Census

== Transportation ==
- M-22, the only road connecting Leland to the rest of the county. It leads northeast 11 miles (18 km) to Northport and southwest 18 miles (29 km) to Glen Arbor.
- Manitou Island Transit, ferry service to North and South Manitou Island

== Cultural institutions ==
- Leelanau Historical Society and Museum, 203 East Cedar Street
- Leland Township Library, 203 East Cedar Street

== Michigan historical sites ==
- Walter Best Women's Club (Old Art Building), 1125 Main Street
- Riverside Inn, 302 East River Street
- Leelanau County Jail, 106 Chandler Street
- Leland Historic District (Fishtown)
- Greycote Cottage, 110 Pearl Street
- W. K. Hatt Cottage, 410 North Main Street

== Gallery ==
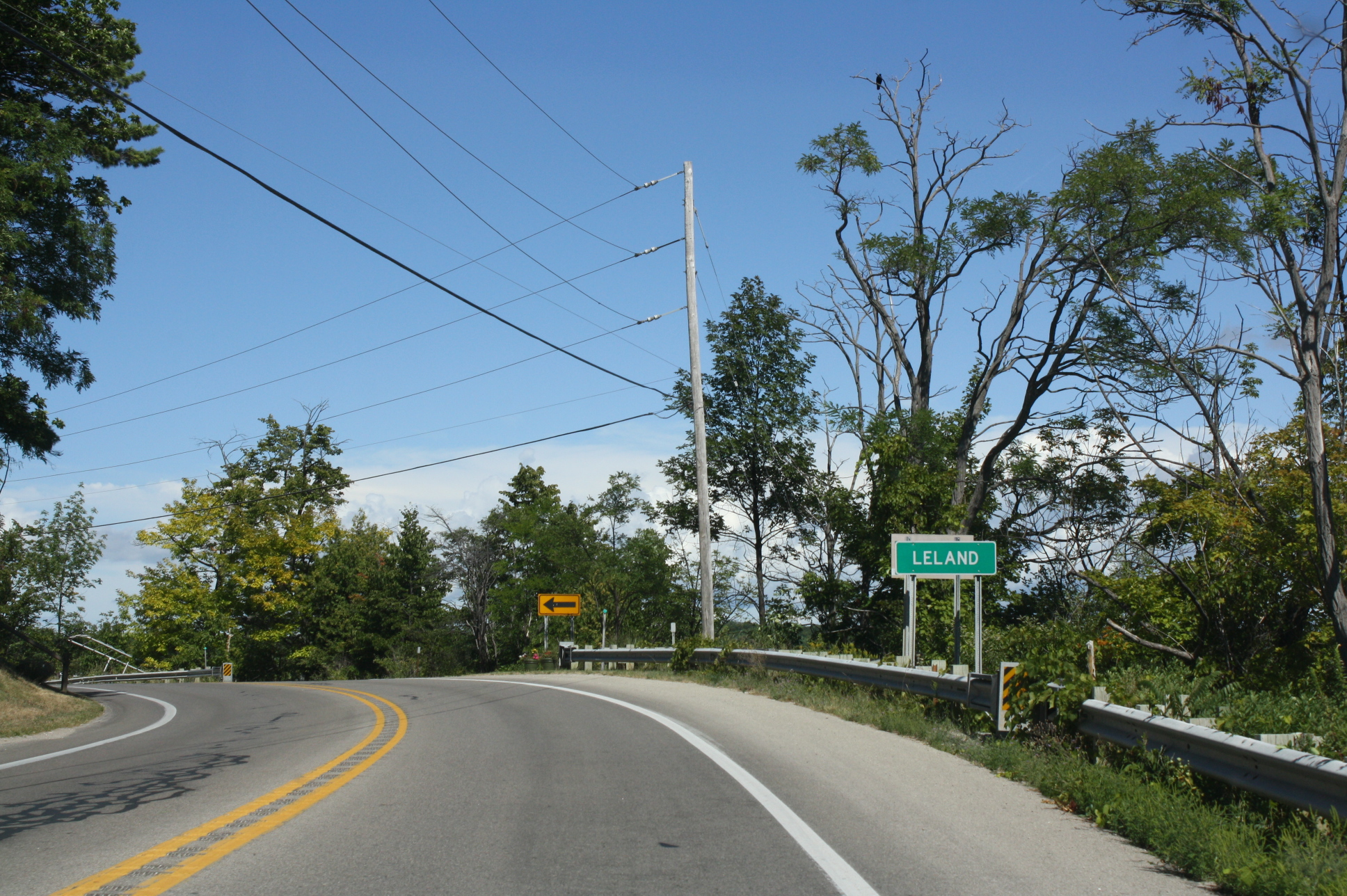
Sign on M-22

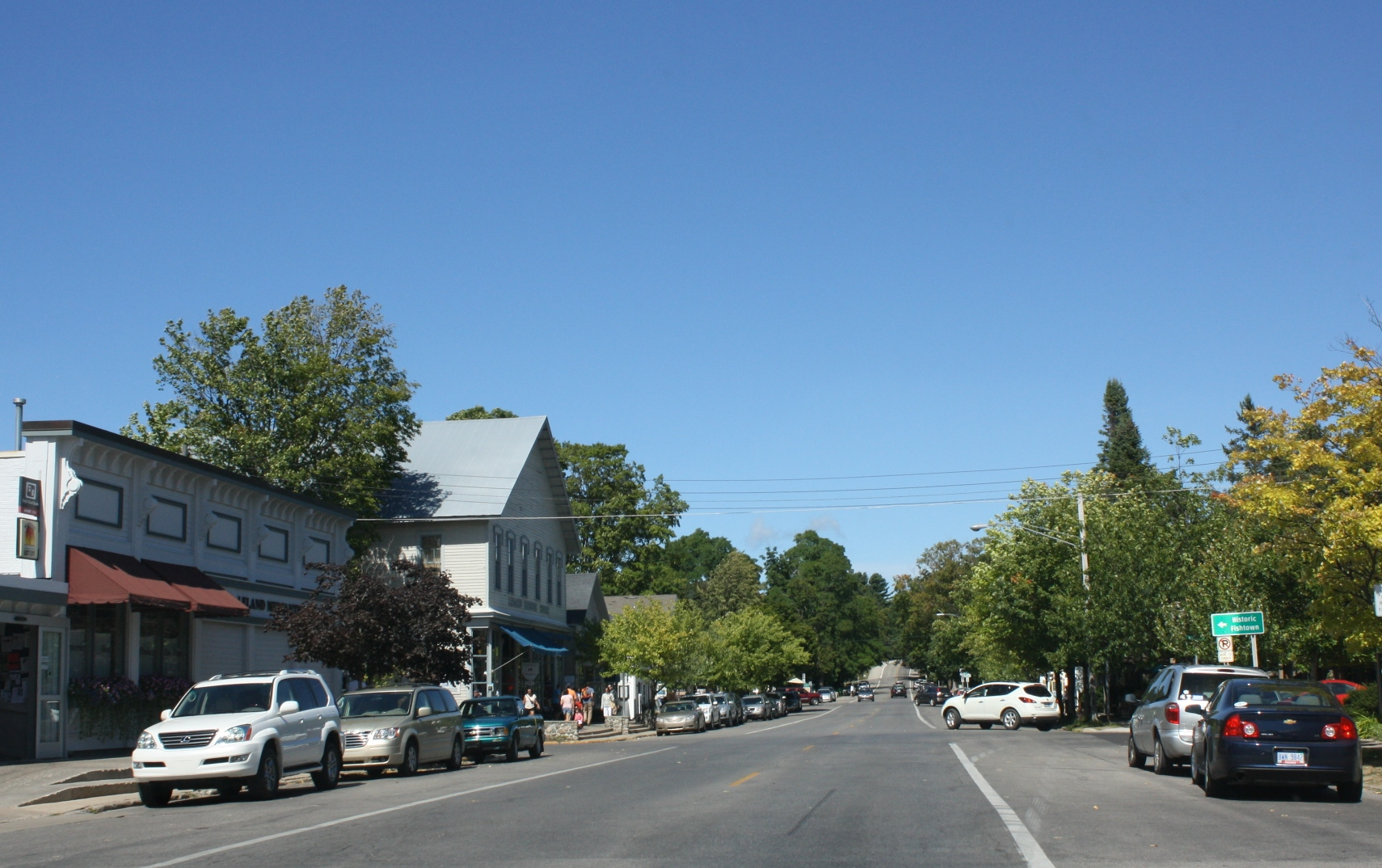
Downtown Leland on M-22

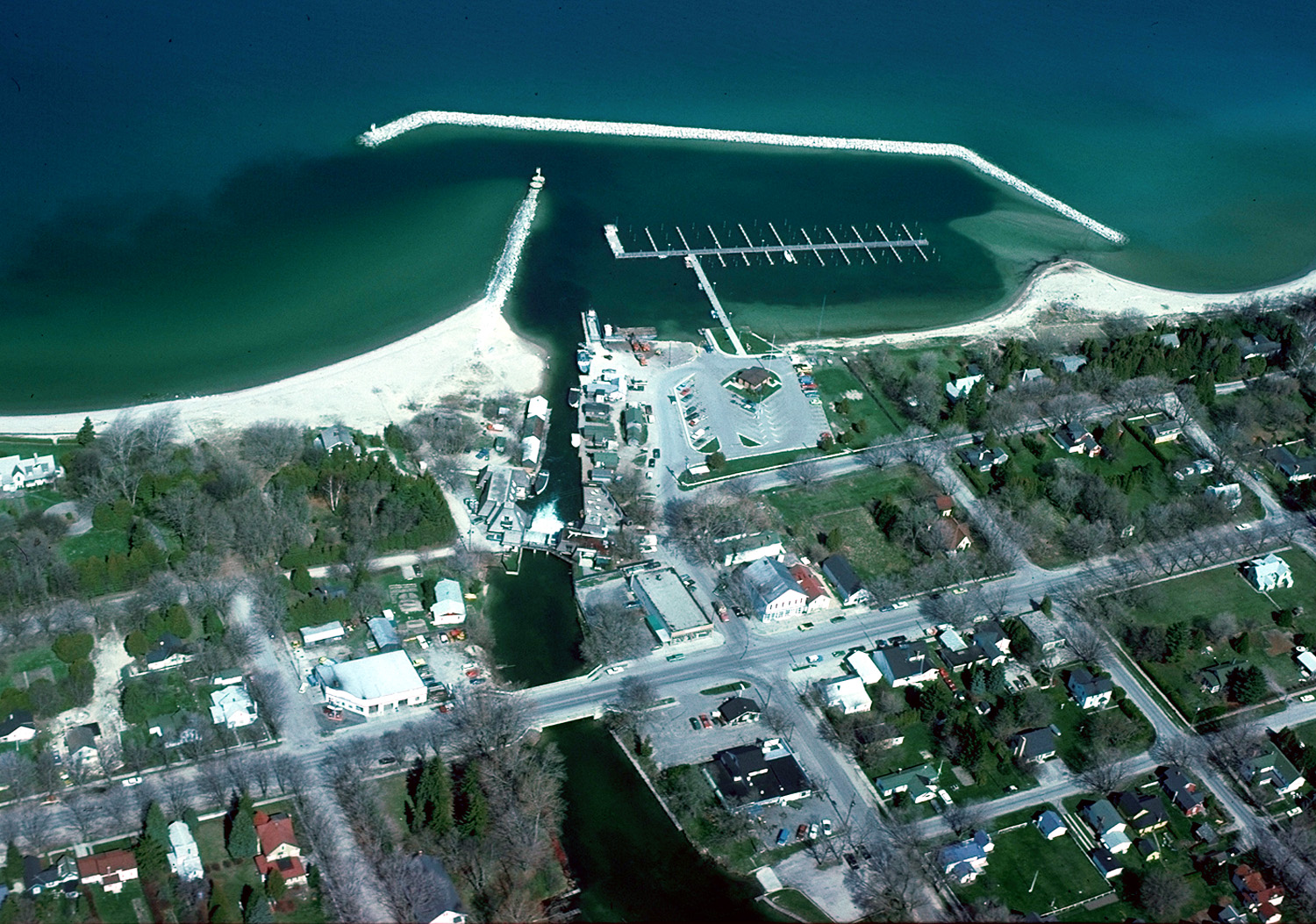
Aerial view of Leland Harbor and Lake Michigan

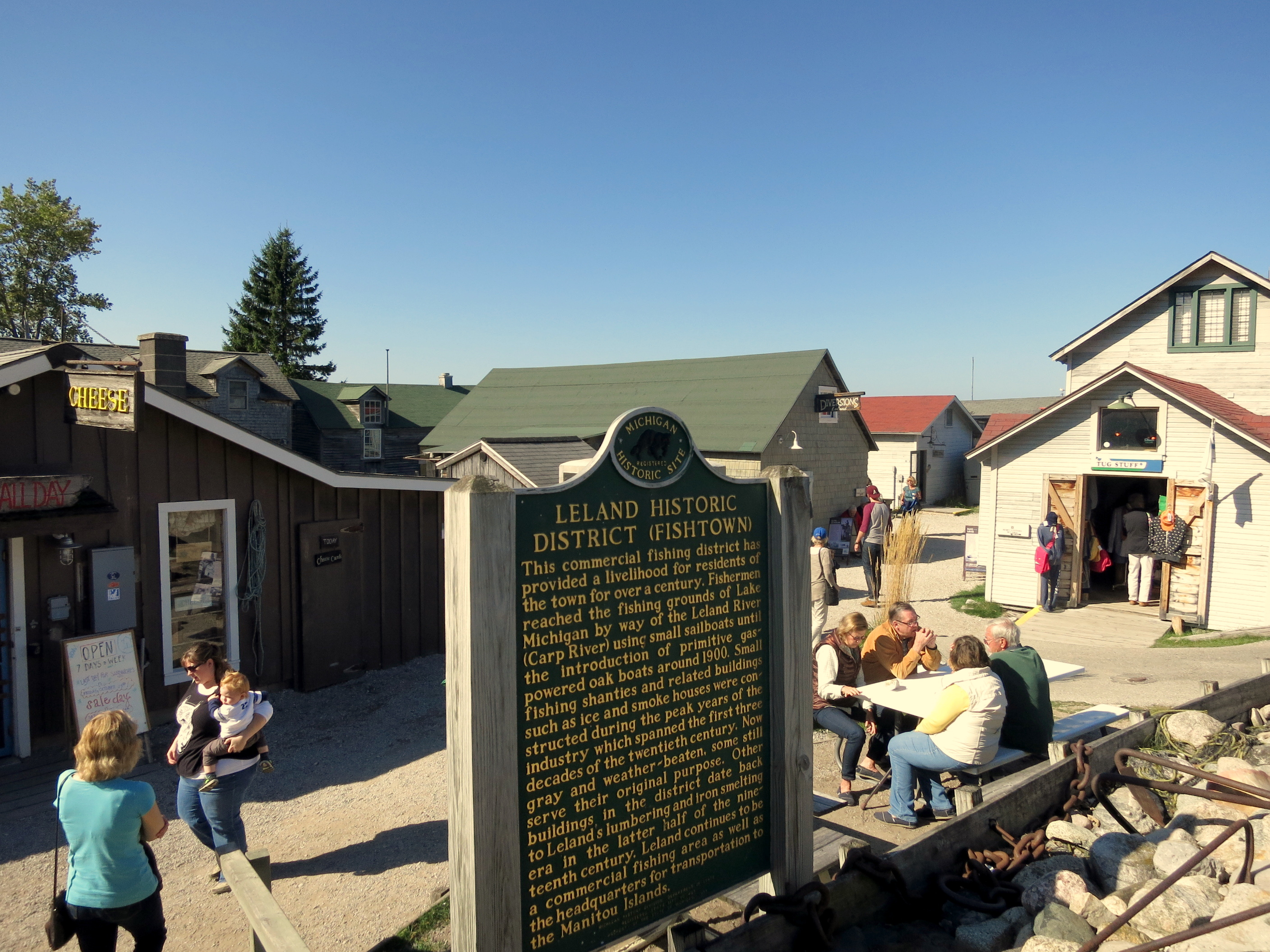
Fishtown Historical Marker

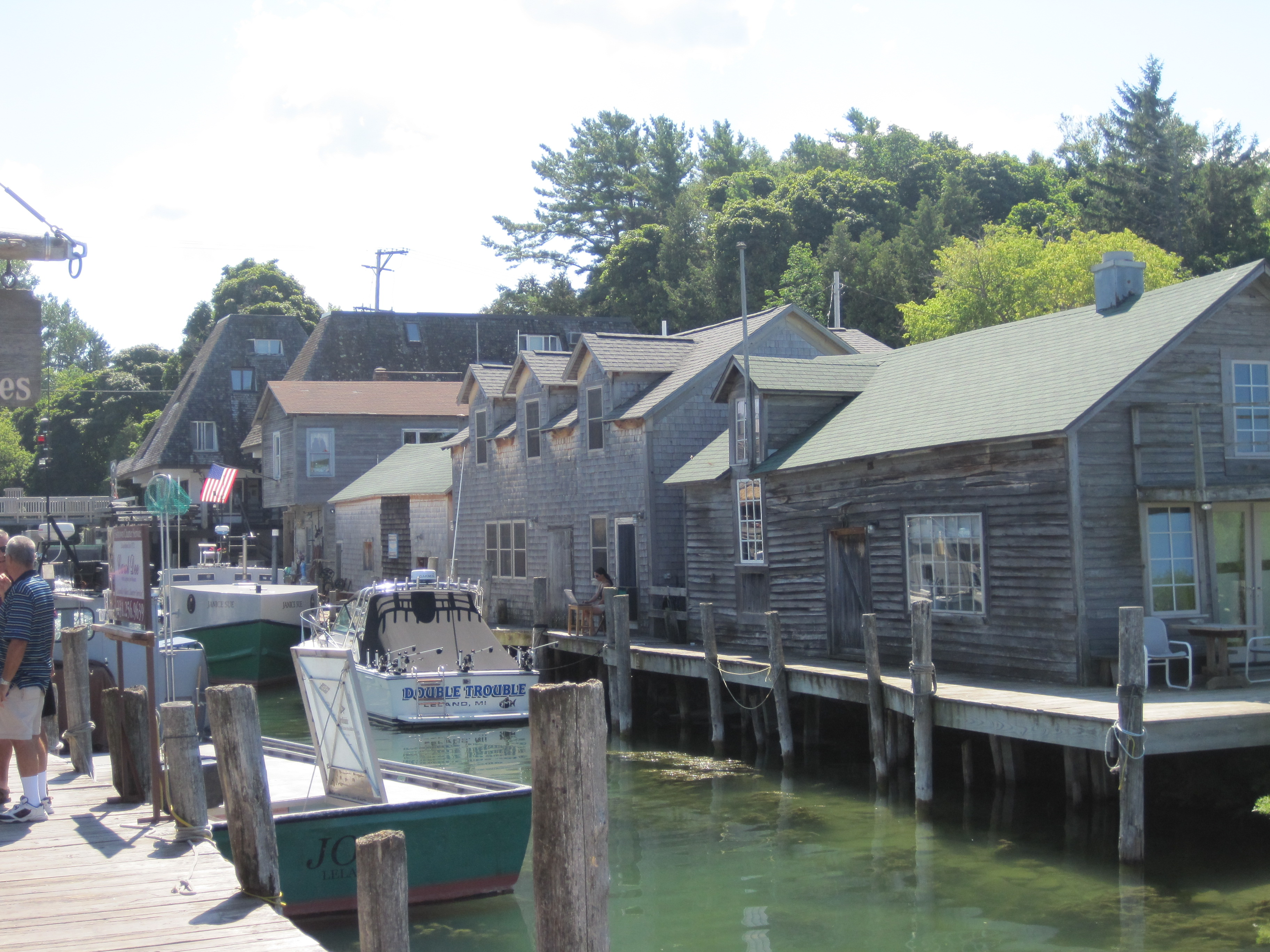
Buildings along the Leland River

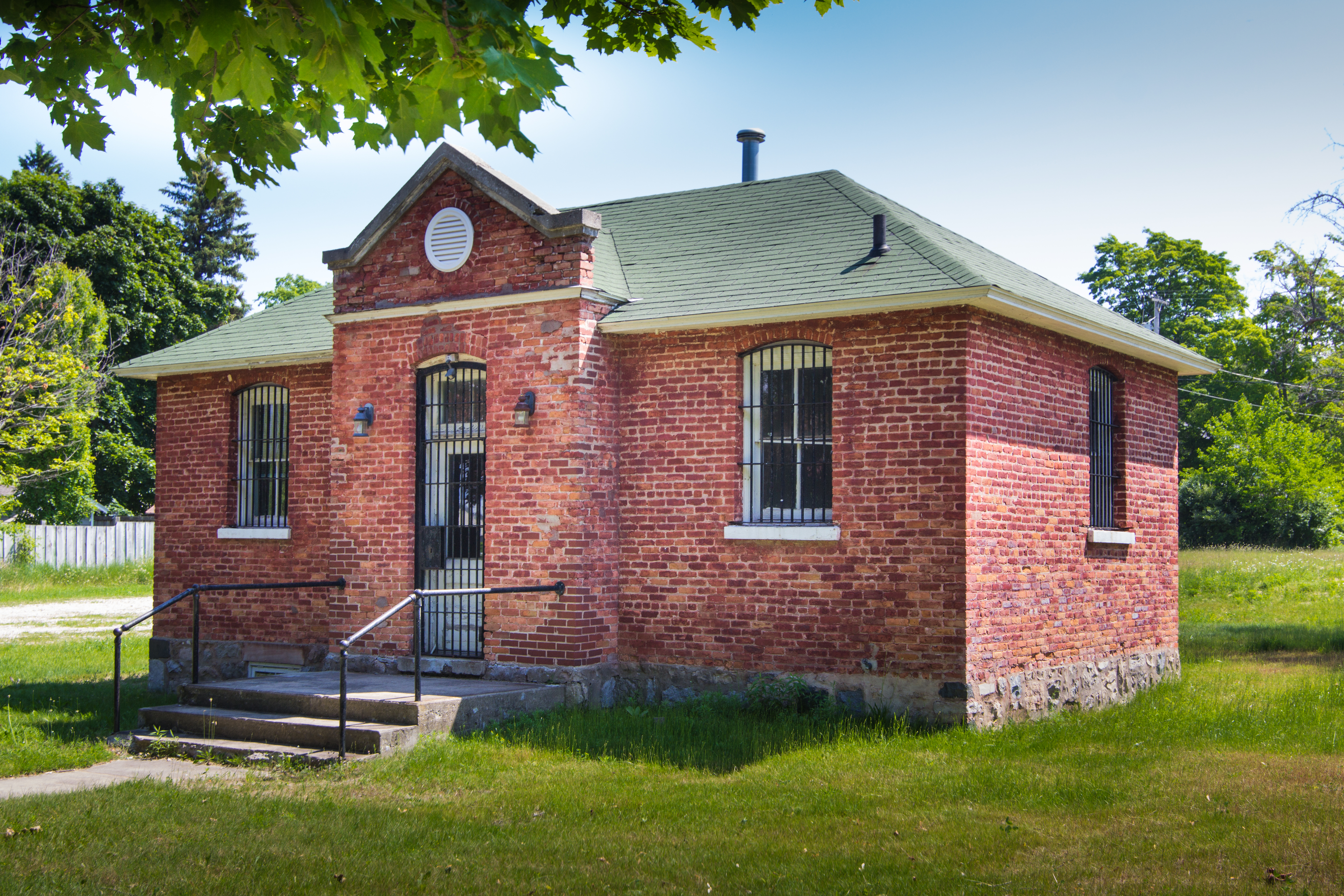
The former Leelanau County jail

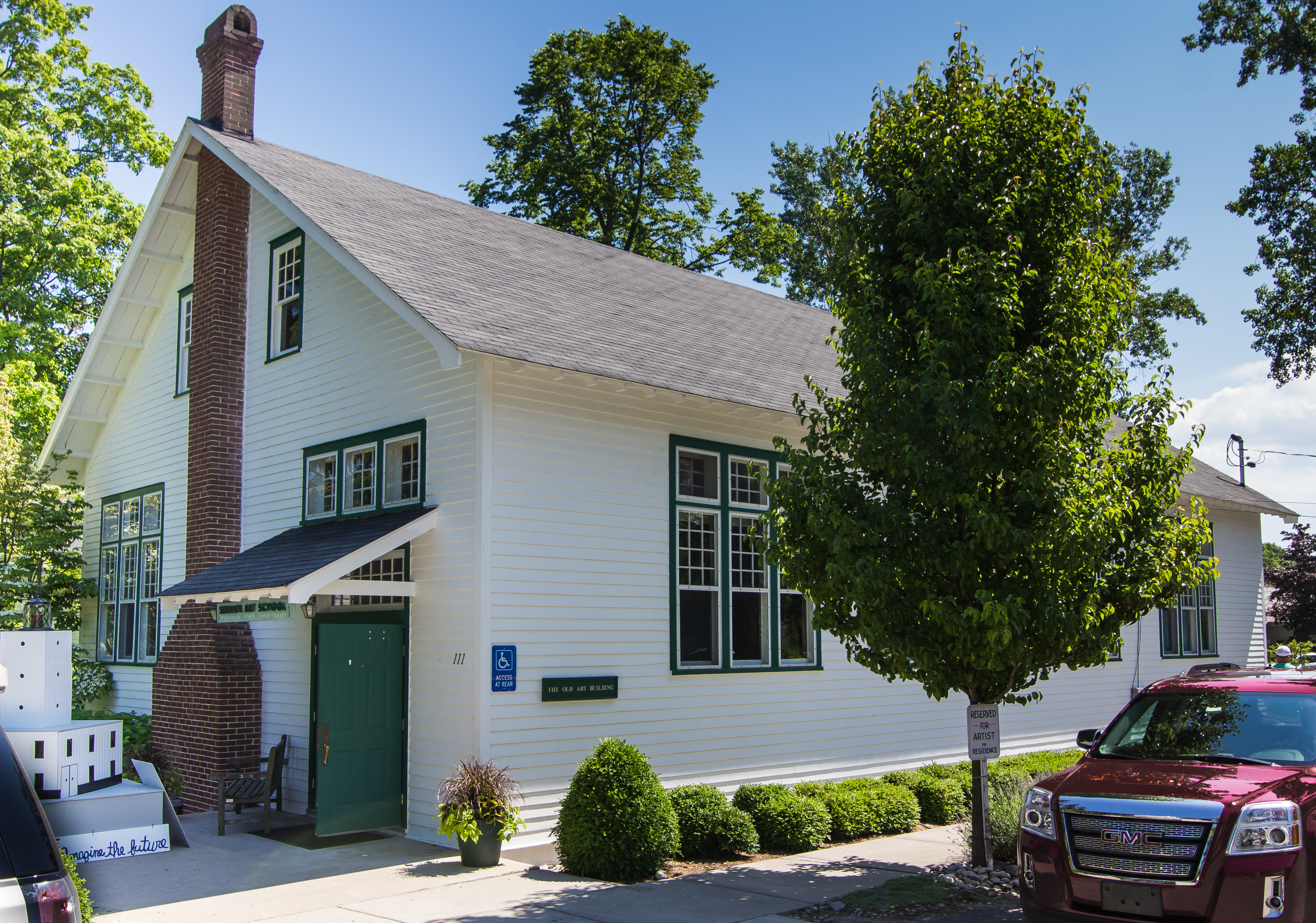
Walter T. Best Women's Club House

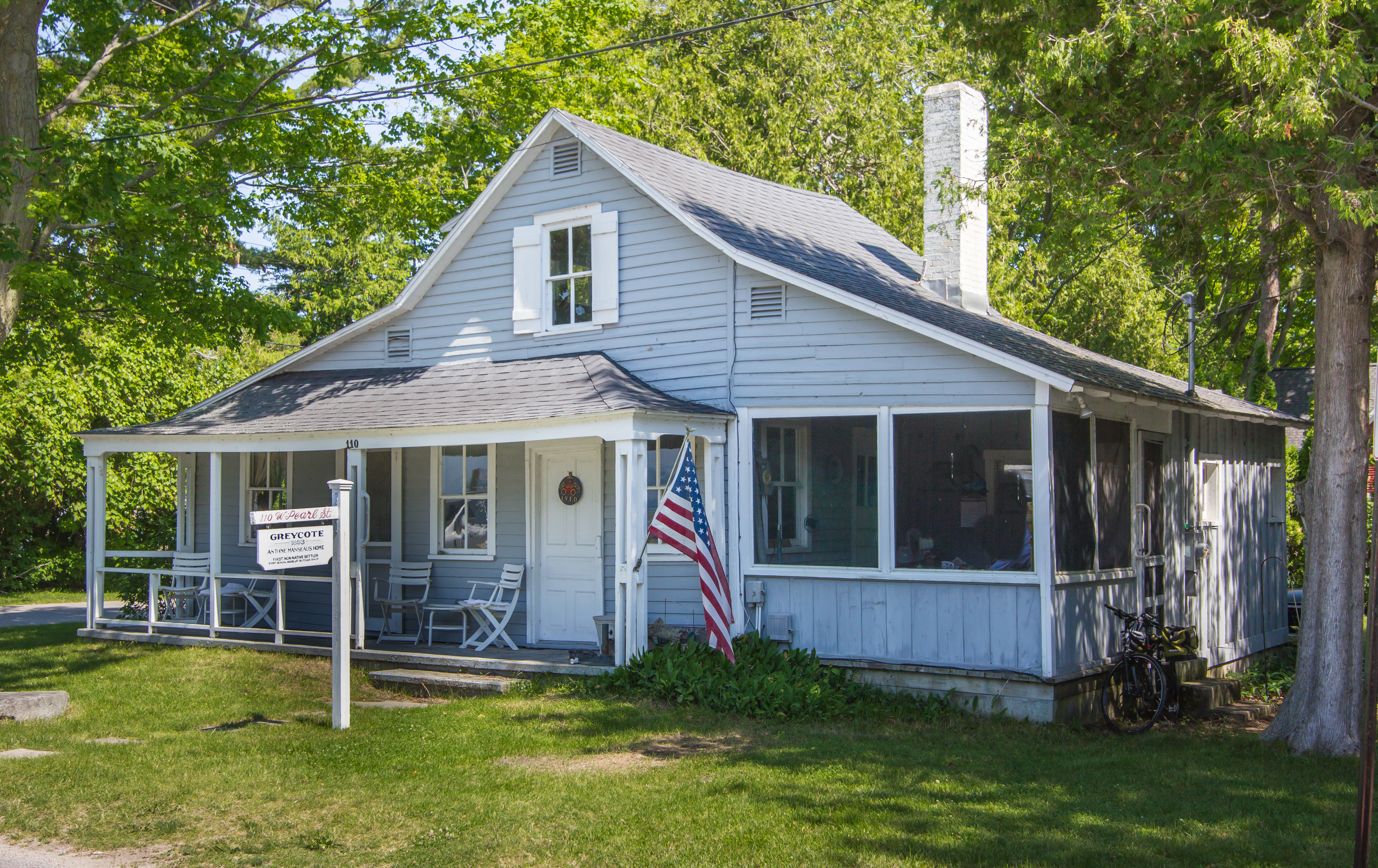
Greycote Cottage

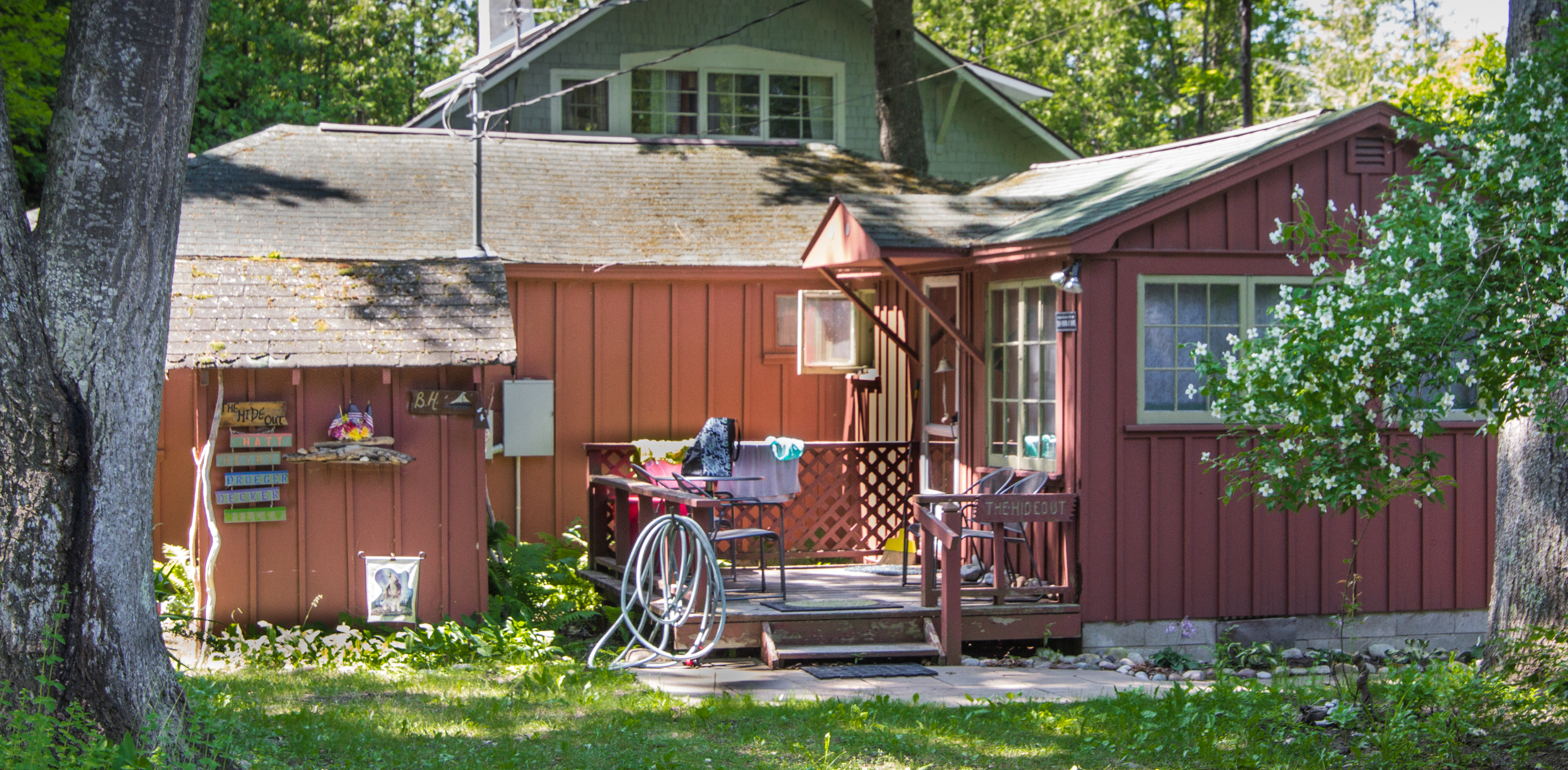
W.K. Hatt Cottage

== Notable people ==
- Tim Allen (born 1953), comedian, actor
- Thomas W. L. Ashley (1923–2010), U.S. representative (Ohio)
- The Ball Brothers, industrialists and philanthropists
- Charles E. Bennison (born 1943), Episcopal bishop of Pennsylvania
- Barbara Ninde Byfield (1930–1988), author, illustrator
- Mark Clark (1896–1984), WW2 general, Citadel president
- John J. Gilligan (1921–2013), U.S. representative, governor of Ohio
- Alisha Glass (born 1988), Olympic volleyball player
- Jim Harrison (1937–2016), author, township resident from 1968 to 2002
- Harlan Hatcher (1898–1998), University of Michigan president
- Arthur F. Lederle (1887–1972), U.S. federal judge
- Alvin Mansfield Owsley (1888–1967), attorney, diplomat
- Keewaydinoquay Peschel (ca. 1919–1999), ethnobotanist, herbalist, educator
- Emelia Schaub (1891–1995), county prosecutor, first female attorney in Michigan
- Kathleen Sebelius (born 1948), U.S. Secretary of Health and Human Services, governor of Kansas, daughter of John J. Gilligan
- Tobin Sprout (born 1955), songwriter, guitarist (Guided by Voices)
