= Richard Byfield =

English clergyman

Richard Byfield (1598?–1664) was an English clergyman, Sabbatarian controversialist, member of the Westminster Assembly, and ejected minister.

== Life ==
He was 16 years of age in 1615 and 67 at his death in December 1664; he was probably born in 1598. He was a son of Richard Byfield by his second wife, and Nicholas Byfield was his elder half-brother. In Michaelmas term 1615 he was entered either as servitor or batler at The Queen's College, Oxford. He graduated B.A. 19 October 1619, and M.A. 29 October 1622.

He was curate or lecturer at Isleworth, probably during his brother's incumbency (i.e. before 8 September 1622), and had some other minor employments before being presented in 1627 by Sir Thomas Evelyn to the rectory of Long Ditton, Surrey. He sat in the Westminster Assembly, but was not one of the divines nominated in the original ordinance of 12 June 1643, being appointed, perhaps through the influence of his nephew Adoniram Byfield, to fill the vacancy caused by the 1645 death of Daniel Featley. In 1654 he was appointed one of the assistant commissioners for Surrey, under the ordinance of 29 June for the ejection of scandalous, &c. ministers and schoolmasters. He held his rectory until the passing of the Uniformity Act 1662; he retired to Mortlake, where he was in the habit of preaching twice every Sunday in his own family, and did so the Sunday before his death. He died suddenly in December 1664, and was buried in Mortlake church.

== Works ==
Some of the works of his brother Nicholas have been assigned to Richard; he edited a few of them. His own works are:

- 'The Light of Faith and Way of Holiness,' 1630.
- 'The Doctrine of the Sabbath Vindicated, in Confutation of a Treatise of the Sabbath written by Mr. Edward Brerewood against Mr. Nicholas Byfield,' 1631. Byfield attacks the spelling 'Sabaoth' adopted by Edward Brerewood.
- 'A Brief Answer to a lae Treatise of the Sabbath Day,' 1636? (given to Byfield by Peter Heylin, in The History of the Sabbath,' 2nd edit. 1636; it was in reply to A Treatise of the Sabbath Day &c., 1635, by Francis White, who rejoined in An Examination and Confutation, &c. 1637).
- 'The Power of the Christ of God,' &c. 1641.
- 'Zion's Answer to the Nation's Ambassadors,' &c. 1645 (fast sermon before the House of Commons on 25 June, from Is. xiv. 32).
- 'Temple Defilers defiled,' 1645 (two sermons at Kingston upon Thames from 1 Cor. iii. 17; reissued with new title-page 'A short Treatise describing the true Church of Christ,' &c., 1653, directed against schism, anabaptism and libertinism).
- 'A message sent from . . . Scotland to ... the Prince of Wales,' 1648 (letter from Byfield).
- 'The Gospel's Glory without prejudice to the Law,' &c., 1659 (an exposition of Rom. viii. 3, 4).
- 'The real Way to good Works: a Treatise of Charity.'
