= Edward Brerewood =

English scholar and antiquary

- Born: 1565–1613
- Citizenship: British
- Education: Brasenose College, Oxford
- Occupation: Mathematician

Edward Brerewood (or Bryerwood) (c. 1565–1613) was an English scholar and antiquary. He was a mathematician and logician, and wrote an influential book on the origin of languages.

== Life ==
He was son of Robert Brerewood, a wetglover, three times mayor of Chester, and was born and educated there at The King's School. In 1581 he was sent to Brasenose College, Oxford, graduating B.A. 15 February 1587, and M.A. 9 July 1590. Then he migrated to St. Mary Hall, and on 26 September 1592, when Queen Elizabeth was at Oxford, he replied at a disputation in natural philosophy. In March 1596 he was chosen the first Gresham Professor of Astronomy in London.

Brerewood, who was a member of the Old Society of Antiquaries, died on 4 November 1613, and was buried in the church of Great St. Helen. His library he bequeathed with his other effects to his nephew Robert Brerewood, a son of his elder brother, John Brerewood.

He is related to Thomas Brerewood (c.1670 – 22 December 1746), the grandson of Sir Robert Brerewood.

== Writings and influence ==
Enquiries touching the diversity of languages and religions, through the chief parts of the world (1614) was published after his death by Robert Brerewood. There was a French translation in 1640 that attracted the attention of Richard Simon. In 1655 the text was translated into German by Wilhelm Smeeth.

Brerewood proposed in it that the Native Americans were descendants of the Tartars; with that, he rejected the theory of Guillaume Postel identifying the Tartars as descending from the Lost Tribes. Influentially, he tried to quantify Christians in the world, giving figures 19 parts heathen, 6 parts Muslim and 5 parts Christian by population, from 30 parts in all. These figures were still being quoted by John Wesley, well over a century later.

A learned treatise of the Sabbath took up a criticism of strict Sabbatarianism against Nicholas Byfield. According to Christopher Hill, "No one penetrated so deeply into the social issues involved in the Sabbatarian controversy".

== Works ==
His works are:

- De ponderibus et pretiis veterum nummorum, eorumque cum recentioribus collatione, London, 1614. This was first published by his nephew, and afterwards inserted in the 'Apparatus' of the Biblia Polyglotta, by Brian Walton, and also in the Critici Sacri, vol. viii.
- Enquiries touching the Diversities of Languages and Religions through the chief parts of the world, London, 1614, 1622, 1635, 1647, &c. This was likewise published by his nephew, and afterwards translated into French by J. de la Montagne, Paris, 1640, and into Latin by John Johnston. Richard Simon made some remarks on Brerewood's work, under the pseudonym of le Sieur de Moni, in a treatise entitled Histoire critique de la créance et des coûtumes des nations du Levant, Frankfort (really printed at Amsterdam), 1684. In 1693 it was reprinted, and again since that date with the following alterations in the title:—Histoire critique des dogmes, des controverses, des coûtumes, et des ceremonies des Chretiens orientaux.
- Elementa Logicæ, in gratiam studiosæ juventutis in academia Oxoniensi, London, 1614, 1615, &c.
- Tractatus quidam logici de prædicabilibus, et prædicamentis, Oxford, 1628, 1637, &c. This book was first published by Thomas Sixesmith, M. A., fellow of Brasenose College, Oxford. A manuscript of it is preserved in Queen's College library in that university. The work is sometimes quoted as 'Brerewood de moribus.'
- 'Tractatus duo: quorum primus est de meteoris, secundus de oculo,' Oxford, 1631, 1638. These two tracts were also published by Sixesmith.
- A Treatise of the Sabbath, Oxford, 1630, 1631. This book was written as a letter to Nicholas Byfield, preacher at Chester, having been occasioned by a sermon of his relating to the morality of the Sabbath. It is dated from Gresham House 15 July 1611. Richard Byfield, Nicholas's brother, wrote a reply to it.
- Mr. Byfield's Answer, with Mr. Brerewood's Reply, Oxford, 1631. These were both printed together, with the second edition of the former.
- A second Treatise of the Sabbath, or an Explication of the Fourth Commandment, Oxford, 1632.
- Commentarii in Ethica Aristotelis, Oxford, 1640. These commentaries relate only to the first four books, and were published by Sixesmith.
- A Declaration of the Patriarchal Government of the antient Church, Oxford, 1641, London, 1647, Bremen, 1701. The Oxford edition is subjoined to a treatise called 'The original of Bishops and Metropolitans, briefly laid down by Archbishop Ussher,' &c.
