= Gamul House =

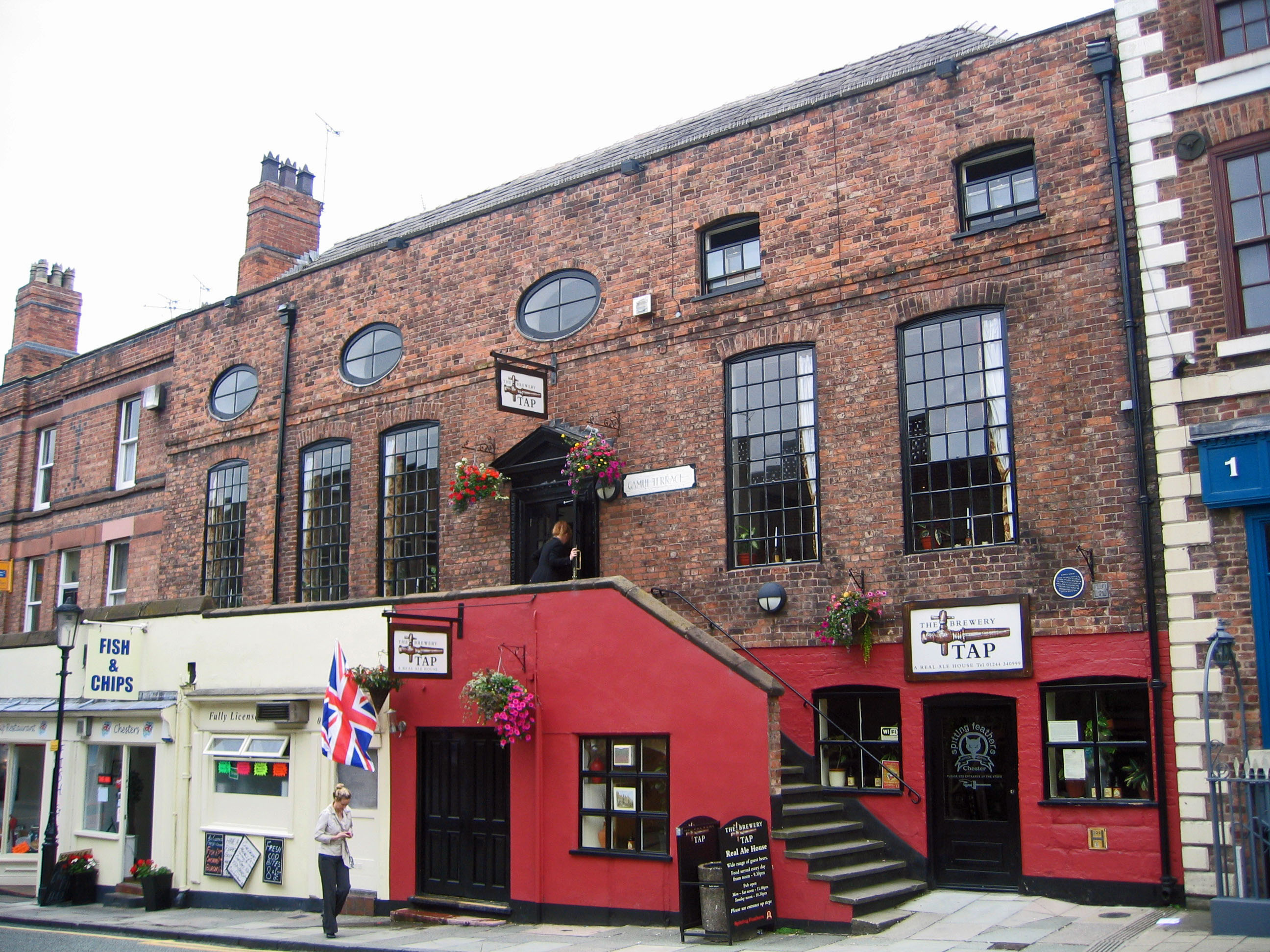
- Gamul House

- Location in Cheshire
- 53.1871°N 2.8903°W
- Location: 52–58 Lower Bridge Street, Chester, Cheshire, England
- OS grid reference: SJ 406 659

History
- Built: 13th century
- Rebuilt: Late 17th century

Site notes
- Restored: 1970s
- Restored by: Chester City Council

Listed Building – Grade II*
- Designated: 20 July 1955
- Reference no.: 1376310

Gamul House is at 52–58 Lower Bridge Street, Chester, Cheshire, England. It is recorded in the National Heritage List for England as a designated Grade II* listed building, and contains the only medieval stone-built open hall to survive in Chester.

== History ==
The date of its original building is not known but it was altered in the 17th, 18th and 20th centuries. It became housing, named locally as Boarding School Yard in later years. At the time of the Civil War the house was the home of Sir Francis Gamul, a Royalist supporter and colonel of the Town Guard. Charles I stayed in the house on 23–24 September 1645, when his army was defeated at the Battle of Rowton Moor.

Following the Great Fire of London the town Assembly ruled in 1671 that all the houses in the main streets should have roofs of slate or tile. The medieval frontage of Gamul House was replaced by a brick façade, but the hall was retained. In the 18th century the stone arches in the undercroft were replaced by brick vaults. During the following century this area was occupied by shops. For a time it housed a boarding school but this closed in the 1860s. In the 20th century the house became unoccupied and neglected; when Nikolaus Pevsner visited Chester in the late 1960s he reported that it looked derelict. It was bought by Chester City Council and during the 1970s a major refurbishment took place. As of 2009 the building is occupied by a restaurant and shops.

== Architecture ==
=== Exterior ===
The building is constructed in sandstone and timber framing, with a brick frontage and has three storeys. The lowest storey (an undercroft) is occupied by shops. An external staircase parallel to the street has 15 steps leading up to the former row level. Behind the staircase at street level is another shop frontage consisting of a door with a four-light window on each side. The middle storey has a door with an architrave and pediment. There are three windows to the south of the door and two windows to the north, all with 40 panes of glass. Above these is a string course. In the top storey are three oval windows with four panes and two sash windows with six panes. The roof is in grey slate with its ridge parallel to the street; it is hipped at its north end and at the south end is a gable and a chimney stack.

=== Interior ===
The undercroft contains a large oak beam and brick barrel vaults. At the row level, the great hall occupies the two storeys. On the west wall of the hall is an ornate sandstone fireplace with decorated pilasters carrying a carved frieze and cornice. On the fireplace is a painting of the arms of the Gamul family, which Pevsner considers was executed by Randle Holme. The barrel-vaulted plaster ceiling has eight richly-carved pendants.

== Today ==
As of 2009 the Row level is occupied by the Brewery Tap Ale House, owned by the Spitting Feathers brewery, based in Waverton.

== See also ==
- Grade II* listed buildings in Cheshire West and Chester
