= Nicholas Byfield =

English clergyman (1579–1622)

Nicholas Byfield (1579 – 1622) was an English clergyman who was a leading preacher of the reign of James I.

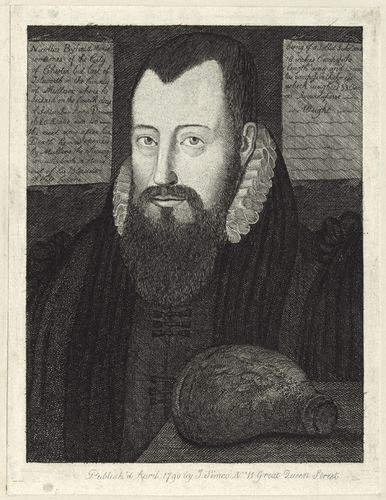
Nicholas Byfield, 1790 engraving published by John Simco.

== Life ==
Byfield was a native of Warwickshire, son of Richard Byfield (by his first wife), who became vicar of Stratford-on-Avon in January 1597. The ejected minister Richard Byfield was his half-brother.

Nicholas entered Exeter College, Oxford in the Lent term of 1596, and spent four years at university but did not graduate. Taking orders, he intended to exercise his ministry in Ireland; but on his way there he preached at Chester, and was prevailed upon to remain as one of the city preachers, although he decided not to stay. He lectured at St. Peter's church, and was extremely popular. John Bruen was one of his hearers, and a friend to him.

On 31 March 1615, Byfield was admitted to the vicarage of Isleworth, in succession to Thomas Hawkes. At this point he was chaplain to Edward Russell, 3rd Earl of Bedford. At Isleworth he preached twice every Sunday, and gave expository lectures every Wednesday and Friday. He continued until five weeks before his death, from the stone. He died on Sunday, 8 September 1622. The following day a surgeon removed from his body a stone which weighed 35 ounces; William Gouge was present at the autopsy. By his wife, Elizabeth, Byfield had at least eight children, of whom the third was Adoniram Byfield.

== Works ==
Byfield's works were numerous, and most of them went through many editions, some as late as 1665. His expository works are Calvinistic.

His first publication was An Essay concerning the Assurance of God's Love and of Man's Salvation, 1614. This was followed by An Exposition upon the Epistle to the Colossians . . . being the substance of neare seaven yeeres weeke-dayes sermons, 1615. The Marrow of the Oracles of God, 1620, (the last work published by Byfield himself), is a collection of six treatises.

In 1611, Byfield was involved in a controversy on the sabbath question; a Chester boy, John Brerewood, was one of his catechists, and had been trained by Byfield in strict Sabbatarian habits. When John went to London to serve as an apprentice, he refused to do his master's errands on Sundays, such as fetching wine and feeding a horse, and obeyed only under compulsion. He wrote to Byfield with his case of conscience, and was told to disobey. His uncle, Edward Brerewood, gave him contrary advice, taking the ground that the fourth commandment was laid only upon masters. Brerewood opened a correspondence with Byfield on the subject. The discussion was not published until both Brerewood and Byfield had been long dead. It appeared at Oxford as A Learned Treatise of the Sabaoth, . . . 1630; second edition, 1631. Byfield's part in it is curt and harsh; Brerewood charges his correspondent with 'ignorant phantasies'.

== Attribution ==
This article incorporates text from a publication now in the public domain: "Byfield, Nicholas". Dictionary of National Biography. London: Smith, Elder & Co. 1885–1900.
