= Francis Gamull =

English politician

Sir Francis Gamull, 1st Baronet (1606–1654) was an English politician who sat in the House of Commons from 1640 to 1644. He supported the Royalist side in the English Civil War and was active in the defence of Chester.

Gamull was the son of Thomas Gamull. The family was of Buerton, Chester He entered Inner Temple in November 1622. In 1634 he became mayor of Chester. He was elected member of parliament for City of Chester for the Long Parliament in November 1640.

During the Civil War, Gamull was very active in the defence of Chester. In June 1643 he established a town guard, of which he was colonel, and enlisted all able-bodied men between 16 and 60. After the governor, Sir Nicholas Byron, was captured in March 1644, King Charles proposed Gamull in his place, but Gamull was rejected because he was unpopular with the citizens and opposed by other royalist leaders. Gamull was disabled from sitting in parliament on 22 January 1644, but was created in the baronet of Chester in April 1644. He was nominated as mayor in 1644 but was rejected. By April 1645 there were signs of popular antagonism towards Gamull and his Welsh soldiers, as conditions under the siege became increasingly difficult. Gamull entertained King Charles at town house in Chester and was with him on the Phoenix Tower when they watched the defeat of the Royalist army at the Battle of Rowton Heath.

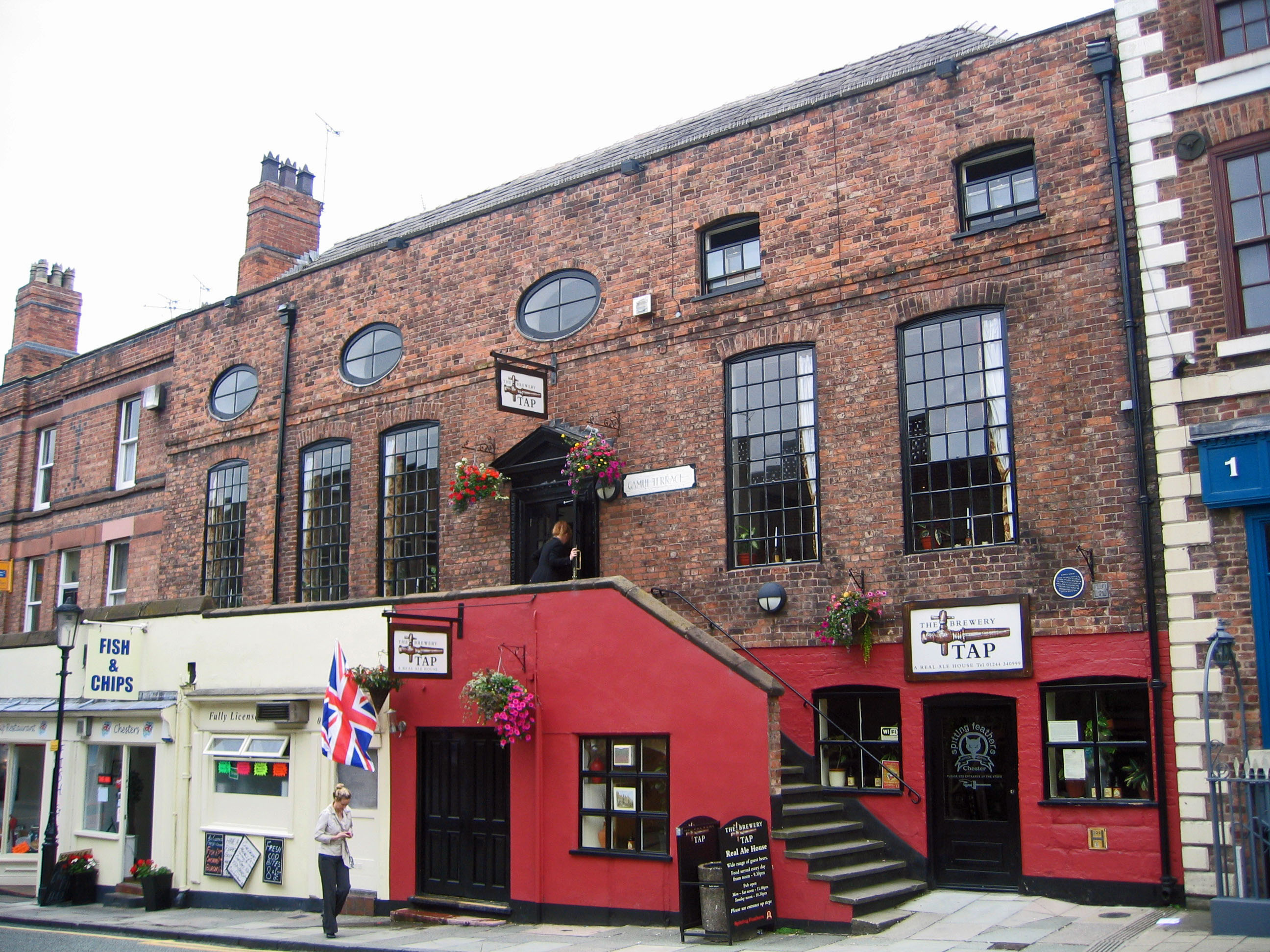
Gamul House in Chester

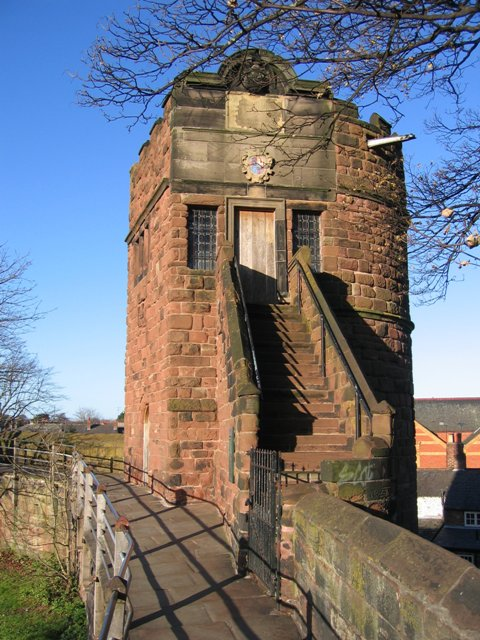
Phoenix Tower on Chester city walls, where Charles watched his army lose.

After the siege had ended Gamull and other Royalists were dismissed from the town's administration in October 1646, and he was fined £940. Gamull died at the age of 48 after an abortive uprising for the future Charles II. His son-in-law stated that he was executed at Exeter. The Parish Register of St. Mary-on-the-Hill in Chester states that he was buried there on 27 November 1654.

Gamull married, as his first wife, Christian Grosvenor daughter of Sir Richard Grosvenor, 1st Baronet in 1621. They had two daughters, and the baronetcy became extinct on his death.

Parliament of England
Preceded by Sir Thomas Smith; Robert Brerewood	Member of Parliament for City of Chester; 1640; With: Sir Thomas Smith	Succeeded by William Edwards; John Ratcliffe
Baronetage of England
New creation	Baronet (of Chester); 1644–1654	Extinct
