= Thomas Brerewood =

Thomas Brerewood's Estate and Thomas Pitkins' Creditors Act 1706
- Act of Parliament
- Parliament of England
- Long title: An Act to subject the Estate of Thomas Brerewood to the Creditors of Thomas Pitkin, notwithstanding any Agreement or Composition made by the Creditors of the said Thomas Pitkin.
- Citation: 6 Ann. c. 23 (Note: This is the citation in The Statutes of the Realm.); 5 Ann. c. 23 (Note: This is the citation in The Statutes at Large.)
- Territorial extent: England and Wales

Dates
- Royal assent: 8 April 1707
- Commencement: 3 December 1706 (Note: Start of session.)
- Repealed: 30 July 1948
Other legislation
Repealed by	Statute Law Revision Act 1948
Relates to	Thomas Pitkin's Bankruptcy Act 1704

Status: Repealed

Text of statute as originally enacted

Thomas Brerewood (c.1670 – 22 December 1746), was a 'Gentleman Entrepreneur & Fraudster'. He was involved with the "Pitkin Affair" of 1705, a bankruptcy fraud committed with his business partner Thomas Pitkin that was surpassed in scale only by the South Sea Bubble of 1720. Brerewood was eventually pardoned and was able to rebuild his fortune. From 1741, to his death on 22 December 1746, Brerewood held office as the clerk of Baltimore County.

== Early life ==
Thomas Brerewood was born circa 1670 to a well-known Chester family. He was the son of Henry Brerewood, and a grandson of Sir Robert Brerewood. He was apprenticed to his uncle, Francis Brerewood, Treasurer of Christ's Hospital, London in June 1686 and admitted to the Fishmongers' Company in 1699.
