= Barbara Ninde Byfield =

American writer and illustrator (1930–1988)

Barbara Ninde Byfield (née Ninde; 28 March 1930 – 8 November 1988) was an American author and illustrator.

== Bibliography ==
She was born in Abilene, Texas. Marrying Hugh W. Byfield in 1956, she had her first book published in 1962 The Eating in Bed Cook Book that she also illustrated. In 1967 she wrote and illustrated The Glass Harmonica: A Lexicon of the Fantastical. It was reprinted in 1973 as The Book of Weird as there was only a brief mention of the glass harmonica in the original work.

In 1969, she began writing and illustrating a series of books for young readers beginning with The Haunted Spy about a retired spy named Hannibel Stern who with his dog Zero retires to live in a castle on an island, making friends with a 400-year-old ghost Sir Roger de Rudisell (Byfield's mother's maiden name) who advises him. The series continued with The Haunted Churchbell (1971), The Haunted Ghost (1973), and The Haunted Tower in 1976.

Collaborating with Frank Tedeschi, Byfield co-authored four adventures of a clerical detective Rev. Dr. Simon Bede and photographer Helen Bullock with their investigations recounted in Solemn High Murder (1975), Forever Wilt Thou Die (1976), A Harder Thing Than Triumph (1977), and A Parcel of Their Fortunes (1978).

Byfield also illustrated works for other authors such as Donald Hutter's Upright Hilda (1968), Harvey Swados' The Mystery of the Haunted Mine (1971), William H. Armstrong's Hadassah: Esther the Orphan Queen (1972) and Herb Caen's The Cable Car and the Dragon (1972).

She died in Leland, Michigan.

== Quotes ==
There is a secret, wholesome indulgence to eating in bed which perhaps explains why it has not received the uniformly good press of other things which go on in bed... - from The Eating in Bed Cook Book
