= Adoniram Byfield =

English clergyman (died 1660)

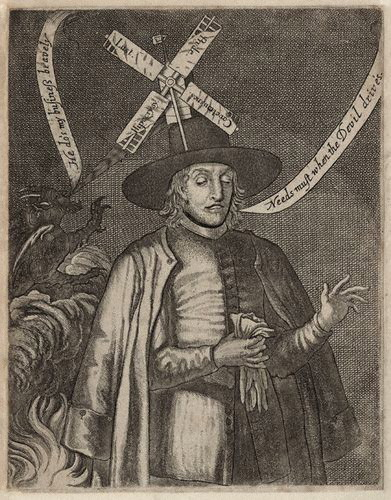
Adoniram Byfield

Adoniram Byfield or Bifield (died 1660) was an English clergyman, one of the scribes to the Westminster Assembly. The surviving minutes of the Assembly, which according to a project to have them published "arguably constitute the most important unpublished religious text of seventeenth-century Britain", run to over half a million words and are almost all in Byfield's writing.

== Life ==
He was the third son of Nicholas Byfield, probably born before 1615. He was educated at Emmanuel College, Cambridge, where he matriculated in 1620, and graduated B.A. in 1624. He was ordained in 1625 and became perpetual curate of the London church All Hallows Staining in 1629.

In 1642, he was chaplain to Sir Henry Cholmondeley's regiment. On 6 July 1643 he was appointed one of the two scribes to the Westminster Assembly, the other being Henry Roborough. Their assistant was John Wallis. The scribes were not members of the assembly of which they kept the record, nor were they at first allowed, like the members, to wear their hats; but in common with the other divines the scribes were entitled to the allowance (irregularly paid) of four shillings a day. For their trouble they received the copyright of the Directory of Public Worship (ordered to be published 13 March 1645), which they sold for £400.

It was during the sitting of the assembly that Byfield obtained first the sinecure rectory, and then the vicarage of Fulham. Isaac Knight succeeded him in the rectory in 1645, and in the vicarage in 1657. At some unknown date between 1649 and 1654 Byfield received an appointment to the rectory of Collingbourn Ducis, Wiltshire, from which Christopher Prior, D.D., had been removed. Byfield was not disturbed at the Restoration.

In 1654, he was nominated one of the assistant commissioners for Wiltshire, under the ordinance of 29 June for ejecting scandalous ministers, and was active among them, for example against Walter Bushnell, vicar of Box, (ejected in 1656). Byfield's assembly practice had made him sharp as an examiner. He died intestate in London, in the parish of St. Martin-in-the-Fields, in late 1660 or early 1661. His wife, Katharine, survived him, and administered to his effects on 12 February 1661. Samuel Butler in Hudibras' made him iconic of those zealots for presbytery whose tactics opened the way to independency.

== Works ==
Byfield's most important work consists of the manuscript minutes, or rough notes, of the debates in the assembly, which are almost entirely in his very difficult handwriting. They are preserved in Dr. Williams's Library, and were first edited by Alexander Ferrier Mitchell and John Struthers in 1874. According to Mitchell, Byfield had published a catechism some years before the assembly met. In 1626, he edited his father's Rule of Faith, a work on the Apostles' Creed. To Byfield is ascribed A Brief View of Mr. Coleman his new modell of Church Government, 1645. He also assisted Chambers in his Apology for the Ministers of the County of Wiltshire of 1654.
