= Robert Brerewood =

English lawyer and politician

Sir Robert Brerewood (1588 – 8 September 1654) was an English lawyer and politician who sat in the House of Commons in 1640.

== Early life and education ==
Brerewood was born in 1588, he was the son of Mary (born Parry) and John Brerewood who had been Sheriff of Chester. His sister Jane Ratcliffe was known for her religious life. The Brerewood family over several generations filled many public offices in Chester. In 1605 Brerewood was sent to Brasenose College, Oxford, and was later admitted to Middle Temple.

== Career ==
He was called to the bar on 13 November 1615, and practised for twenty-two years. He was given his uncle's Edward Brerewood library and he published some of the literary works. In 1637 he was appointed a judge of North Wales and was appointed reader at the Middle Temple in Lent term in 1638. He was chosen Recorder of Chester in 1639.

In April 1640, Brerewood was returned as Member of Parliament for Chester for the Short Parliament. Also in 1640 Brerewood became serjeant-at-law and in 1641 he was appointed king's serjeant. He was knighted in 1643, and raised to the bench as one of the Judges of the Common Pleas. He was sworn in at Oxford where King Charles I then was, and continued to sit until the end of the Civil War but never in Westminster Hall. After the execution of Charles I he retired into private life.

== Death ==
Brerewood died at the age of 66 and was buried in St Mary's Church, Chester.

== Personal life ==
Brerewood married twice, firstly to Anna Mainwaring, daughter of Sir Randall Mainwaring of Over Peover, Cheshire, and secondly to Katherine Lea, daughter of Sir Richard Lea of Lea and Dernhall, Cheshire, and had several children by each of his wives.

Parliament of England
Vacant Parliament suspended since 1629	Member of Parliament for Chester; 1640; With: Sir Thomas Smith	Succeeded by Sir Thomas Smith; Francis Gamull
