= 2024–25 Lake Superior State Lakers men's ice hockey season =

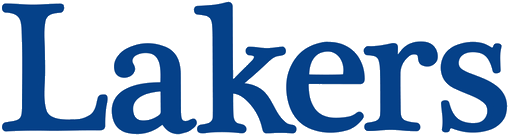
- Conference: 8th CCHA
- Home ice: Taffy Abel Arena

Rankings
- USCHO: NR
- USA Hockey: NR

Record
- Overall: 12–20–2
- Conference: 10–15–1
- Home: 4–10–1
- Road: 8–9–1
- Neutral: 0–1–0

Coaches and captains
- Head coach: Damon Whitten
- Assistant coaches: Mike York; D. J. Goldstein
- Captain: Grant Hindman
- Alternate captain(s): Connor Milburn; Dawson Tritt

The 2024–25 Lake Superior State Lakers men's ice hockey season was the 59th season of play for the program, the 52nd at the Division I level and the 45th in the CCHA. The Lakers represented Lake Superior State University, played their home games at the Taffy Abel Arena and were coached by Damon Whitten in his 11th season.

== Season ==
Lake Superior State had a bit of a Jekyll and Hyde season. Over the first two months, the Lakers put of solid numbers with both the offense and defense working in tandem on most nights. They sat at the top of the conference standings, however, due to their poor marks in non-conference play, the club was still well outside the picture for the NCAA tournament. However, after getting swept by Minnesota State just before the winter break, albeit in two 1-goal decisions, the wins came few and far between.

After averaging nearly 3 goals per game over the first half of the year, the Lakers' scoring dipped to around 2.3 per game after the break. The modest decrease saw the team switch from one that was hovering around .500 to one of the worst in the CCHA. Lake Superior State went 4–11–1 in the back half of the schedule, losing five 1-goal games to sink down to 8th in the standings. While the Lakers were able to make the postseason, they were forced to travel to face Minnesota State for the quarterfinals. After being largely ineffective in the first match, the Lakers fought back and twice gained the lead in the rematch. Unfortunately, they were unable to either and were swept out of postseason play.

While the mounting losses were bad enough for the program, a worse situation was seen in terms of attendance. By season's end, the team reported and aggregate of just over 15,000 for their 15 home games. That averaged out to approximately 1,034 fans per game, which equated to about 30% capacity. These numbers put LSSU 56th out of 64 teams in terms of total attendance but second from the bottom for percent capacity. The only team with worse average attendance for the year was American International who, in part because of their woeful attendance, were playing their final season of Division I hockey this year. To make matters worse, attendance appeared to decline as the season went along with many later games falling well below 1,000 attendees. The situation was so poor that on several occasions the team did not even report the crowd sizes for their home games.

With the financial requirements to operate college athletic increasing, largely due to the new NIL rules, these figures do not bode well for the program. If Lake Superior State wants to operate a competitive team, they will need to reverse their declining attendance before it reaches a cataclysmic level. Fortunately, just after the season the school announced that it had received a recurring annual commitment of $1.5 million from an anonymous benefactor.

== Departures ==
Player	Position	Nationality	Cause
Artyom Borshyov	Defenseman	Belarus	Graduate transfer to Lindenwood
Jeremy Gervais	Defenseman	Canada	Graduation (signed with Huntsville Havoc)
William Håkansson	Goaltender	Sweden	Signed professional contract Tranås AIF
Cam Kungle	Defenseman	United States	Transferred to Merrimack
Ethan Langenegger	Goaltender	Canada	Graduate transfer to Clarkson
Benito Posa	Forward	United States	Graduation (signed with Fort Wayne Komets)
Brett Roloson	Forward	Canada	Transferred to Niagara
Ross Roloson	Defenseman	Canada	Transferred to Niagara
Harrison Roy	Forward	United States	Graduate transfer to Merrimack
Jared Westcott	Forward	United States	Graduation (signed with Wheeling Nailers)
Tyler Williams	Forward	United States	Graduation (signed with Knoxville Ice Bears)

== Recruiting ==
Player	Position	Nationality	Age	Notes
William Ahlrik	Forward	Sweden	21	Tidaholm, SWE
Rorke Applebee	Goaltender	Canada	21	Châteauguay, QC
Adam Barone	Defenseman	Canada	21	Sault Ste. Marie, ON
Mike Brown	Defenseman	United States	23	Belmont, MA; transfer from Merrimack
Tyler Bute	Goaltender	United States	20	Winfield, IL; transfer from club team
Wilson Dahlheimer	Goaltender	United States	20	Monticello, MN
Johnny Druskinis	Defenseman	United States	22	Plymouth, MI; transfer from Michigan
Hadley Hudak	Forward	Canada	21	Canton, MI
Blake Humphrey	Forward	United States	22	Syracuse, NY; transfer from Sacred Heart
Everett Pietila	Forward	United States	21	Howell, MI
Grant Riley	Goaltender	United States	21	Rochester, NY; transfer from Northeastern

== Roster ==
As of August 14, 2024.

No.	Nat.	Player	Class	Pos	Height	Weight	DoB	Hometown	Previous team	NHL rights
1	(Canada)	Rorke Applebee	Freshman	G	6' 0" (1.83 m)	170 lb (77 kg)	2003-09-19	Châteauguay, Quebec	West Kelowna Warriors (BCHL)	—
2	(United States)	Bryan Huggins	Junior	D	5' 11" (1.8 m)	180 lb (82 kg)	2002-03-26	Grand Rapids, Michigan	Fargo Force (USHL)	—
3	(United States)	Mike Brown	Junior (RS)	D	6' 2" (1.88 m)	202 lb (92 kg)	2001-04-03	Belmont, Massachusetts	Merrimack (HEA)	—
4	(United States)	Jacob Conrad	Freshman (RS)	D	5' 11" (1.8 m)	180 lb (82 kg)	2002-05-18	Green Bay, Wisconsin	Fairbanks Ice Dogs (NAHL)	—
5	(United States)	Evan Bushy	Sophomore	D	6' 1" (1.85 m)	195 lb (88 kg)	2002-03-26	Mankato, Minnesota	Trail Smoke Eaters (BCHL)	—
6	(Canada)	Adam Barone	Freshman	D	6' 1" (1.85 m)	174 lb (79 kg)	2004-05-06	Sault Ste. Marie, Ontario	Trail Smoke Eaters (BCHL)	—
7	(United States)	Branden Piku	Sophomore	F	5' 8" (1.73 m)	165 lb (75 kg)	2002-08-25	Harrison Township, Michigan	Maryland Black Bears (NAHL)	—
8	(United States)	Jack Blanchett	Sophomore	F	5' 11" (1.8 m)	185 lb (84 kg)	2003-05-12	Monroe, Michigan	Powell River Kings (BCHL)	—
9	(Canada)	Connor Milburn (A)	Junior	F	6' 4" (1.93 m)	180 lb (82 kg)	2001-04-11	Kamloops, British Columbia	Chilliwack Chiefs (BCHL)	—
10	(United States)	Sasha Teleguine	Junior	F	5' 10" (1.78 m)	180 lb (82 kg)	2002-09-17	North Attleborough, Massachusetts	Chilliwack Chiefs (BCHL)	—
11	(United States)	Dawson Tritt (A)	Senior	F	6' 2" (1.88 m)	180 lb (82 kg)	2000-09-01	Spokane, Washington	Lone Star Brahmas (NAHL)	—
12	(Canada)	Reagan Milburn	Sophomore	F	6' 0" (1.83 m)	190 lb (86 kg)	2003-02-13	Kamloops, British Columbia	Vernon Vipers (BCHL)	—
13	(United States)	Wilson Dahlheimer	Freshman	F	5' 9" (1.75 m)	172 lb (78 kg)	2003-10-09	Monticello, Minnesota	Muskegon Lumberjacks (USHL)	—
14	(United States)	Nate Schweitzer	Senior	D	6' 0" (1.83 m)	186 lb (84 kg)	2002-02-21	Champlin, Minnesota	Colorado College (NCHC)	—
15	(United States)	Johnny Druskinis	Sophomore	D	6' 1" (1.85 m)	185 lb (84 kg)	2002-04-10	Plymouth, Michigan	Michigan (Big Ten)	—
16	(United States)	Blake Humphrey	Junior	F	5' 8" (1.73 m)	162 lb (73 kg)	2002-01-18	Syracuse, New York	Sacred Heart (AHA)	—
17	(United States)	Luke Levandowski	Sophomore	F	6' 0" (1.83 m)	165 lb (75 kg)	2002-09-26	Rosemount, Minnesota	Wisconsin Windigo (NAHL)	—
18	(United States)	Everett Pietila	Freshman	F	5' 10" (1.78 m)	185 lb (84 kg)	2003-09-27	Howell, Michigan	Wisconsin Windigo (NAHL)	—
19	(United States)	Joshua Wildauer	Graduate	F	5' 8" (1.73 m)	170 lb (77 kg)	1999-06-16	Dearborn Heights, Michigan	Coquitlam Express (BCHL)	—
20	(United States)	Grant Hindman (C)	Senior	D	6' 0" (1.83 m)	200 lb (91 kg)	2002-05-16	Oakland, Michigan	Youngstown Phantoms (USHL)	—
21	(United States)	Jordan Venegoni	Senior	F	6' 0" (1.83 m)	185 lb (84 kg)	2000-08-16	Livonia, Michigan	Amarillo Bulls (NAHL)	—
22	(Germany)	Timo Bakos	Senior	F	6' 1" (1.85 m)	194 lb (88 kg)	2000-07-28	Augsburg, Germany	Starbulls Rosenheim (Oberliga)	—
24	(Sweden)	William Ahlrik	Freshman	F	6' 0" (1.83 m)	190 lb (86 kg)	2003-09-25	Tidaholm, Sweden	Oklahoma Warriors (NAHL)	—
26	(Canada)	Cole Craft	Senior	F	6' 2" (1.88 m)	195 lb (88 kg)	2001-06-29	North Bay, Ontario	Lincoln Stars (USHL)	—
27	(United States)	Carter Batchelder	Sophomore	F	5' 10" (1.78 m)	175 lb (79 kg)	2003-02-25	Savage, Minnesota	Des Moines Buccaneers (USHL)	—
28	(Canada)	John Herrington	Sophomore	D	5' 11" (1.8 m)	180 lb (82 kg)	2002-04-19	Hudson's Hope, British Columbia	Prince George Spruce Kings (BCHL)	—
29	(United States)	Hadley Hudak	Freshman	F	6' 4" (1.93 m)	201 lb (91 kg)	2003-06-23	Canton, Michigan	Springfield Jr. Blues (NAHL)	—
30	(Canada)	Easton Hesse	Junior (RS)	G	6' 0" (1.83 m)	175 lb (79 kg)	2000-06-28	Beaumont, Alberta	Bonnyville Pontiacs (AJHL)	—
31	(United States)	Grant Riley	Sophomore (RS)	G	6' 4" (1.93 m)	200 lb (91 kg)	2002-08-28	Rochester, New York	Northeastern (HEA)	—
35	(United States)	Tyler Bute	Sophomore	G	5' 10" (1.78 m)	150 lb (68 kg)	2004-07-02	Winfield, Illinois	Lake Superior State (ACHA)	—

== Standings ==
2024–25 Central Collegiate Hockey Association standings
	Conference record											Overall record					
	GP	W	L	T	OTW	OTL	SW	PTS	PCT ^	GF	GA	GP	W	L	T	GF	GA
#14 Minnesota State †*	26	18	5	3	3	1	1	56	.718	77	37	39	27	9	3	113	58
Augustana	16	9	5	2	1	1	1	30	.625	48	37	35	18	13	4	97	75
St. Thomas	26	13	9	4	1	1	1	42	.564	76	66	38	19	14	5	111	101
Bowling Green	26	12	10	4	2	3	2	43	.551	69	63	36	18	14	4	90	85
Michigan Tech	26	12	11	3	1	1	1	40	.513	75	69	36	16	17	3	95	96
Ferris State	26	12	13	1	1	0	0	36	.462	74	81	36	13	20	3	89	128
Bemidji State	26	10	12	4	3	1	4	36	.462	63	78	38	15	18	5	93	114
Lake Superior State	26	10	15	1	0	4	0	35	.449	71	76	36	12	22	2	93	115
Northern Michigan	26	4	20	2	1	1	2	16	.205	42	88	34	5	27	2	55	115
Championship: March 21, 2025 † indicates conference regular-season champion (MacNaughton Cup) * indicates conference tournament champion (Mason Cup)^ Because Augustana played a transition schedule of 16 games against conference opponents, winning percentage was used to determine conference position. Rankings: USCHO.com Top 20 Poll

== Schedule and results ==
Date	Time	Opponent^{#}	Rank^{#}	Site	TV	Decision	Result	Attendance	Record
Regular Season
October 5	4:07 pm	#4 Michigan State*		Taffy Abel Arena • Sault Ste. Marie, Michigan	Midco Sports+	Applebee	L 1–2 ^{OT}	2,542	0–1–0
October 6	4:07 pm	#4 Michigan State*		Taffy Abel Arena • Sault Ste. Marie, Michigan	Midco Sports+	Hesse	L 1–5	1,847	0–2–0
October 11	7:00 pm	at USNTDP*		USA Hockey Arena • Plymouth, Michigan (Exhibition)		Applebee	W 6–1		
October 12	2:00 pm	vs. Simon Fraser*		USA Hockey Arena • Plymouth, Michigan (Exhibition)			W 4–1		
October 18	7:07 pm	Stonehill*		Taffy Abel Arena • Sault Ste. Marie, Michigan	Midco Sports+	Applebee	L 1–4	1,592	0–3–0
October 19	6:07 pm	Stonehill*		Taffy Abel Arena • Sault Ste. Marie, Michigan	Midco Sports+	Applebee	W 3–0	1,838	1–3–0
November 1	7:00 pm	at #15 Ohio State*		Value City Arena • Columbus, Ohio		Applebee	L 3–9	3,312	1–4–0
November 2	5:00 pm	at #15 Ohio State*		Value City Arena • Columbus, Ohio		Applebee	L 2–6	3,961	1–5–0
November 8	7:07 pm	at Northern Michigan		Berry Events Center • Marquette, Michigan	Midco Sports+	Applebee	W 5–0	2,569	2–5–0 (1–0–0)
November 9	6:07 pm	at Northern Michigan		Berry Events Center • Marquette, Michigan	Midco Sports+	Applebee	W 5–1	2,518	3–5–0 (2–0–0)
November 15	7:07 pm	Ferris State		Taffy Abel Arena • Sault Ste. Marie, Michigan	Midco Sports+	Applebee	W 4–2	—	4–5–0 (3–0–0)
November 16	6:07 pm	vs. Ferris State		Huntington Rink • Traverse City, Michigan (Superior Ice Showdown)	Midco Sports+	Applebee	L 2–3	1,800	4–6–0 (3–1–0)
November 23	10:07 pm	at Alaska Anchorage*		Avis Alaska Sports Complex • Anchorage, Alaska		Applebee	T 4–4 ^{OT}	636	4–6–1
November 24	9:07 pm	at Alaska Anchorage*		Avis Alaska Sports Complex • Anchorage, Alaska		Applebee	W 4–2	666	5–6–1
November 29	8:07 pm	at St. Thomas		St. Thomas Ice Arena • Mendota Heights, Minnesota	Midco Sports+	Applebee	W 4–2	715	6–6–1 (4–1–0)
November 30	7:07 pm	at St. Thomas		St. Thomas Ice Arena • Mendota Heights, Minnesota	Midco Sports+	Applebee	W 5–3	577	7–6–1 (5–1–0)
December 6	7:07 pm	Bemidji State		Taffy Abel Arena • Sault Ste. Marie, Michigan	Midco Sports+	Applebee	L 2–4	678	7–7–1 (5–2–0)
December 7	7:07 pm	Bemidji State		Taffy Abel Arena • Sault Ste. Marie, Michigan	Midco Sports+	Applebee	W 4–3	768	8–7–1 (6–2–0)
December 13	8:07 pm	at #12 Minnesota State		Mayo Clinic Health System Event Center • Mankato, Minnesota	Midco Sports+	Applebee	L 1–2	3,836	8–8–1 (6–3–0)
December 14	7:07 pm	at #12 Minnesota State		Mayo Clinic Health System Event Center • Mankato, Minnesota	Midco Sports+	Applebee	L 2–3 ^{OT}	3,863	8–9–1 (6–4–0)
January 3	7:07 pm	Bowling Green		Taffy Abel Arena • Sault Ste. Marie, Michigan	Midco Sports+	Applebee	L 0–3	367	8–10–1 (6–5–0)
January 4	7:07 pm	Bowling Green		Taffy Abel Arena • Sault Ste. Marie, Michigan	Midco Sports+	Applebee	L 1–3	456	8–11–1 (6–6–0)
January 10	7:07 pm	at Michigan Tech		MacInnes Student Ice Arena • Houghton, Michigan	Midco Sports+	Applebee	W 4–2	3,096	9–11–1 (7–6–0)
January 11	6:07 pm	at Michigan Tech		MacInnes Student Ice Arena • Houghton, Michigan	Midco Sports+	Applebee	L 0–1	3,373	9–12–1 (7–7–0)
January 17	7:07 pm	St. Thomas		Taffy Abel Arena • Sault Ste. Marie, Michigan	Midco Sports+	Applebee	L 3–4 ^{OT}	1,234	9–13–1 (7–8–0)
January 18	6:07 pm	St. Thomas		Taffy Abel Arena • Sault Ste. Marie, Michigan	Midco Sports+	Hesse	T 3–3 ^{SOL}	—	9–13–2 (7–8–1)
January 31	8:07 pm	at #19 Augustana		Midco Arena • Sioux Falls, South Dakota	Midco Sports+	Applebee	L 3–6	2,866	9–14–2 (7–9–1)
February 1	7:07 pm	at #19 Augustana		Midco Arena • Sioux Falls, South Dakota	Midco Sports+	Applebee	L 3–4	3,006	9–15–2 (7–10–1)
February 7	7:07 pm	Northern Michigan		Taffy Abel Arena • Sault Ste. Marie, Michigan	Midco Sports+	Hesse	W 3–2	—	10–15–2 (8–10–1)
February 8	6:07 pm	Northern Michigan		Taffy Abel Arena • Sault Ste. Marie, Michigan	Midco Sports+	Applebee	L 2–3 ^{OT}	—	10–16–2 (8–11–1)
February 14	7:07 pm	at Ferris State		Ewigleben Arena • Big Rapids, Michigan	Midco Sports+	Applebee	L 2–3 ^{OT}	1,818	10–17–2 (8–12–1)
February 15	6:07 pm	at Ferris State		Ewigleben Arena • Big Rapids, Michigan	Midco Sports+	Hesse	W 5–3	2,031	11–17–2 (9–12–1)
February 21	7:07 pm	#15 Minnesota State		Taffy Abel Arena • Sault Ste. Marie, Michigan	Midco Sports+	Hesse	L 0–4	892	11–18–2 (9–13–1)
February 22	6:07 pm	#15 Minnesota State		Taffy Abel Arena • Sault Ste. Marie, Michigan	Midco Sports+	Applebee	L 1–4	—	11–19–2 (9–14–1)
February 28	7:07 pm	at Bowling Green		Slater Family Ice Arena • Bowling Green, Ohio	Midco Sports+	Applebee	W 4–3	2,232	12–19–2 (10–14–1)
March 1	6:07 pm	at Bowling Green		Slater Family Ice Arena • Bowling Green, Ohio	Midco Sports+	Applebee	L 3–5	2,616	12–20–2 (10–15–1)
CCHA Tournament
March 7	8:07 pm	at #14 Minnesota State*		Mayo Clinic Health System Event Center • Mankato, Minnesota (CCHA Quarterfinal Game 1)	Midco Sports+	Applebee	L 1–4	—	12–21–2
March 8	7:07 pm	at #14 Minnesota State*		Mayo Clinic Health System Event Center • Mankato, Minnesota (CCHA Quarterfinal Game 2)	Midco Sports+	Applebee	L 2–3	3,627	12–22–2
*Non-conference game. ^{#}Rankings from USCHO.com Poll. All times are in Eastern Time. Source:

== Scoring statistics ==
Name	Position	Games	Goals	Assists	Points	PIM
Connor Millburn	F	28	9	14	23	14
Timo Bakos	F	34	10	12	22	6
Sasha Teleguine	F	32	14	5	19	34
John Herrington	C	36	4	14	18	18
Nate Schweitzer	D	34	3	15	18	42
Dawson Tritt	F	33	7	10	17	33
Branden Piku	F	34	9	7	16	24
Luke Levandowski	F	34	5	9	14	4
Evan Bushy	D	33	0	14	14	8
Reagan Milburn	F	24	7	5	12	18
William Ahlrik	C	35	6	6	12	24
John Druskinis	D	36	4	7	11	30
Jacob Conrad	D	28	6	4	10	4
Jordan Venegoni	F	28	0	9	9	6
Blake Humphrey	C	30	2	6	8	2
Carter Batchelder	C	26	3	4	7	10
Grant Hindman	D	36	3	3	6	30
Bryan Huggins	D	32	1	4	5	12
Everett Pietila	F	25	0	5	5	10
Wilson Dahlheimer	F	20	0	3	3	2
Mike Brown	D	30	0	2	2	47
Easton Hesse	G	6	0	1	1	0
Adam Barone	D	17	0	1	1	4
Tyler Bute	G	1	0	0	0	0
Grant Riley	G	1	0	0	0	0
Jack Blanchett	D	6	0	0	0	6
Joshua Wildauer	C	7	0	0	0	2
Hadley Hudak	F	8	0	0	0	4
Rorke Applebee	G	31	0	0	0	2
Total			93	160	253	410

== Goaltending statistics ==
Name	Games	Minutes	Wins	Losses	Ties	Goals Against	Saves	Shut Outs	SV %	GAA
Rorke Applebee	32	1840:33	10	19	1	92	898	2	.907	3.00
Easton Hesse	5	302:23	2	2	1	16	190	0	.922	3.17
Grant Riley	2	14:27	0	1	0	1	9	0	.900	4.15
Empty Net	-	19:23	-	-	-	6	-	-	-	-
Total	36	2176:46	12	22	2	115	1097	2	.905	3.17

== Rankings ==
Poll	Week																											
Poll	Pre	1	2	3	4	5	6	7	8	9	10	11	12	13	14	15	16	17	18	19	20	21	22	23	24	25	26	27 (Final)
USCHO.com	NR	NR	NR	NR	NR	NR	NR	NR	NR	NR	NR	NR	–	NR	NR	NR	NR	NR	NR	NR	NR	NR	NR	NR	NR	NR	–	NR
USA Hockey	NR	NR	NR	NR	NR	NR	NR	NR	NR	NR	NR	NR	–	NR	NR	NR	NR	NR	NR	NR	NR	NR	NR	NR	NR	NR	NR	NR

Note: USCHO did not release a poll in week 12 or 26.
Note: USA Hockey did not release a poll in week 12.

== Awards and honors ==
Player	Award	Ref
Rorke Applebee	CCHA All-Rookie Team	
