= Watershed Center Grand Traverse Bay =

U.S. nonprofit organization

The Watershed Center Grand Traverse Bay was founded in 1990. This non-profit organization advocates for clean water in Grand Traverse Bay and protects and preserves the Bay's watershed.

This environmental organization's work encompasses Leelanau County, Grand Traverse County, Antrim County and Kalkaska County in Michigan. The group is based in Traverse City.
