= Park Place Hotel =

Historical American hotel

Coordinates: 44°45′44.9″N 85°37′04.9″W

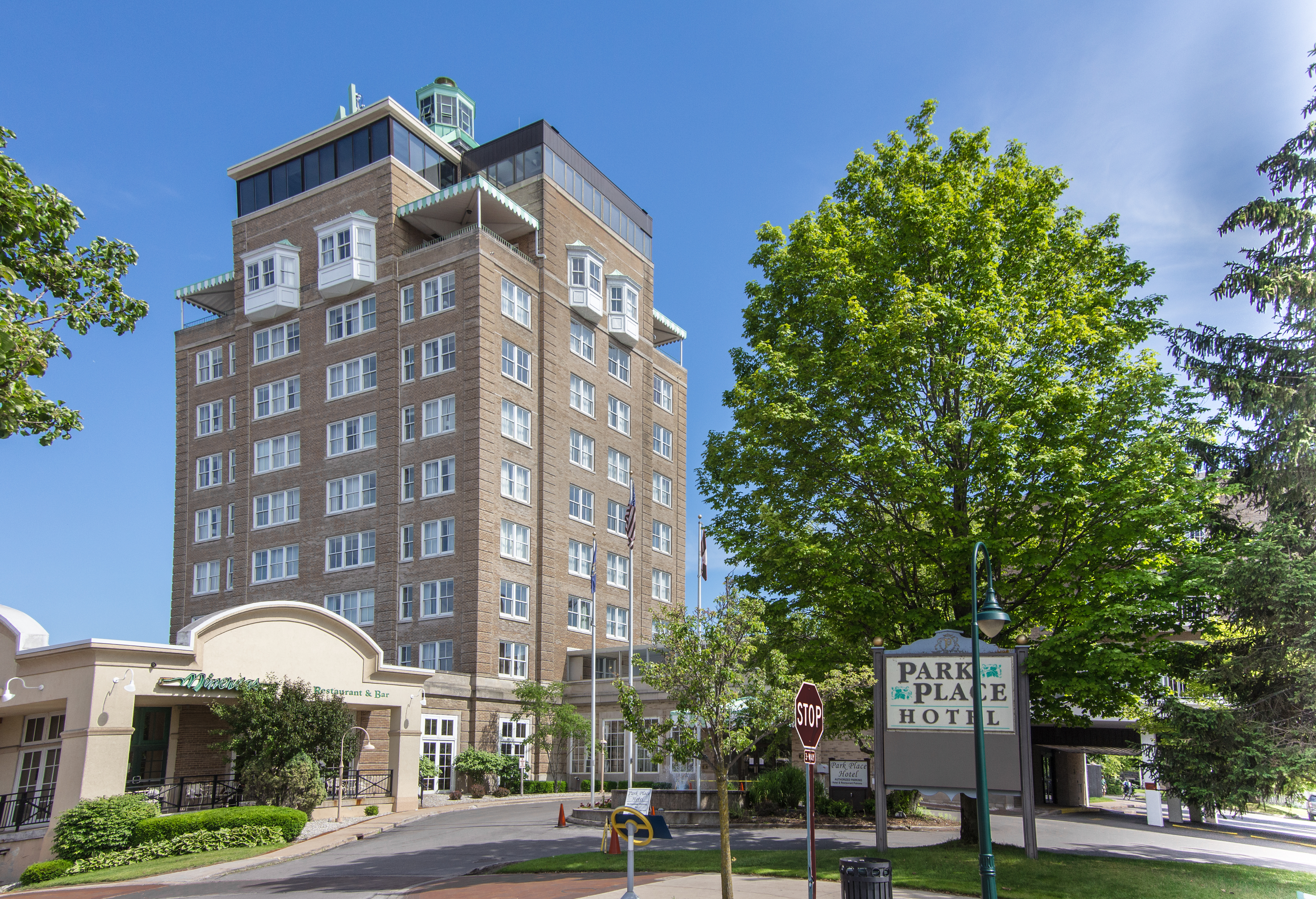
Park Place Hotel

Park Place Hotel is a historic hotel in Traverse City, Michigan. Completed in 1930 by Benjamin H. Marshall, the 10-story building rises to a height of 125 feet (38 m) and is the tallest structure in the city.

== History ==
Park Place replaced a previous hotel, the Campbell House, which was built in 1873. In 1960s, when Traverse City officials determined the need for a convention center, the Park Place Dome was added to the hotel. The roof of the structure was considered the first of its kind—according to Paul Hazelton, it was the first time plastic was used as a "structural form rather than as a cover supported by some other material".
