= Traverse City, Michigan =

City in Michigan

- City
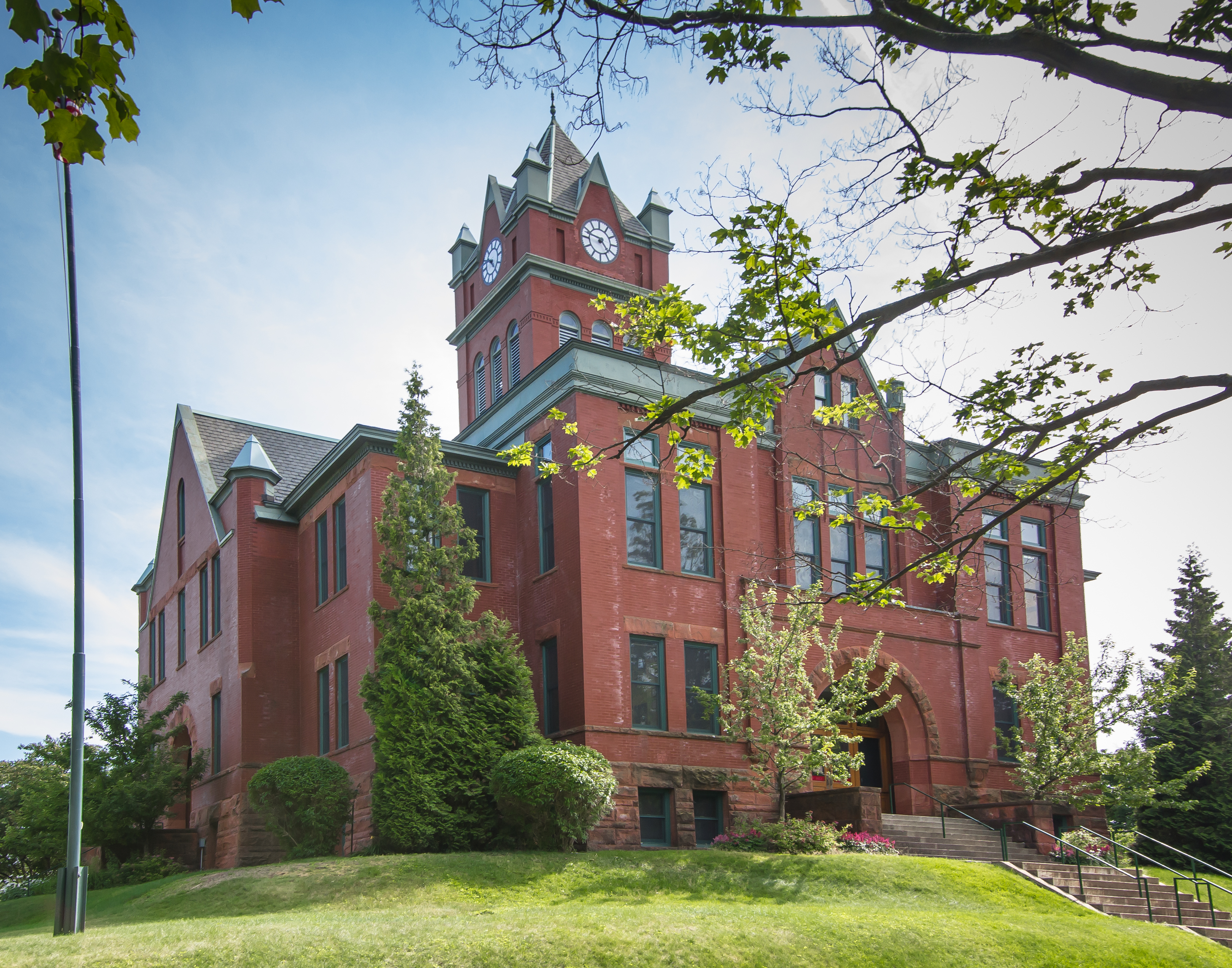
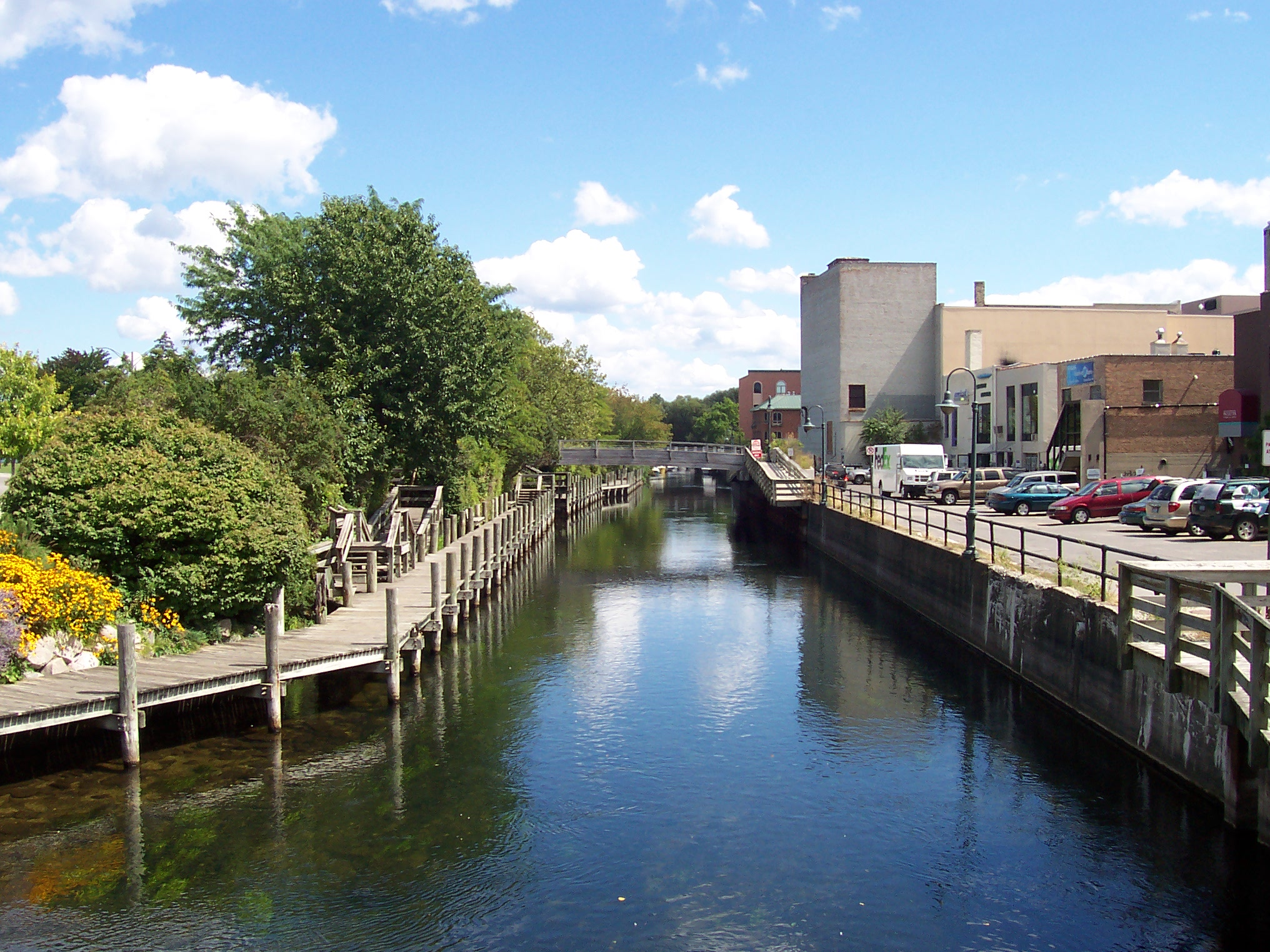
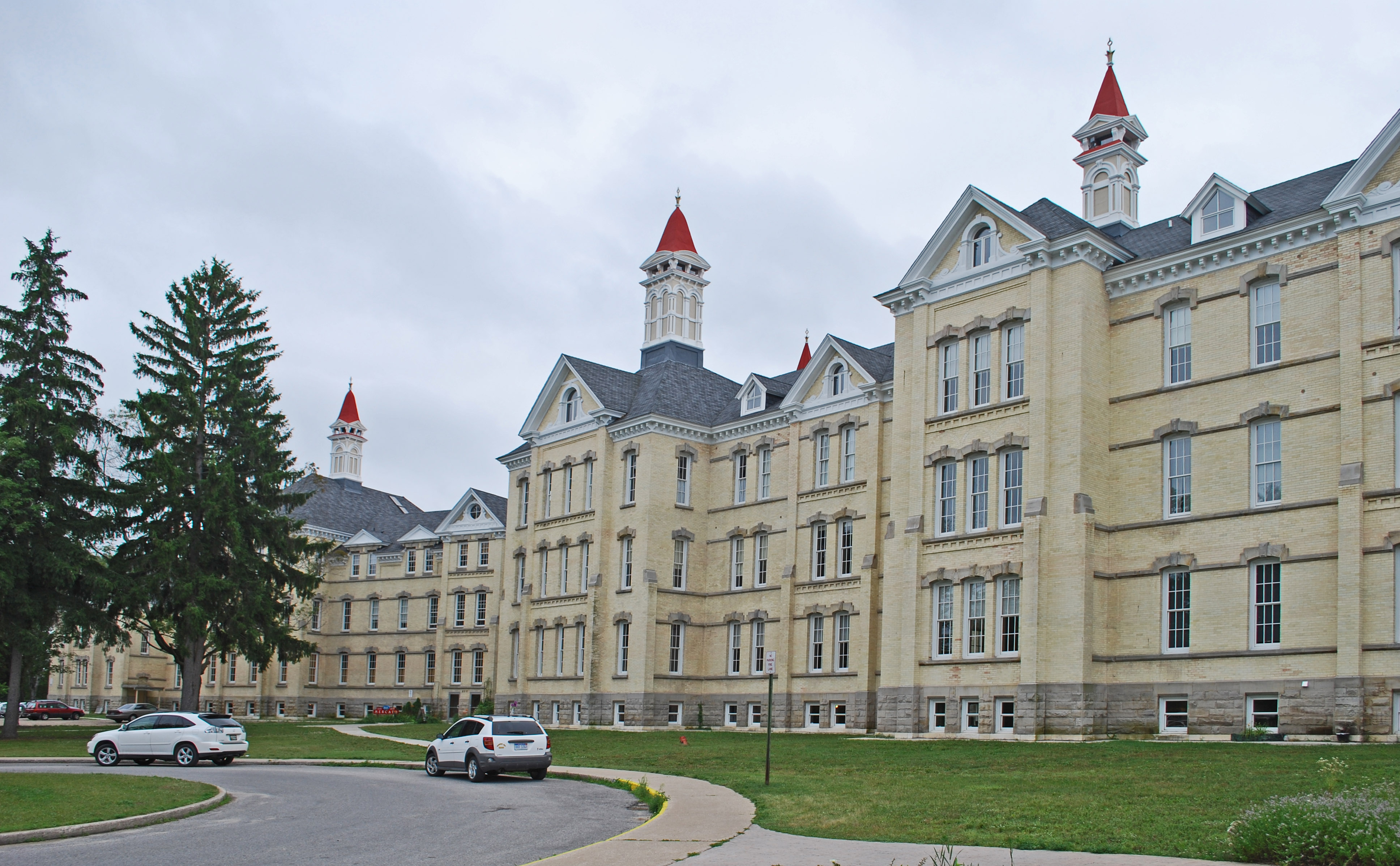
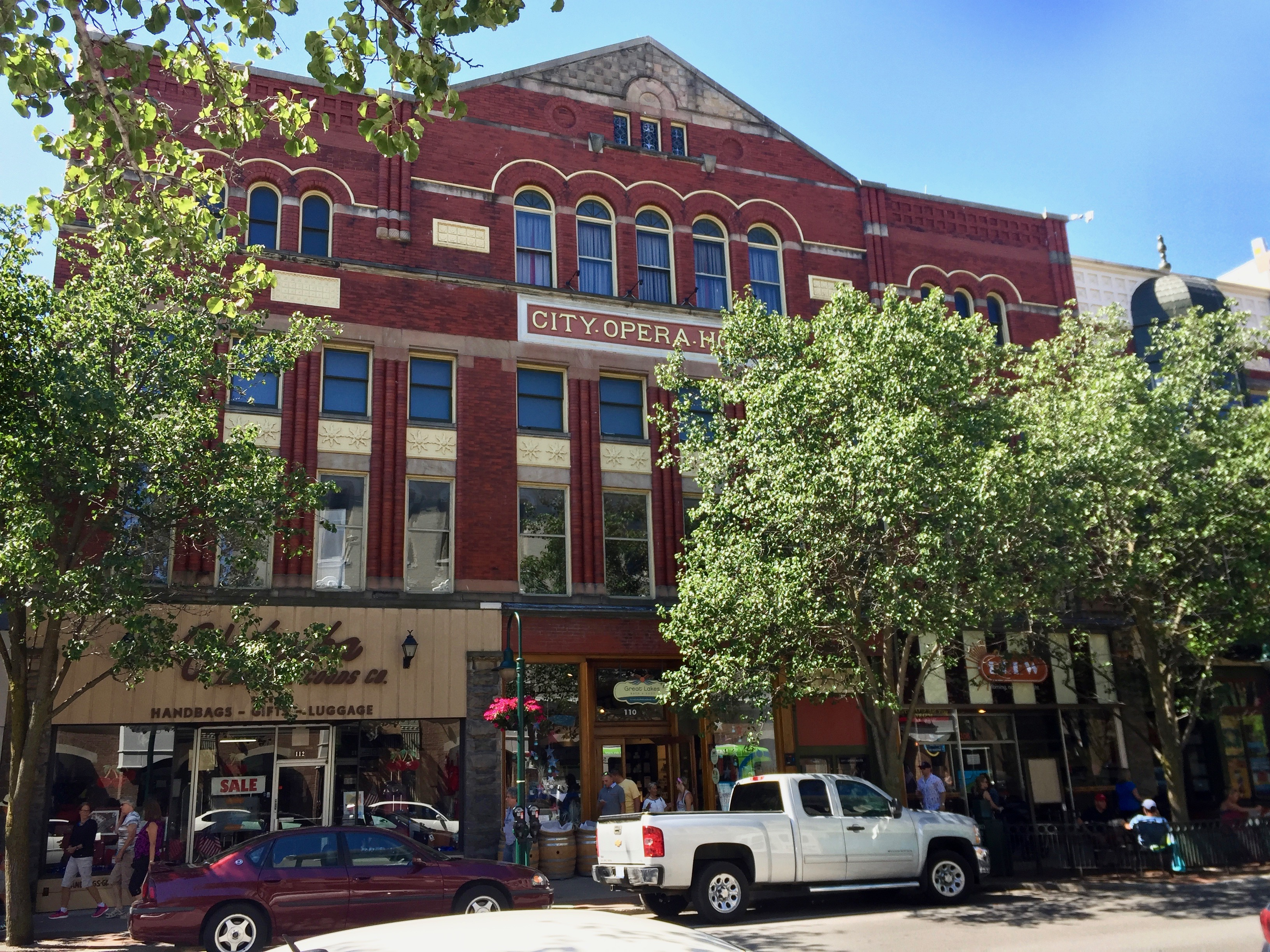
- Downtown Traverse City Grand Traverse County Courthouse Boardman River Traverse City State Hospital City Opera House

- Flag Seal Logo
- Etymology: French: la grande traverse (the long crossing)
- Nicknames: "Traverse", "T.C.", "The Cherry Capital (of the World)", "Cherryland", "Queen City of the North", "Traffic City", "Coast Guard City", "Hockeytown North"
- Interactive map of Traverse City, Michigan
- Location within Michigan Location within the United States Location within North America
- Coordinates: 44°46′05″N 85°37′20″W
- Country: United States
- State: Michigan
- Counties: Grand Traverse; Leelanau
- Settled: June 13, 1847; 179 years ago
- Incorporated: April 18, 1881 (village); May 18, 1895 (city)
- Founder: Perry Hannah, Albert Lay, Horace Boardman

Government
  - Type: Council–manager
  - Mayor: Amy Shamroe (D)
  - City manager: Benjamin Marentette

Area
  - City: 8.61 sq mi (22.30 km^{2})
  - Land: 8.27 sq mi (21.43 km^{2})
  - Water: 0.34 sq mi (0.87 km^{2})
  - Urban: 52.4 sq mi (135.8 km^{2})
  - Metro: 1,690 sq mi (4,380 km^{2})
- Elevation: 627 ft (191 m)

Population (2020)
  - City: 15,678
  - Estimate (2025): 15,832 ▲
  - Density: 1,894.4/sq mi (731.43/km^{2})
  - Urban: 56,890
  - Urban density: 1,085/sq mi (419.1/km^{2})
  - Metro: 153,448 (Traverse City metropolitan area)
- Demonym: "Traverse Citian(s)"
- Time zone: UTC−5 (EST)
  - Summer (DST): UTC−4 (EDT)
- ZIP Code: 49684, 49685, 49686, 49696
- Area code: 231
- FIPS code: 26-80340
- GNIS feature ID: 1615042
- Website: traversecitymi.gov

Traverse City (/ˈtrævərs/ TRAV-ərss) is a city in the U.S. state of Michigan. It is the county seat of Grand Traverse County, although it partly extends into Leelanau County. The city's population was 15,678 at the 2020 census, while the four-county Traverse City metropolitan area had 153,448 residents. Traverse City is the largest city in Northern Michigan.

Traverse City is at the head of the East and West arms of Grand Traverse Bay, a 32-mile-long (51 km) bay of Lake Michigan. Grand Traverse Bay is divided into arms by the 18-mile-long (29 km) Old Mission Peninsula, which is attached at its base to Traverse City. The city borders four townships–East Bay, Elmwood, Garfield, and Peninsula–all of which are primarily suburban.

Traverse City is nicknamed "the Cherry Capital of the World", as the area surrounding Grand Traverse Bay is a hotspot for cherry production. The city hosts the National Cherry Festival, attracting approximately 500,000 visitors annually. The Traverse City area is also known for its wine production. Two American Viticultural Areas are adjacent to the city. The city is also home to the Traverse City State Hospital, a former state psychiatric institution, and Coast Guard Air Station Traverse City.

== History ==
=== Early history ===
Prior to European settlement, what is now Traverse City was part of the territory of the Council of Three Fires, an alliance of three Anishinaabe tribes, the Odawa, Ojibwe, and Potawatomi. The Odawa, who were particularly prevalent in the area, called the area Kitchiwikwedongsing, (Note: Ottawa pronunciation: [kːʰɪtːʰt͡ʃːɪwɪkːʰweːdʊnksɪnk]) a name which was often shortened to Wequetong, (Note: Ottawa pronunciation: [weːkːʰeːtːʰʊnk]) meaning "place at the head of the great bay". The area was the northern end of what is today known as the Old Indian Trail, a trail which serviced travel for the Hopewell, and later the Anishinaabe, coming to and from the Cadillac area.

Grand Traverse Bay was named by 18th-century French voyageurs who made la grande traverse, (Note: In modern standard French, traverse no longer has the sense of 'crossing'—which is now traversée.) or "the long crossing", across the mouth of the bay, from present-day Norwood to Northport. The area was French territory at first, and then part of the Kingdom of Great Britain as the Province of Quebec. The area was ceded to the United States in 1783 following the Treaty of Paris, becoming part of the Northwest Territory.

In 1847, Captain Horace Boardman of Naperville, Illinois, purchased the land at the mouth of the Boardman River (then known as the Ottawa River) at the head of the west arm of the bay, which at the time was still inhabited by Native Americans. The captain, his son, and their employees first sailed into the river on June 13, 1847, and later built a dwelling and sawmill near the mouth of the river. In 1851, the Boardmans sold the sawmill to Hannah, Lay & Co (made up of Perry Hannah, Albert Tracy Lay and James Morgan), who improved the mill greatly. The increased investment in the mill attracted additional settlers to the new community. Perry Hannah today is known as the founding father of Traverse City.

Traverse City was originally part of Omeena County, which was originally set off in 1840 from Michilimackinac County. The county remained unorganized, lacking a central government until 1851, when it was reorganized as Grand Traverse County. The newly designated county government was assigned a county seat at Boardman's Mills, a location in present-day downtown Traverse City.

=== Late 19th century ===
As of 1853, the only operating post office in the Grand Traverse Bay region was the one located at Old Mission, which was then known as "Grand Traverse". While in Washington, D.C. in 1852, Mr. Lay had succeeded in getting the U.S. Post Office to authorize a new post office at his newer settlement. As the newer settlement had become known as "Grand Traverse City", after the Grand Traverse Bay, Lay proposed this name for its post office, but the Post Office Department clerk suggested dropping the "Grand" from the name, to limit confusion between this new office and the one at nearby Old Mission. Mr. Lay agreed to the shortened name of Traverse City for the post office, and the village took on this name. Around this time, the first cherry trees were being planted on the Old Mission Peninsula, for which the peninsula is widely known today.

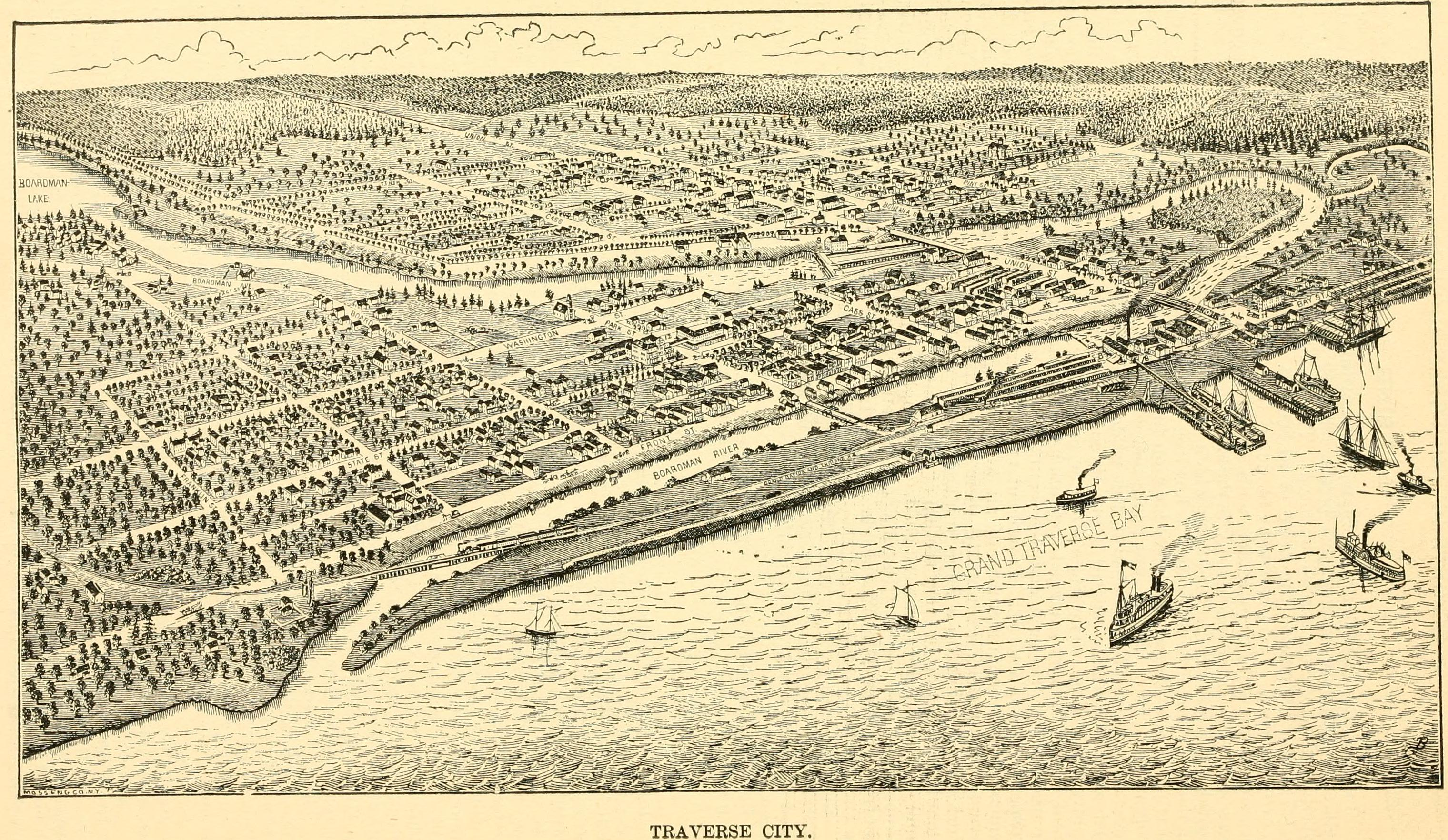
1883 illustration of Traverse City

In December 1872, rail service arrived in Traverse City via a Traverse City Railroad Company spur from the Grand Rapids and Indiana Railroad line at Walton Junction. The railroad tracked along the Boardman River and along Boardman Lake into Traverse City, and ended at a station along the Grand Traverse Bay, at the corner of present-day Grandview Parkway and Park Street. This new line of transportation from Southern Michigan opened up the area to settlement and industrial development. Many more people started flocking to the small community, and in 1881, Traverse City was incorporated as a village. This began the major commercial growth of the town.

In 1890, another rail line was extended to Traverse City, this one from Baldwin via Copemish and Interlochen. This line primarily served lumber companies, such as the Buckley & Douglas Lumber Company, and was used to transport logs from the vast forest of Northwest Michigan to sawmills in Manistee and Traverse City. Two years later, new railroads were extended out of Traverse City. One line was extended along the bay into Leelanau County, and curved south to a preexisting spur at Lake Ann. Another line was extended east into present-day Williamsburg, and to Charlevoix and Petoskey. This railroad was largely to serve tourists.

In 1881, the Northern Michigan Asylum, later the Traverse City State Hospital, was established as the demand for a third psychiatric hospital in Michigan, in addition to those established in Kalamazoo and Pontiac, began to grow. Perry Hannah, by then a prominent Michigan Republican, used his political influence to secure its location in Traverse City. Under the supervision of prominent architect Gordon W. Lloyd, the first building, known as Building 50, was constructed in Victorian–Italianate style according to the Kirkbride Plan. The hospital opened in 1885 with 43 residents. Under Dr. James Decker Munson, the first superintendent from 1885 to 1924, the institution expanded. Twelve housing cottages and two infirmaries were built between 1887 and 1903 to meet the specific needs of male and female patients. The institution became the city's largest employer and contributed to its growth. While the hospital was established for the care of the mentally ill, its use expanded during outbreaks of tuberculosis, typhoid, diphtheria, influenza, and polio. It also cared for the elderly, served as a rehab for drug addicts, and was used to train nurses.

On May 18, 1895, Traverse City was incorporated as a city. Perry Hannah served as the first mayor of Traverse City, after also serving as first and third village president.

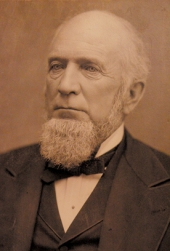
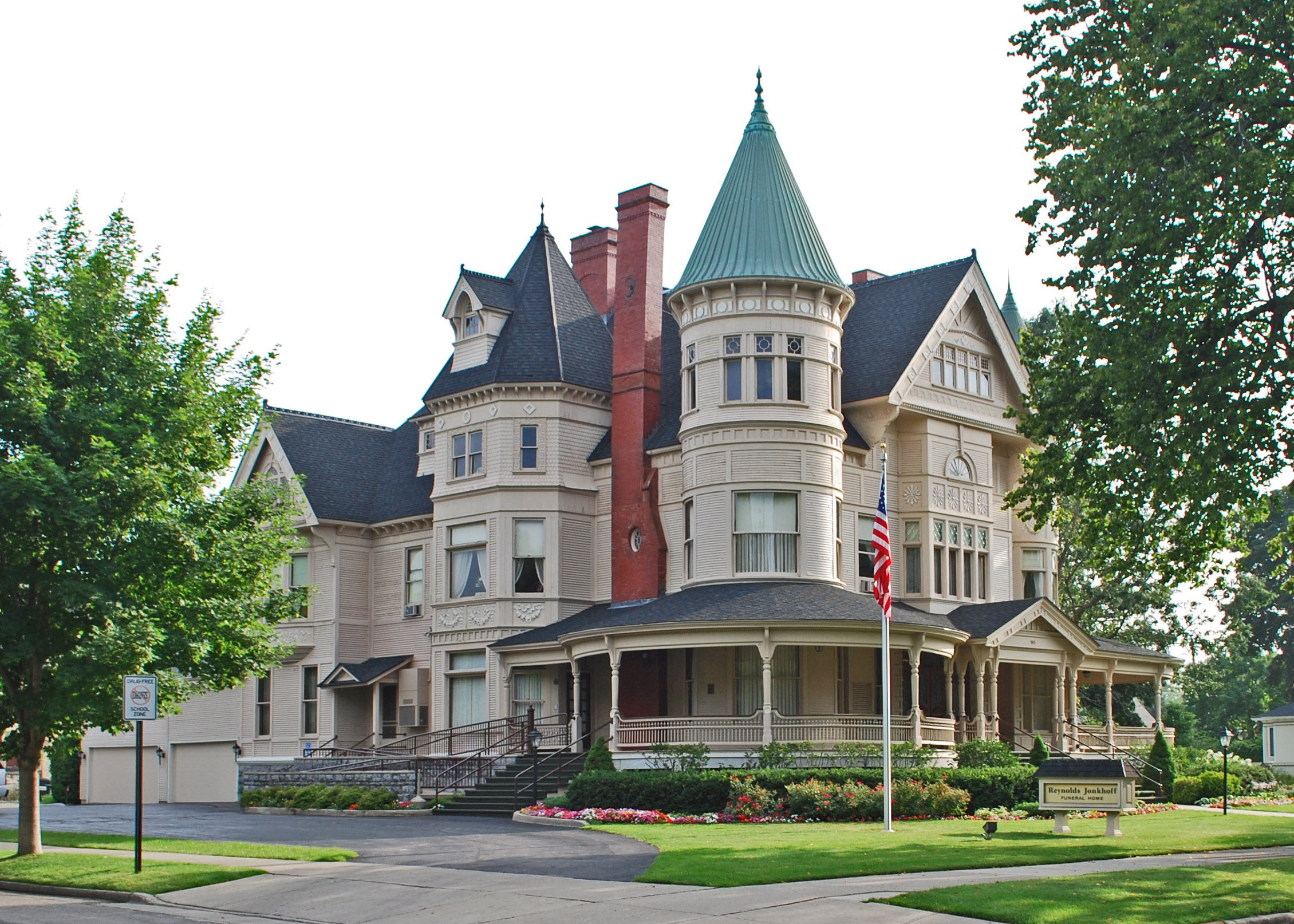
Perry Hannah, nicknamed the "father of Traverse City", and his 1893 mansion in the Central Neighborhood of Traverse City.

=== 20th century ===
Parade for the 100th anniversary of Traverse City's founding in 1949

The first National Cherry Festival was held in Traverse City in 1925. It was first called "Blessing of the Blossoms" and held in the spring to attract people during the blooming season. With the exception of the years surrounding World War II, as well as during the 2020 COVID-19 lockdowns, the city has held this festival annually. The legislature moved the date of the festival to the summer, and it attracts tourists from around the state and across the country. During the week the festival takes place, the population of Traverse City rises from about 15,000 to about 500,000. In 2004, the legislature added "Blossom Days", again as a spring festival.

Also in 1925, Munson Medical Center opened, and has since grown to serve much of Northern Michigan and serves as one of Traverse City's largest employers.

In 1929, Traverse City's first airport, Ransom Field, opened, offering flights to Grand Rapids. It closed in 1936, when the new Traverse City Airport (now called Cherry Capital Airport) was opened. In 1953, the grounds of Ransom Field were redeveloped as Memorial Gardens Cemetery.

In 1934, the original Traverse City High School building burnt down, with no casualties. For three years, while the high school was being rebuilt, classes were moved to the Perry Hannah House, the former residence of the city's founder. Classes were moved back to the new school building in September 1937. In 1960, the high school was moved from downtown Traverse City to a new college-style campus on the grounds of Northwestern Michigan College, which opened a few years prior in 1951. The former high school building was converted to Traverse City Junior High (now Central Grade School). In 1997, the high school split into Traverse City Central and Traverse City West High Schools due to extreme overcrowding at the 1960s building.

In 1989, the Traverse City State Hospital closed, leaving hundreds without jobs, massive abandoned buildings, and many homeless former patients. Since 2000, the Minervini Group has undertaken the project of renovating the entire property into a social center, including many restaurants, retail spaces, office space, and residential space.

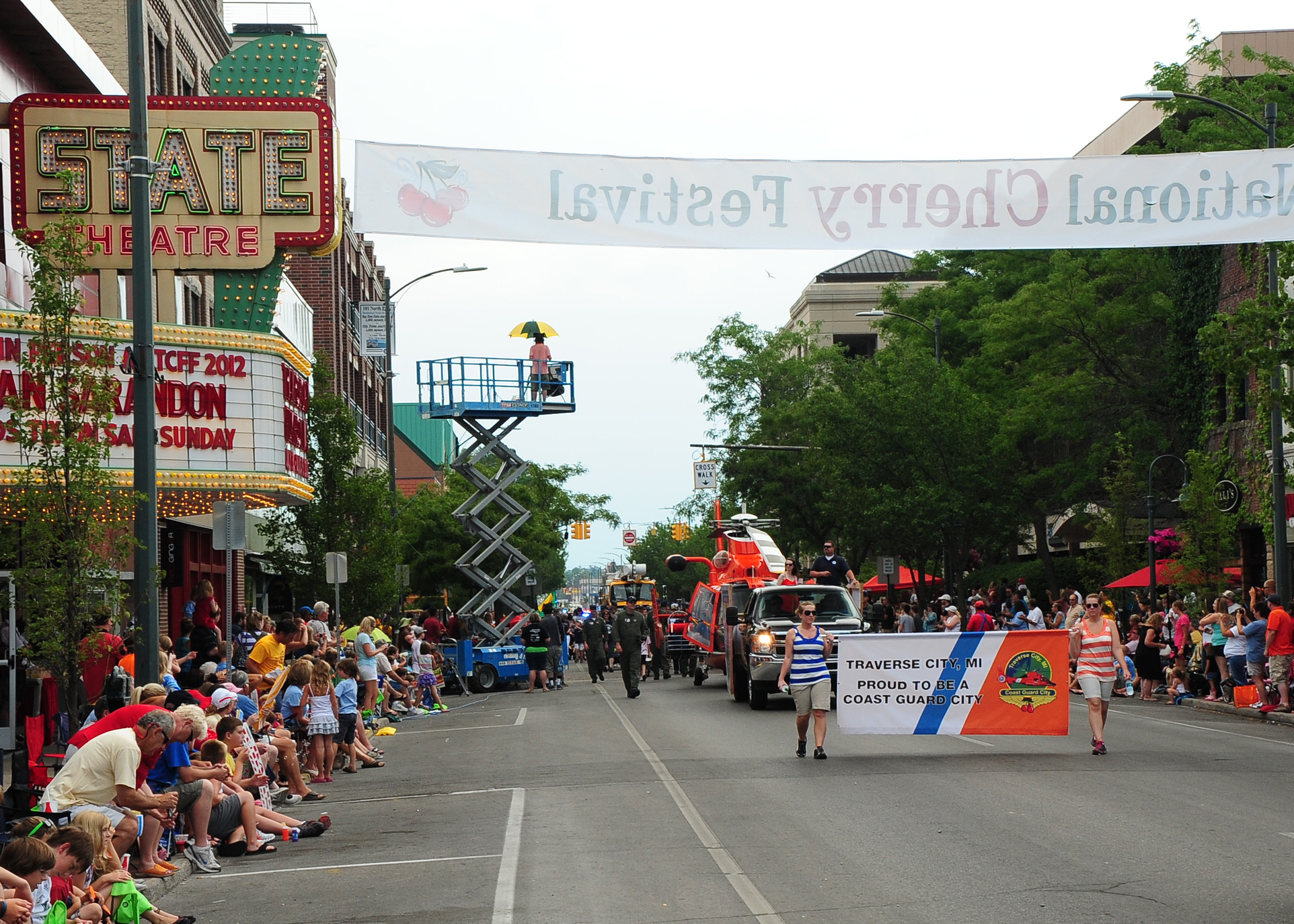
The National Cherry Festival's annual parade on East Front Street in 2012.

=== 21st century ===
On November 3, 2015, Traverse City elected Jim Carruthers, its first openly gay mayor. After serving as mayor of Traverse City for six years, in June 2021 Jim Carruthers announced he would not run for his fourth mayoral term.

May 18, 2020, served as the city's 125th anniversary of Traverse City's incorporation as a city in 1895, and was known as the "quarantine quasquicentennial".

In April 2021, a group composed mostly of White students from two Traverse City high schools held an online mock slave auction via social media app in a private group chat titled "Slave Trade", wherein they traded their Black student peers for monetary amounts while using derogatory language. After the local community was made aware of this event, a coalition of community members and Traverse City Area Public School (TCAPS) Board of Education officials drafted in response a resolution which denounced the behavior. The draft of the resolution itself led to community backlash initiated largely by conservative parents and community members who regarded the planned resolution to be "...interlaced with critical race theory". In the aftermath of the backlash, the resolution was edited by TCAPS school board officials. No date for consideration of the revised resolution has been set.

On July 26, 2025, a mass stabbing attack was committed at a Walmart store just south of Traverse City in Garfield Township, leaving eleven injured.

== Geography ==
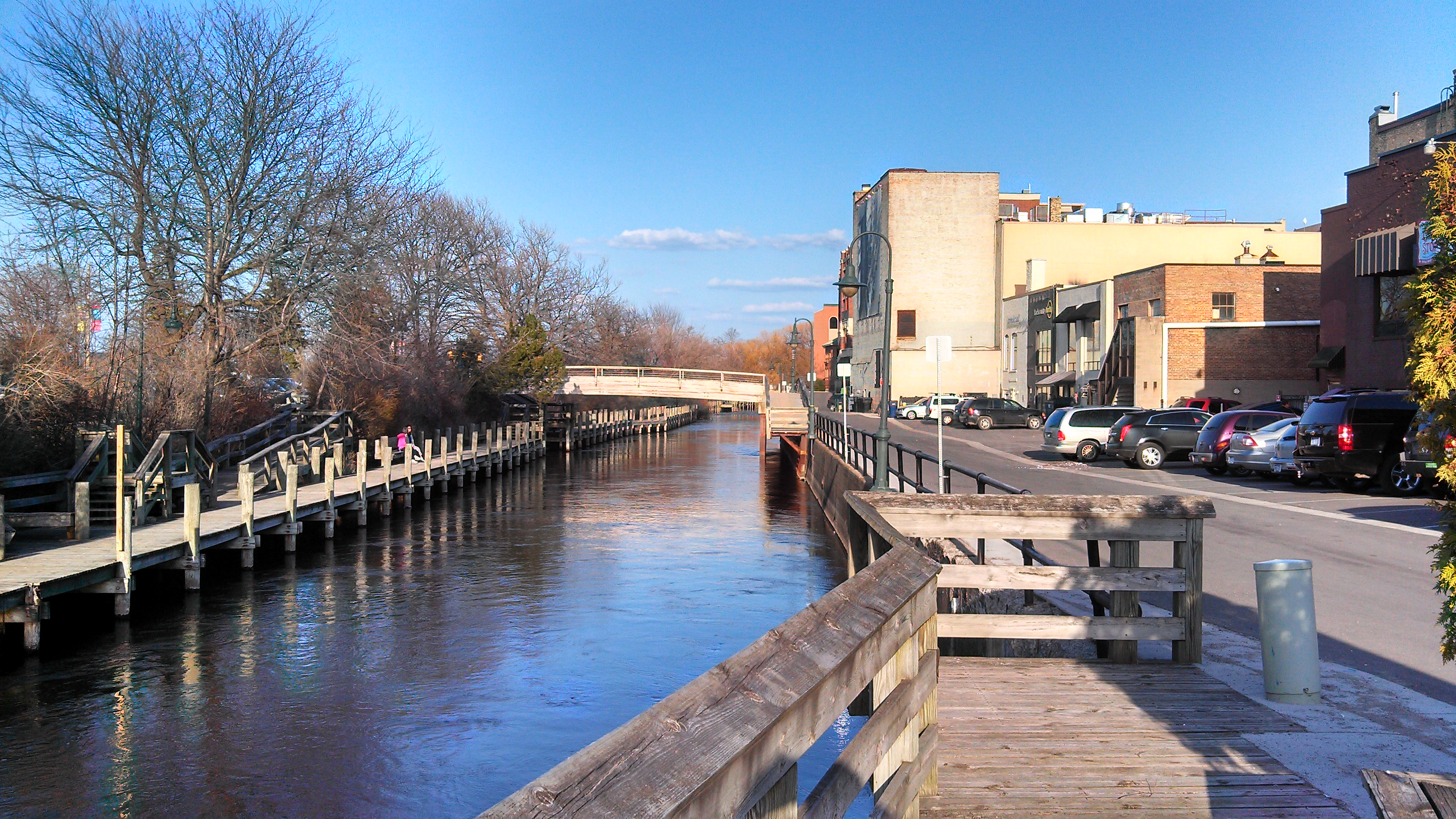
Boardman River near Cass Street in downtown Traverse City facing east to where it empties into Grand Traverse Bay

According to the United States Census Bureau, Traverse City has a total area of 8.66 square miles (22.43 km^{2}), of which, 8.33 square miles (21.57 km^{2}) are land and 0.33 square miles (0.85 km^{2}) is water. Most of the city is located within Grand Traverse County, though a small portion of the city extends northwesterly into Leelanau County. This portion, the Morgan Farms neighborhood, was annexed by the city in 1989.

Traverse City is located in the northwest of Michigan's Lower Peninsula, and is the core city of the Traverse City metropolitan area, the largest population center in Northern Michigan and the largest statistical area in the state north of the Tri-Cities.

The city is located at the head of Grand Traverse Bay, a long, natural harbor separated from the waters of Lake Michigan by the Leelanau Peninsula. The bay is divided into an East Arm and West Arm by the Old Mission Peninsula, a thin strip of rolling hills and farmland known for its cherry crop and viticulture industry. As Traverse City contains shores on both of Grand Traverse Bay's East and West Arms, one cannot access the Old Mission Peninsula without entering Traverse City.

The Boardman River bisects Traverse City, flowing from south to north. It snakes through Traverse City's downtown district, effectively forming a peninsula, and dividing it from the Grandview Parkway. The river terminates at Grand Traverse Bay northeast of downtown Traverse City. The river's 287-square-mile (740 km^{2}) watershed contributes one-third of the water volume to the bay and is one of Michigan's top-ten fisheries, with more than 36 miles (58 km) of its 179 miles (288 km) designated as a Blue Ribbon trout fishery. It is also a state-designated "Natural River". As of 2025, only one of the five dams constructed on the Boardman River remains; the last, the Union Street Dam, is, as of 2025, being converted into FishPass, a facility that will allow for native fish to move upstream while blocking invasives.

Traverse City is surrounded by a substantial suburban ring, particularly within Garfield Township, to its southwest. Garfield Township is the largest municipality in Northern Michigan by population. Other adjacent townships, East Bay, Elmwood, and Peninsula, and nearby Blair and Long Lake townships, boast significant suburban populations dependent upon Traverse City.

Sleeping Bear Dunes National Lakeshore, a federally protected sand dune on Lake Michigan, is located about 20 miles (32 km) west-northwest of Traverse City, in southwestern Leelanau County. Traverse City has one superfund site, according to the Environmental Protection Agency. This is the Avenue E Groundwater Contamination Site. At this location, toxic runoff from the Coast Guard Air Station contaminated the groundwater along Avenue E.

Traverse City is laid out primarily in a grid plan, with major streets running east–west and north–south. The city's tallest building, at 10 stories, is the Park Place Hotel.

=== Neighborhoods and districts ===
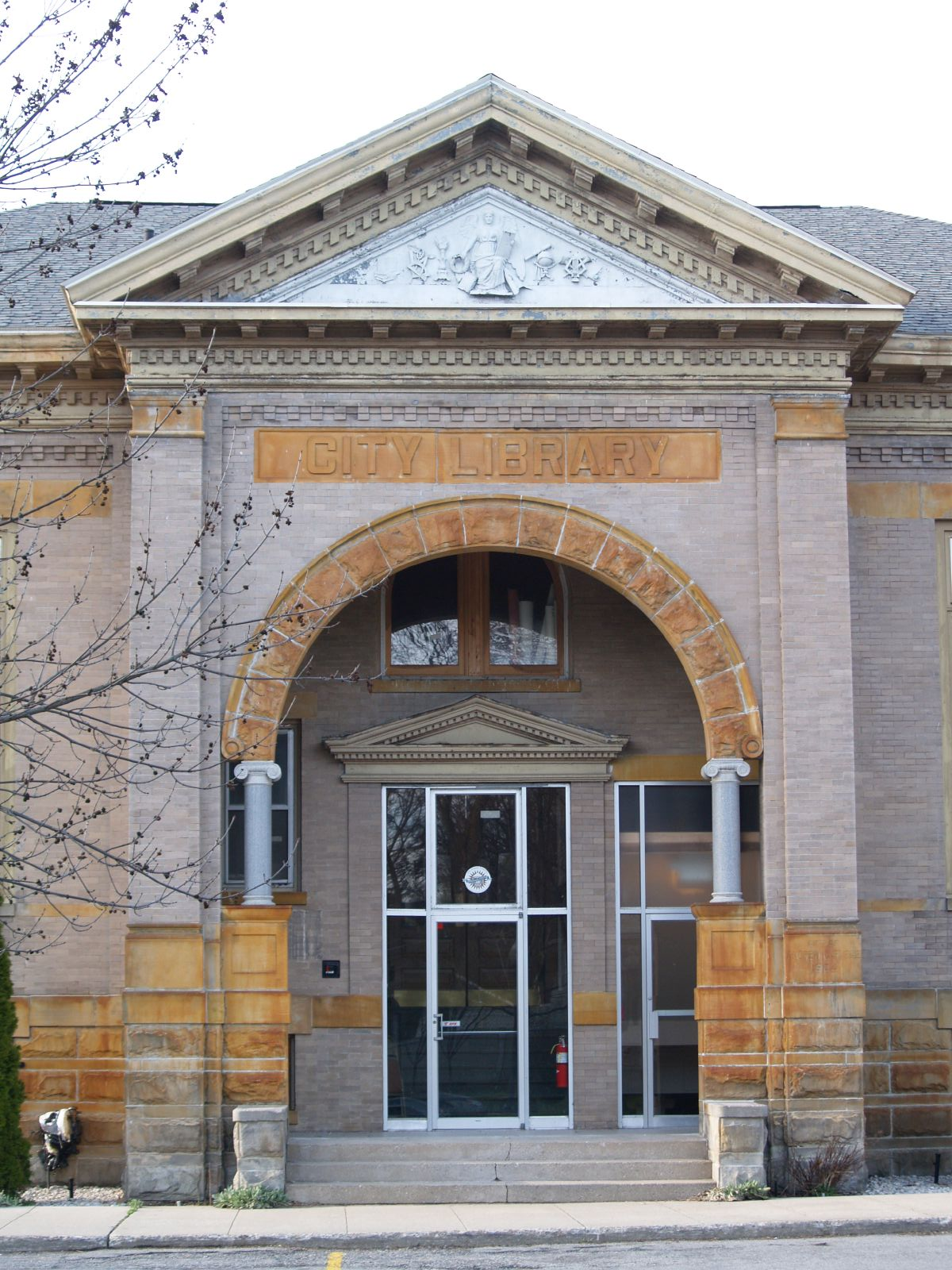
The Grand Traverse Heritage Center (formerly known as Carnegie Library), on Sixth Street in the Old Towne Neighborhood.

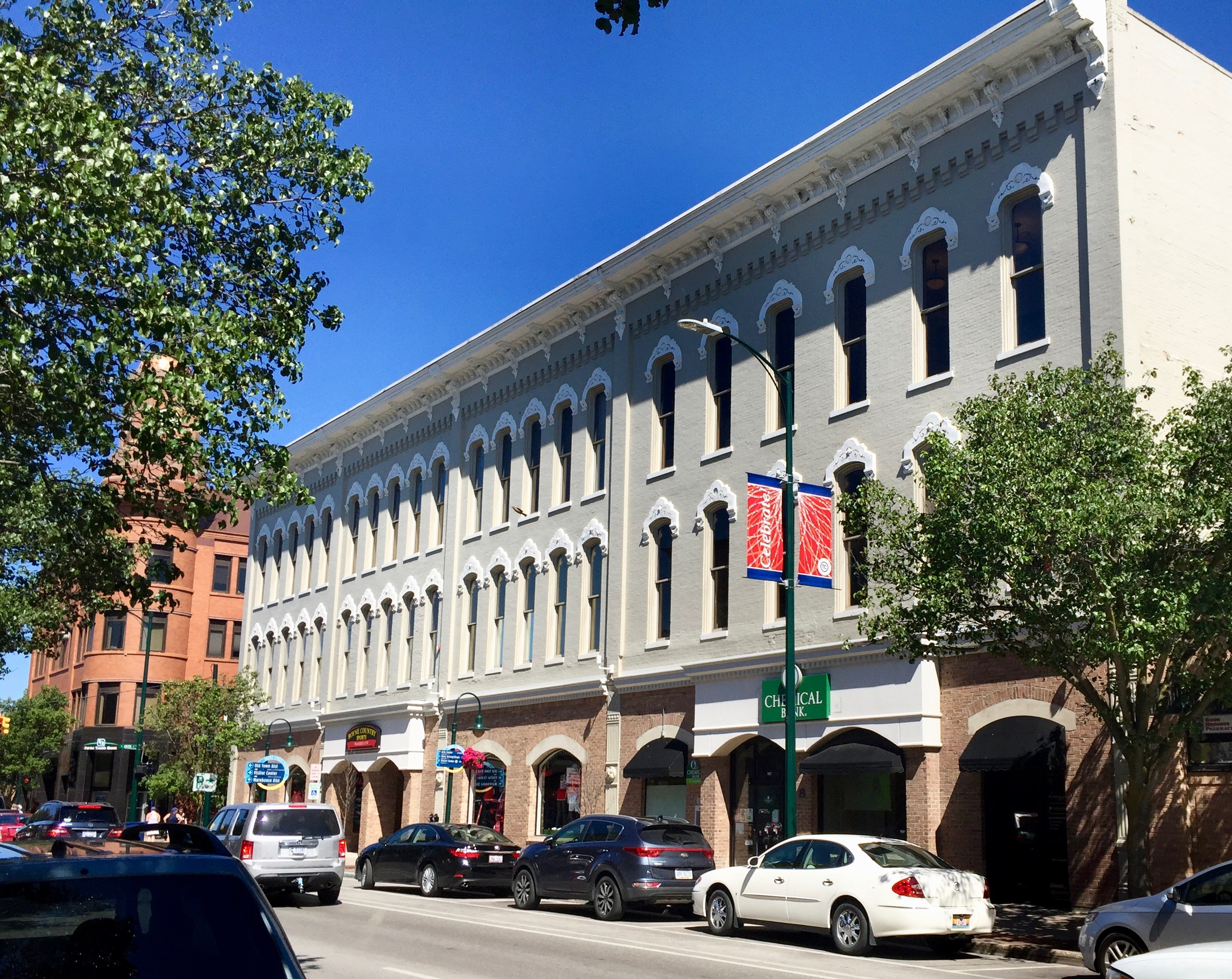
The historic Hannah Lay Building in downtown Traverse City.

The State Theatre in downtown Traverse City.

The city officially recognizes the following neighborhood associations:

- Base of Old Mission (BOOM) Neighborhood
- Boardman Neighborhood
- Central Neighborhood
- Fernwood Neighborhood
- Indian Woods Neighborhood
- Kids Creek Commons - newer and family friendly
- Midtown Centre Condominium Neighborhood
- Morgan Farms Neighborhood
- Oak Park Neighborhood
- Oakwood Triangle Neighborhood
- Old Towne Neighborhood - quiet tree-lined streets
- Slabtown Neighborhood - smaller, older, expensive homes
- Traverse Heights Neighborhood

The Kingsley & Interlochen communities have a 20-minute commute and somewhat lower home prices.

The city also recognizes the following commercial districts:

- East Side Social District
- Front Street District
- North Boardman Lake (NoBo) District
- Old Town District
- Warehouse District

The city employs two tax increment financing (TIF) districts: TIF 97, overlapping with the Front Street District, and Old Town TIF in the Old Town District.

=== Climate ===
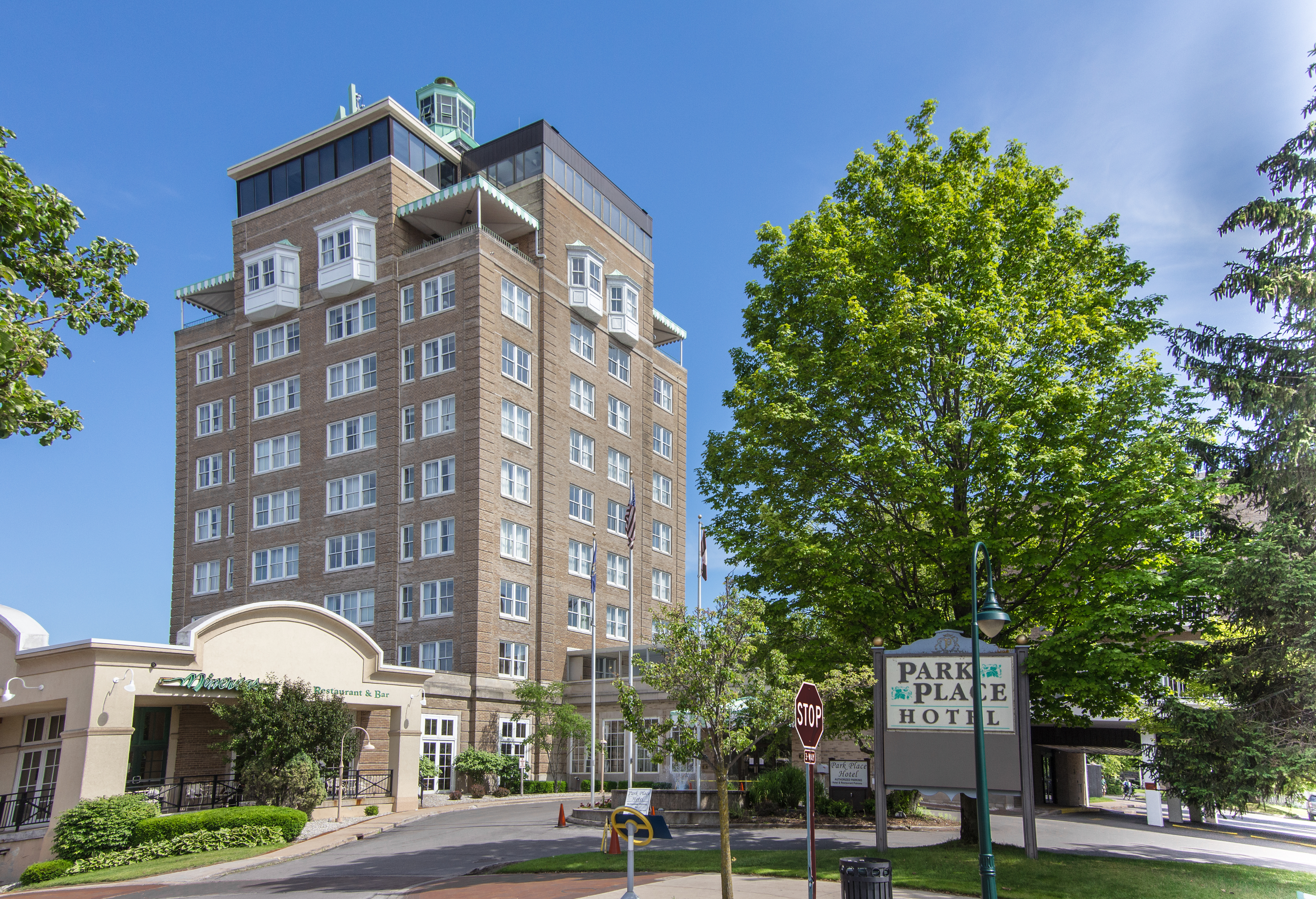
The Park Place Hotel, Traverse City's tallest building.

Traverse City has a warm-summer continental climate (Köppen Dfb) close to being a hot-summer continental climate (Dfa).

Its location near the 45th parallel is tempered by the strong and moderating effects of Lake Michigan and Grand Traverse Bay, which have a particularly noteworthy effect on the peninsulas that branch north of the city. As a result, they have viticulture and cherry orchards. Consequently, it generally experiences warm, mild summers and severe winters. Lake Michigan especially, but also Grand Traverse Bay, greatly impact the area's diverse coastal weather patterns, which occasionally consist of sudden and/or large amounts of precipitation during the seasonally active periods. Lake-effect snowfall constitutes a large percentage of the total annual snow accumulation, which averages around 80 inches (203 cm). Periods of snowfall typically last from November to April, although light snow as late as May or as early as late September sometimes occur.

Traverse City's record high temperature is 105 °F (41 °C), recorded in 1936, and its low temperature is −37 °F (−38 °C), recorded on February 17, 1979.

Climate data for Traverse City, Michigan (Cherry Capital Airport) (1991–2020 normals, extremes 1896–present)
Month	Jan	Feb	Mar	Apr	May	Jun	Jul	Aug	Sep	Oct	Nov	Dec	Year
Record high °F (°C)	59 (15)	73 (23)	87 (31)	90 (32)	96 (36)	104 (40)	105 (41)	100 (38)	96 (36)	89 (32)	78 (26)	66 (19)	105 (41)
Mean maximum °F (°C)	46.4 (8.0)	49.7 (9.8)	63.7 (17.6)	77.4 (25.2)	87.2 (30.7)	91.8 (33.2)	92.5 (33.6)	90.9 (32.7)	86.8 (30.4)	78.3 (25.7)	63.2 (17.3)	51.1 (10.6)	94.6 (34.8)
Mean daily maximum °F (°C)	29.3 (−1.5)	31.4 (−0.3)	41.2 (5.1)	53.9 (12.2)	67.2 (19.6)	77.1 (25.1)	81.3 (27.4)	79.6 (26.4)	72.1 (22.3)	58.7 (14.8)	45.5 (7.5)	34.6 (1.4)	56.0 (13.3)
Daily mean °F (°C)	23.1 (−4.9)	23.8 (−4.6)	32.2 (0.1)	43.4 (6.3)	55.3 (12.9)	65.6 (18.7)	70.3 (21.3)	69.2 (20.7)	61.9 (16.6)	49.9 (9.9)	38.7 (3.7)	29.1 (−1.6)	46.9 (8.3)
Mean daily minimum °F (°C)	17.0 (−8.3)	16.3 (−8.7)	23.2 (−4.9)	32.8 (0.4)	43.4 (6.3)	54.1 (12.3)	59.4 (15.2)	58.7 (14.8)	51.6 (10.9)	41.1 (5.1)	31.9 (−0.1)	23.5 (−4.7)	37.8 (3.2)
Mean minimum °F (°C)	−2.8 (−19.3)	−3.6 (−19.8)	1.2 (−17.1)	18.6 (−7.4)	28.8 (−1.8)	38.8 (3.8)	46.2 (7.9)	46.1 (7.8)	37.4 (3.0)	27.5 (−2.5)	18.0 (−7.8)	6.3 (−14.3)	−6.7 (−21.5)
Record low °F (°C)	−21 (−29)	−37 (−38)	−30 (−34)	1 (−17)	17 (−8)	28 (−2)	31 (−1)	32 (0)	26 (−3)	15 (−9)	−5 (−21)	−26 (−32)	−37 (−38)
Average precipitation inches (mm)	1.67 (42)	1.02 (26)	1.55 (39)	2.79 (71)	2.84 (72)	2.57 (65)	2.71 (69)	2.98 (76)	3.37 (86)	3.60 (91)	2.23 (57)	1.79 (45)	29.12 (740)
Average snowfall inches (cm)	33.2 (84)	18.9 (48)	10.7 (27)	2.6 (6.6)	0.1 (0.25)	0.0 (0.0)	0.0 (0.0)	0.0 (0.0)	0.0 (0.0)	0.2 (0.51)	9.0 (23)	26.7 (68)	101.4 (258)
Average precipitation days (≥ 0.01 in)	14.2	11.0	10.3	11.1	11.9	10.8	9.9	10.3	12.5	15.6	14.2	14.5	146.3
Average snowy days (≥ 0.1 in)	17.0	11.2	7.2	2.5	0.1	0.0	0.0	0.0	0.0	0.5	5.8	14.3	58.6
Source: NOAA

== Demographics ==
Historical population
Census	Pop.	Note	%±
1880	1,897		—
1890	4,353		129.5%
1900	9,407		116.1%
1910	12,115		28.8%
1920	10,925		−9.8%
1930	12,539		14.8%
1940	14,455		15.3%
1950	16,974		17.4%
1960	18,432		8.6%
1970	18,048		−2.1%
1980	15,516		−14.0%
1990	15,155		−2.3%
2000	14,532		−4.1%
2010	14,674		1.0%
2020	15,678		6.8%
2025 (est.)	15,832	▲	1.0%
U.S. Decennial Census

=== Racial and ethnic composition ===
Census Data
Measurement	2000	2010	2020
People	14,532	14,674	15,263
Population Density	1,728.7/mi^{2}	1,761.6/mi^{2}	1,827.9/mi^{2}
Housing Units	6,842	7,358	8,412
Housing Density	813.9/mi^{2}	883.3/mi^{2}	1007.4/mi^{2}
White	96.0%	94.4%	92.3%
Black	0.6%	0.7%	1.8%
Native	1.0%	1.8%	0.5%
Asian	0.5%	0.7%	1.3%
Other	0.5%	0.5%	0.3%
Two or more	1.4%	1.9%	3.8%
Hispanic	1.7%	1.9%	4.3%
Households	6,443	6,675	6,844
Families	3,485	3,369	3,507
HH/children	24.5%	22.3%	22.3%
Married couple	39.7%	35.6%	35.6%
Female/no husband	11.0%	10.9%	10.9%
Male/no wife	3.9%	4.0%	4.0%
Non-family	45.9%	49.5%	49.5%
Individual	35.9%	38.4%	38.4%
Senior alone	13.7%	13.2%	13.3%
Average household	2.15	2.08	2.14
Average family	2.82	2.77	2.89
Gender male	47.5%	47.4%	47.8%
Gender female	52.5%	52.6%	52.2%

=== 2000, 2010, and 2020 census data ===
UTL=Unable to locate
Measurement	2000	2010	2020
Age under 18	20.3%	18.2%	17.9%
Age 18–24	10.8%	10.3%	9.5%
Age 25–44	29.6%	26.7%	27.0%
Age 45–64	24.1%	28.3%	23.5%
Age 65+	15.2%	16.7%	22.0%
Median Age	38.0	40.8	40.4
Married	48.7%	UTL	41.8%
Never married	28.2%	UTL	35.5%
Divorced/separated	16.0%	UTL	16.2%
Widowed	7.2%	UTL	6.5%
Income under $10K	8.3%	UTL	13.0%
Income $10-$15K	6.1%	UTL	9.8%
Income $15-$25K	15.6%	UTL	11.2%
Income $25-$35K	16.9%	UTL	14.7%
Income $35-$50K	19.8%	UTL	12.8%
Income $50-$65K	11.8%	UTL	11.2%
Income $65-$75K	7.1%	UTL	5.0%
Income over $75K	15.3%	UTL	15.2%
Median income	$37,330	UTL	$33,532
Education not H.S. grad	11.3%	UTL	3.5%
H.S. grad or equivalent	21.8%	UTL	16.3%
Associate degree/college	35.7%	UTL	31.3%
Bachelor's degree	19.6%	UTL	28.4%
Graduate degree	11.6%	UTL	20.5%

=== 2020 census ===
As of the 2020 census, Traverse City had a population of 15,678. The median age was 43.6 years. 16.1% of residents were under the age of 18 and 23.3% of residents were 65 years of age or older. For every 100 females there were 93.3 males, and for every 100 females age 18 and over there were 91.8 males age 18 and over.

Of those residents, 15,341 lived in Grand Traverse County, with 337 (about 2.1%) living in Leelanau County.

As of the 2020 census, 99.9% of residents lived in urban areas, while 0.1% lived in rural areas. The city of Traverse City is part of the Traverse City-Garfield Urban Area, which had 56,890 people as of the 2020 census.

There were 7,377 households in Traverse City, of which 19.7% had children under the age of 18 living in them. Of all households, 35.6% were married-couple households, 22.4% were households with a male householder and no spouse or partner present, and 34.2% were households with a female householder and no spouse or partner present. About 41.6% of all households were made up of individuals and 17.2% had someone living alone who was 65 years of age or older.

There were 8,412 housing units, of which 12.3% were vacant. The homeowner vacancy rate was 1.2% and the rental vacancy rate was 6.5%.

=== Religion ===
Traverse City is part of the Roman Catholic Diocese of Gaylord. The city is part of the Episcopal Diocese of the Great Lakes and is served by Grace Episcopal Church.

== Government ==
Skyline of Traverse City from nearby Greilickville.

Traverse City is a home rule, charter city under the Home Rule City Act, incorporated on May 18, 1895. The city is governed by six commissioners and a mayor, elected at-large. Together they compose a seven-member legislative body. The commission appoints a city manager who serves as chief executive for city operations. The current city manager is Benjamin Marentette, who has been serving since July 21, 2025.

As of 2025, the city commission consists of mayor Amy Shamroe, mayor pro tempore Laura Ness, and commissioners Jackie Anderson, Lance Boehmer, Kenneth Funk, Heather Shaw, and Mitch Treadwell.

Traverse City is in Michigan's 1st congressional district, represented by Jack Bergman (R–Watersmeet). Like the rest of Michigan, it is served by Elissa Slotkin and Gary Peters (both Democratic) in the United States Senate. It is represented in the Michigan House of Representatives by Betsy Coffia (D–Traverse City), and is a part of the 103rd district. It is represented in the Michigan Senate by John Damoose (R–Harbor Springs) and is a part of the 37th senate district.

=== Taxes ===
Tax increment financing (TIF), authorized under Michigan law, allocates a portion of existing property tax revenue within a defined district. Traverse City's first TIF plan, adopted in 1985, funded the replacement of aging infrastructure. Its success led to the approval of "Infrastructure First" TIF97 in 1997, a 30-year plan to rebuild streets, sidewalks, and streetscapes; upgrade public restrooms, parking structures, bridges, and riverwalks; and improve the City Opera House and Clinch Park. A 2026 ballot proposal would have extended the TIF until 2047, but it was defeated 57% to 43%.

== Economy ==
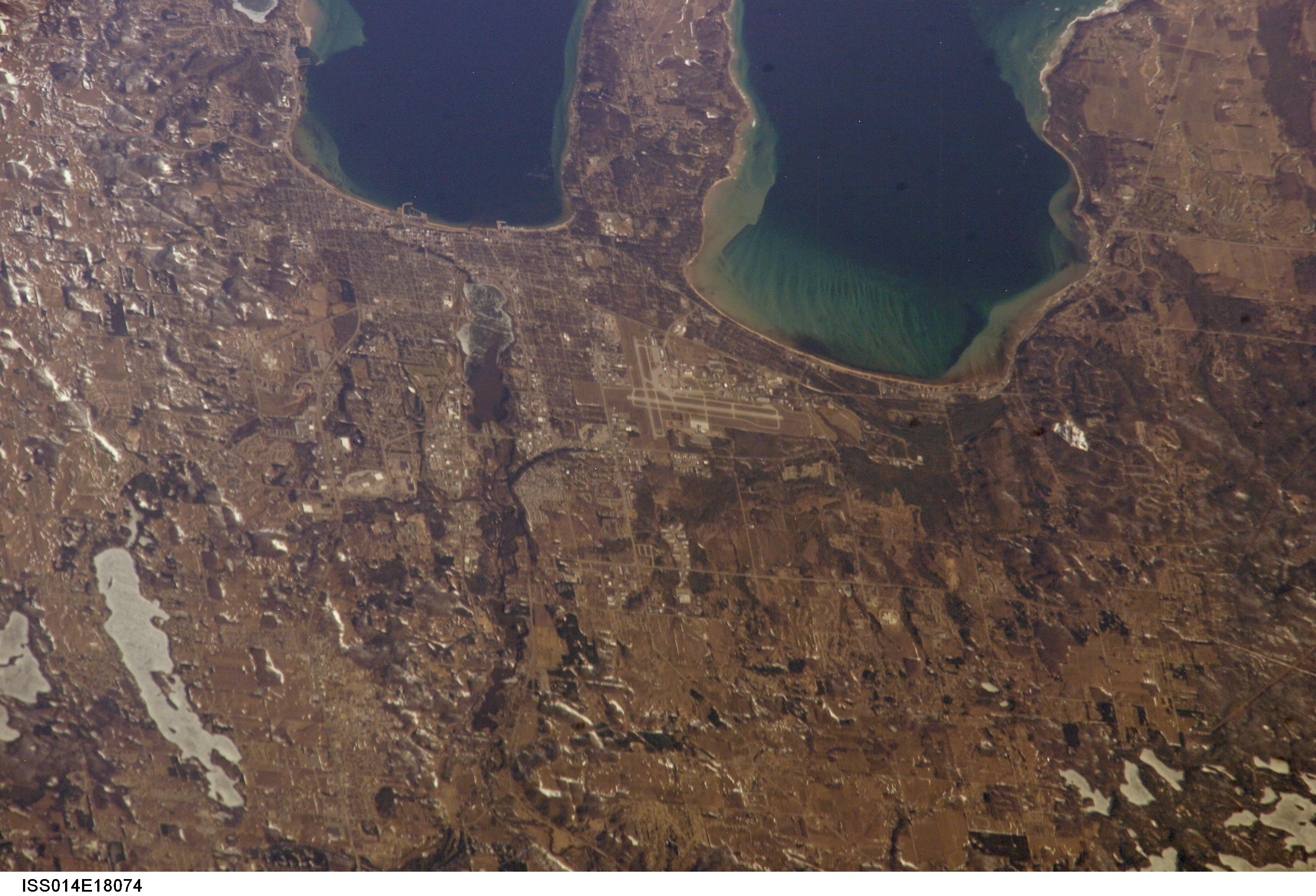
View of Traverse City and surrounding areas from the International Space Station in 2007

The economy of Traverse City evolved from an 1850 sawmill on the Boardman River into a diverse mix of tourism, healthcare, specialized manufacturing and professional services.

Healthcare & Social services account for roughly 19.6% of the workforce. when combined with private education services. Munson Healthcare is headquartered in the city and is the largest employer north of U.S. Route 10 in Michigan with over 5,500 employees. Traverse City is a medical referral hub for 29 counties.

The area has a long history in industrial tool design. John T. Parsons and Frank L. Stulen invented and patented Computer numerical control technology starting in the 1940s. Unlike most "tourist towns", Traverse City maintains a healthy industrial sector with advanced toolmaking and precision machinery. Manufacturing accounts for nearly 17% of total regional employment and provides wages 40% higher than the regional average. The Grand Traverse County manufacturing sector exported $1.3 billion in 2016. 20Fathoms serves as a technology incubator, hub and work space in Traverse City.

The Hospitality industry remains an important segment of Grand Traverse employing approximately 14% of the workforce. The large retail component and culinary reputation of using farm-to-table principles encourages tourist spending which increases sales tax revenue and requires service employees. Summer tourism drives retail sales and restaurant revenue but it raises the cost of living for locals and road congestion.

== Arts and culture ==
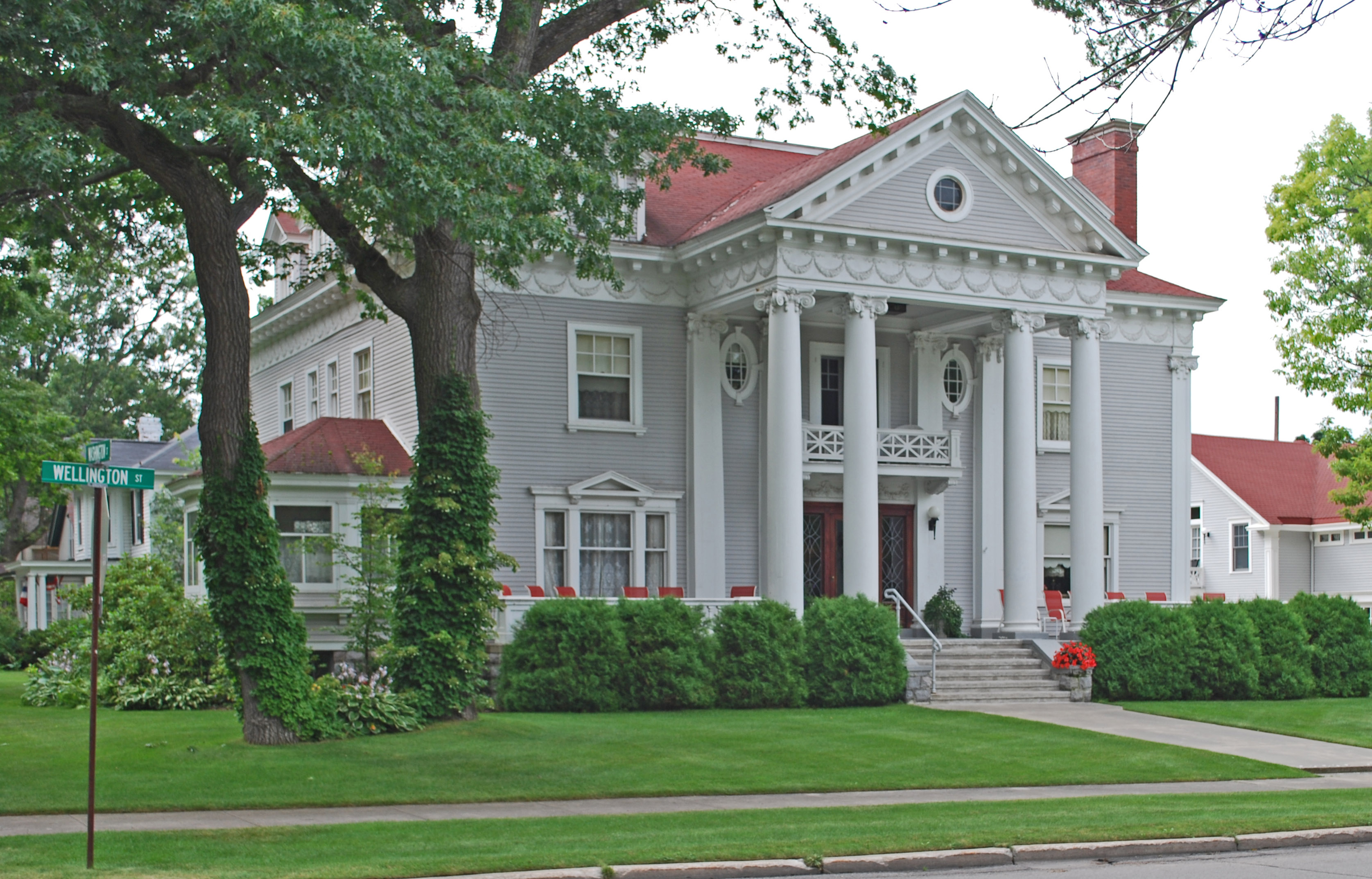
The Wellington Inn, a 1905 mansion in Traverse City's Boardman Neighborhood Historic District.

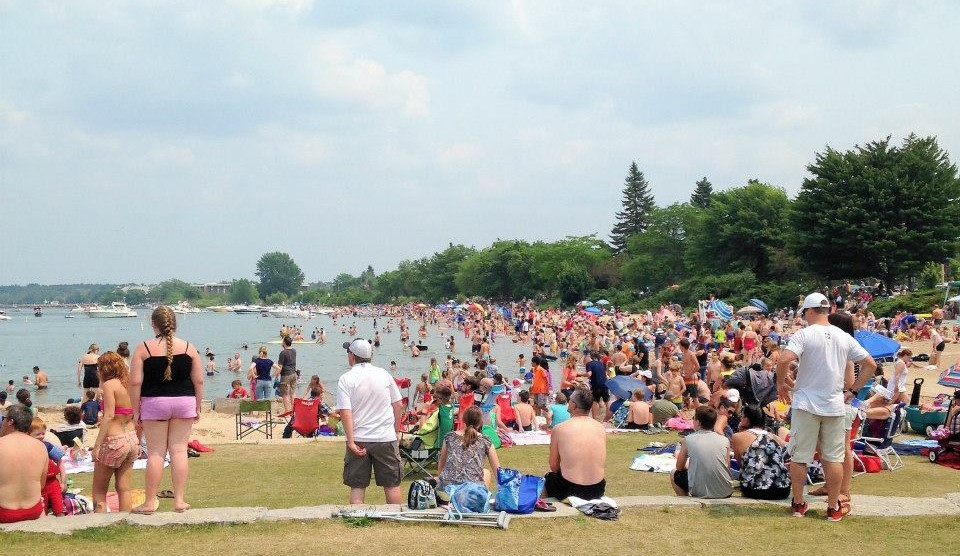
Tourists crowd Clinch Park during summer months in Traverse City

In November, Beer Week offers tours of breweries, samplings, and workshops.

In September, Traverse City Design Week brings together Northern Michigan’s creative community to use design as a catalyst for connection, innovation, and positive change

The National Cherry Festival, held annually in July, features parades, fireworks, an air show, carnival rides, election of festival royalty, music, a pie-eating contest, and cherries.

The Traverse City Film Festival was held in July and August from 2005 to 2019.

The Great Lakes Equestrian Festival features jumping, show hunting and equestrian competitions.

The Boardman River Nature Center is the interpretive center and management headquarters for the Grand Traverse Natural Education Reserve, a 505-acre local park and natural area.

Traverse City is located immediately adjacent to two American Viticultural Areas, the Leelanau Peninsula AVA and the Old Mission Peninsula AVA. There are over 50 wineries near Traverse City. Located in the harbor of the Great Lakes Maritime Academy is the T/S State of Michigan, a 224-foot (68 m) former Navy submarine surveillance vessel. The vessel is used as a classroom and laboratory while cadets of the academy are underway and shore side.

A tall ship, the schooner Manitou, is berthed at Traverse City, and offers passages to the public.

Excursion passenger trains from Traverse City have included a Cherry Festival train in 2008, and a "dinner train" from 1996 to 2004.

=== Performing arts and museum ===
The City Opera House features plays, movies, and performances.

The Traverse Symphony Orchestra was founded in 1952.

The Dennos Museum Center is located on the campus of Northwestern Michigan College.

=== Historical markers ===
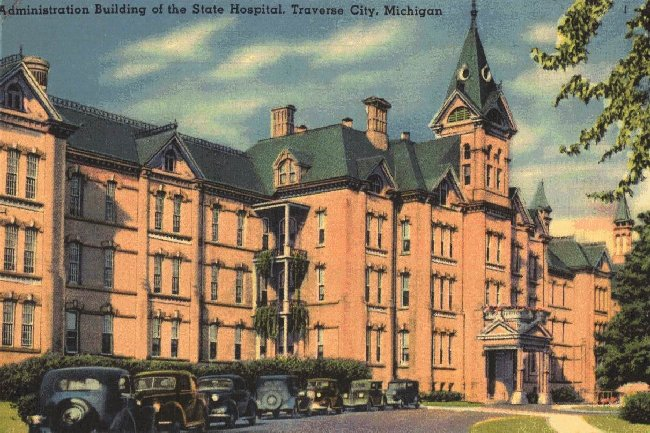
Historic postcard of Building 50, c. 1930

There are eleven recognized Michigan historical markers in the Traverse City area. They are:

- Bingham District No. 5 Schoolhouse
- City Opera House
- Congregation Beth El
- Grand Traverse Bay
- Grand Traverse County Courthouse
- Great Lakes Sport Fishery
- Ladies Library Association
- Novotny's Saloon
- Park Place Hotel
- Perry Hannah House
- Traverse City State Hospital

=== Libraries ===
Traverse City is served by the Traverse Area District Library (TADL), which has six branch libraries in Grand Traverse County.

== Sports ==
The Huntington Rink indoor arena is used primarily for ice hockey, and is the home of the Traverse City North Stars hockey team.

Professional sports teams
Club	Sport	League	Venue	Founded	Reference
Traverse City Pit Spitters	Baseball	Northwoods League	Turtle Creek Stadium	2019	
Traverse City Cohos	Hockey	Midwest Junior Hockey League	Centre Ice/Huntington Rink	2012	
Traverse City Wolves	Football	Great Lakes Football Conference	Thirlby Field	2007	
Traverse Bay Blues	Rugby	Michigan Rugby Football Union	N/A	1973	

From 1997 to 2025, the Detroit Red Wings of the National Hockey League held their training camp and an NHL Prospects Tournament at Traverse City's Centre Ice Arena. Traverse City is often referred to as Hockeytown North, in reference to Detroit's nickname, Hockeytown.

== Parks and recreation ==
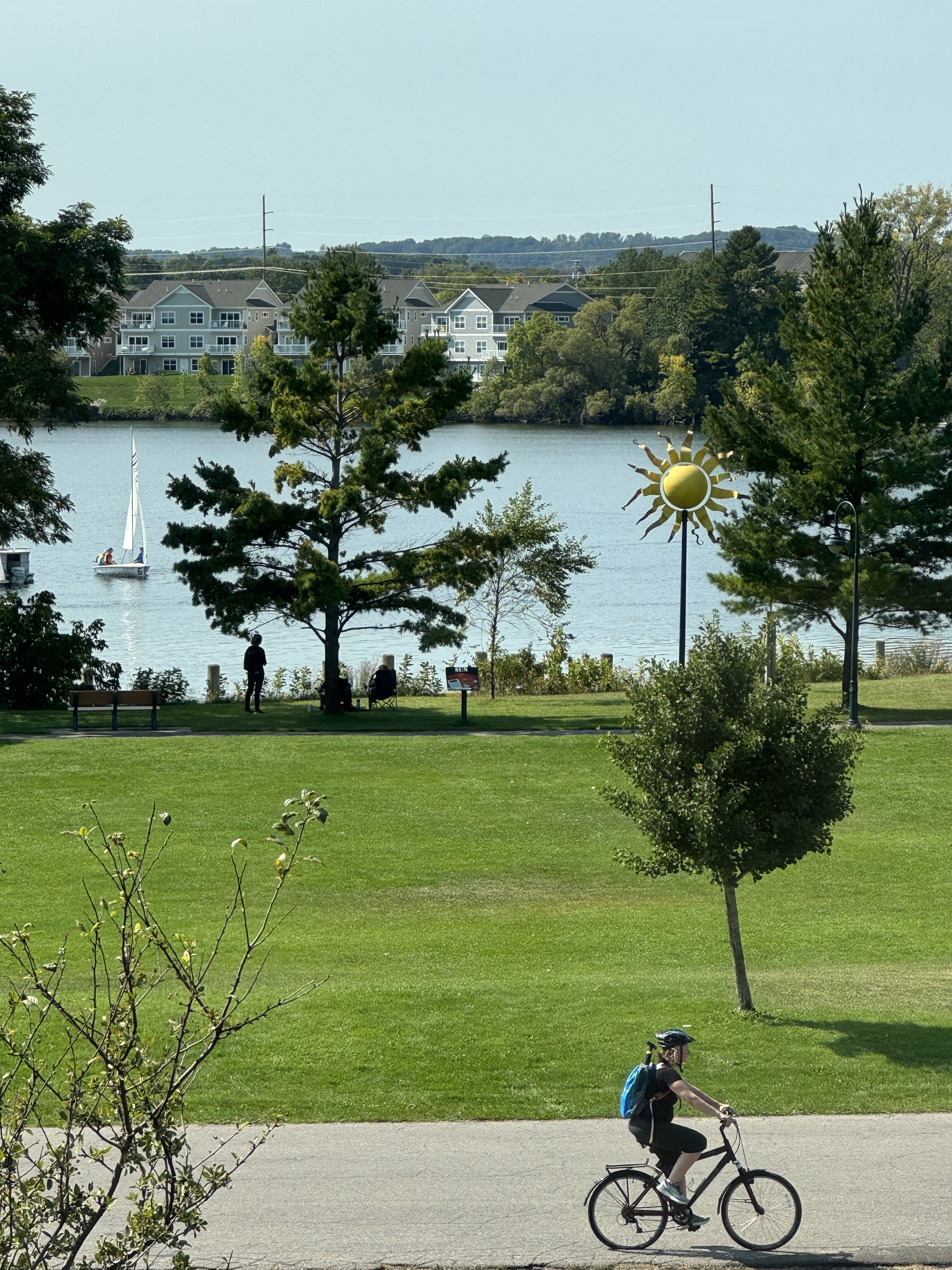
Hull Park on Boardman Lake in Traverse City; the bike path is part of the TART trail system

Traverse City has over 30 parkland properties. The city also owns and operates Hickory Hills, in adjacent Garfield Township, which offers downhill skiing, cross-country skiing, snowboarding, hiking trails, and disc golf. The city also operates Oakwood Cemetery, a 65-acre (26 ha) property on the city's east side.

Traverse City State Park, with about 250 campsites, is located east of the city, and features a beach on the East Bay arm of Grand Traverse Bay. The state park is located in nearby East Bay Township.

The Grand Traverse County Civic Center is a sports complex featuring seven baseball and softball fields, a skate park, walking trail, amphitheater, sledding hill, pavilion, and playground, as well as Howe Ice Arena, an indoor ice rink, and Easling Memorial Pool, an indoor swimming pool. The Grand Traverse Bay YMCA system, with locations outside city limits, features four complexes with swimming, soccer, and tennis.

The TART trail system is a series of non-motorized recreational trails in and around Traverse City.

== Education ==
=== Public schools ===
Public education is administered by Traverse City Area Public Schools (TCAPS). The district includes ten traditional elementary schools, one Montessori elementary and middle school, two traditional middle schools, and three high schools: Traverse City Central and Traverse City West, two traditional comprehensive high schools, and Traverse City High School, an alternative high school. The district includes the entirety of the city of Traverse City, as well as about half of Grand Traverse County, a portion of Leelanau County, and a smaller portion of nearby Benzie County.

Along with the TCAPS district, Traverse City has the Greenspire Schools which are a pair of public charter schools serving parts of Grand Traverse, Leelanau, Antrum, and Benzie counties. The school has two locations: a middle school and a high school, offering Montessori-type education focusing on both inside and outside classes.

The Grand Traverse Academy (or, GTA for short) is a tuition free public charter like The Greenspire Schools, but offers similar teaching style as TCAPS, as a co-educational ,Kindergarten, Elementary schools, and secondary school in the same building

=== Private schools ===
Traverse City offers a number of private schools.

Interlochen Center for the Arts, also home to the Interlochen Arts Academy, is a private fine arts boarding school. Founded in 1928, Interlochen Center for the Arts is one of the nation's first and foremost institutions dedicated to the development of young artists. The roots of Interlochen began with Joseph Maddy and his founding of the National Music Camp, now known as Interlochen Arts Camp and the Interlochen Summer Arts Festival, which bring student and professional artists from around the globe.

The Pathfinder School was founded by Arthur and Nancy Baxter in 1972 alongside teachers from surrounding schools: Interlochen, The Leelanau School, and Traverse City Area Public Schools.The Pathfinder belief's on teaching are to "require creativity, critical thinking, collaboration, initiative, and responsibility."

The Traverse Children's House emerged as a unified Montessori school when it opened its main campus in 2002 on North Long Lake Road. The building was intentionally designed to enhance the school's Montessori philosophy and teaching method for infants through 6th grade. The Children's House expanded to include 7th and 8th grade in 2014. In 2022, the growing young adolescent program became known as Compass Montessori Junior High and moved to its own campus in downtown Traverse City.

==== Religious schools ====
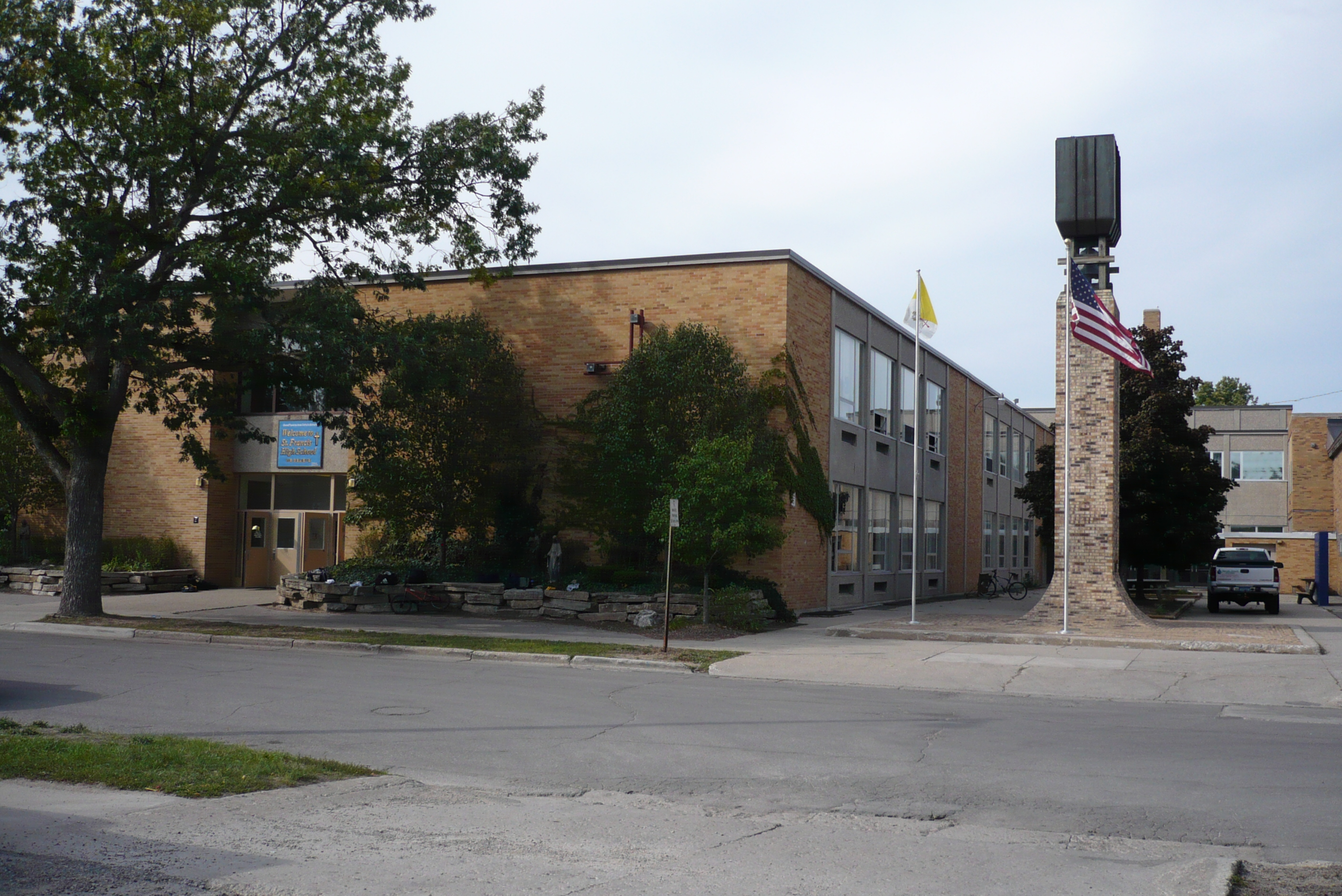
Exterior of St. Francis High School

Grand Traverse Area Catholic Schools administers Catholic schools, including St. Francis High School.

Other religious schools include:

- Traverse City Christian School
- Trinity Lutheran School
- Traverse Bay Mennonite School
- Traverse City Adventist School

=== Higher education ===
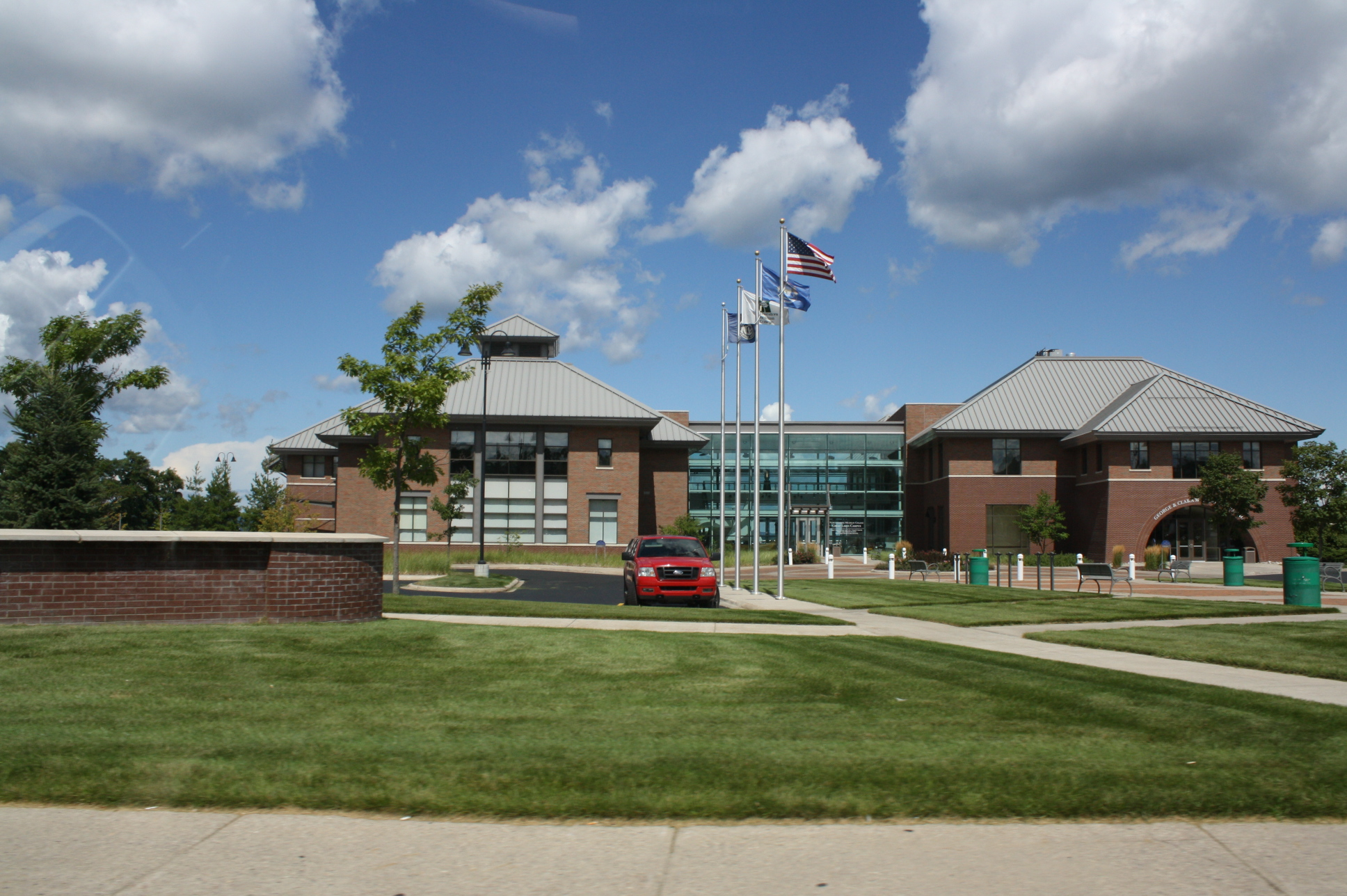
Northwestern Michigan College Hagerty Center

Traverse City is home to Northwestern Michigan College, a two-year community college. Its annual enrollment is around 5,100. One of its campuses is at the Cherry Capital Airport, and offers aviation and auto service classes. Another campus is at the Hagerty Center on Grand Traverse Bay, which is home to Great Lakes Maritime Academy, Great Lakes Culinary Institute, Great Lakes Water Studies Institute, and the Hagerty Conference Center.

== Media ==
=== Print ===
The Traverse City Record-Eagle is a daily newspaper circulated in the 13 counties surrounding the city, and is the newspaper of record for Grand Traverse County. Daily editions of the Detroit Free Press, The Detroit News, and The Grand Rapids Press are available.

Traverse is a monthly regional magazine.

Village Press and Arbutus Press are located in Traverse City.

=== Television ===
- Channel 7: WPBN-TV (NBC)
- Channel 29: WGTU (ABC)

Additionally, Traverse City is served by Cadillac stations WWTV (Channel 9, CBS); WMNN (Channel 26, ShopHQ); WCMV (Channel 27, PBS), satellite of WCMU in Mount Pleasant; WFQX (Channel 32, Fox); WFQX-DT2 (Channel 32.2, The CW Plus); and W23EB-D (Channels 23.1-23.7, 3ABN, Amazing Facts TV, Strong Tower Radio).

=== Radio ===
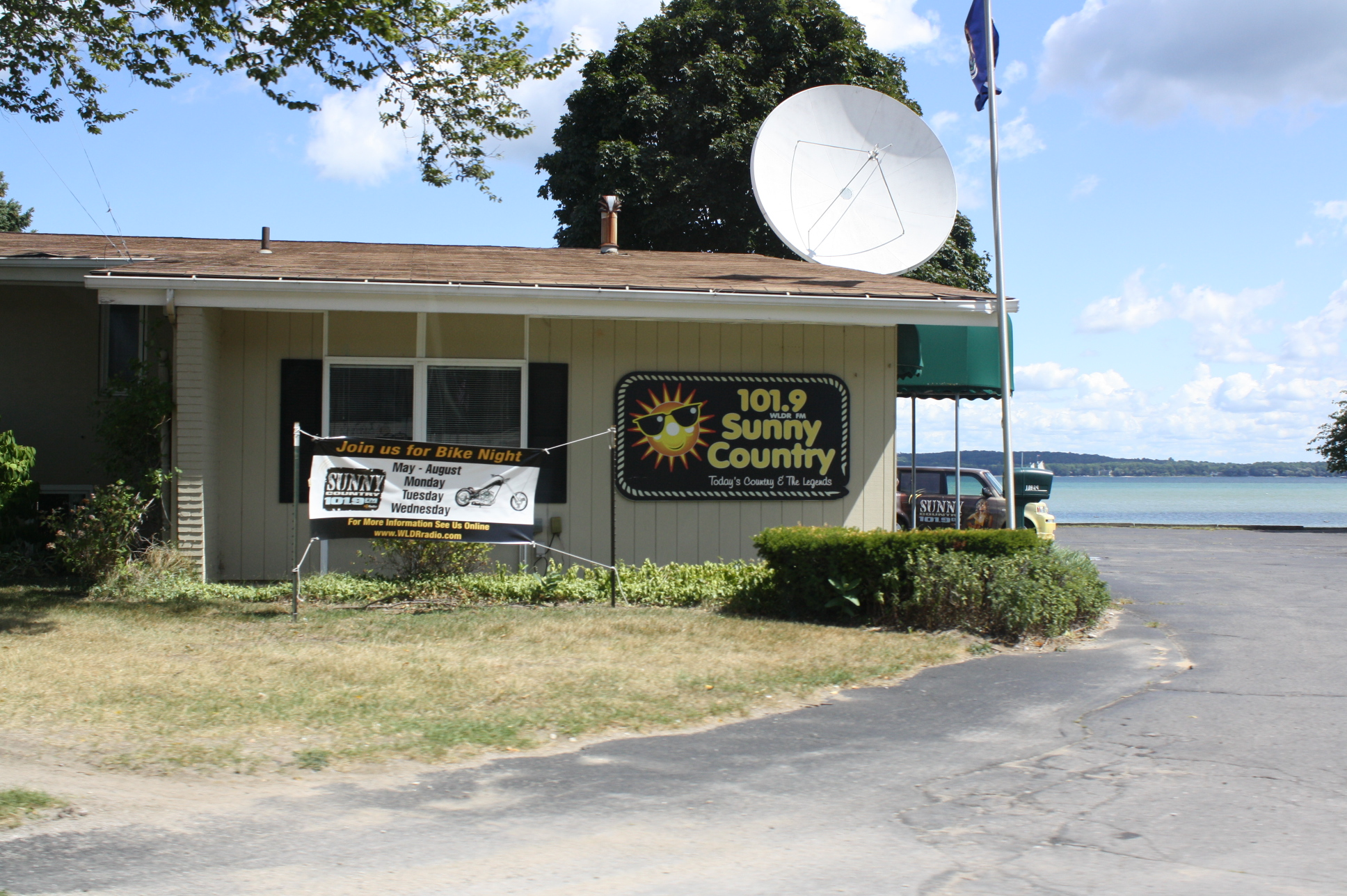
WLDR studios

There are 16 commercial radio stations in a variety of radio formats. Talk radio stations include WTCM, WWMN, WMKT, WSRT, and WLDR. AM 1310 broadcasts sports. WKLT broadcasts rock music, and WNMC is a community public radio station. There are three religious radio stations: W201CM (a translator at 88.1) and WLJN AM/FM 89.9 FM and 1400 AM. WLDR plays an adult contemporary format. Interlochen Center for the Arts broadcasts the NPR member station called Interlochen Public Radio; it serves a large portion of Northwest Lower Michigan via two stations.

== Infrastructure ==
=== Transportation ===
==== Airports ====
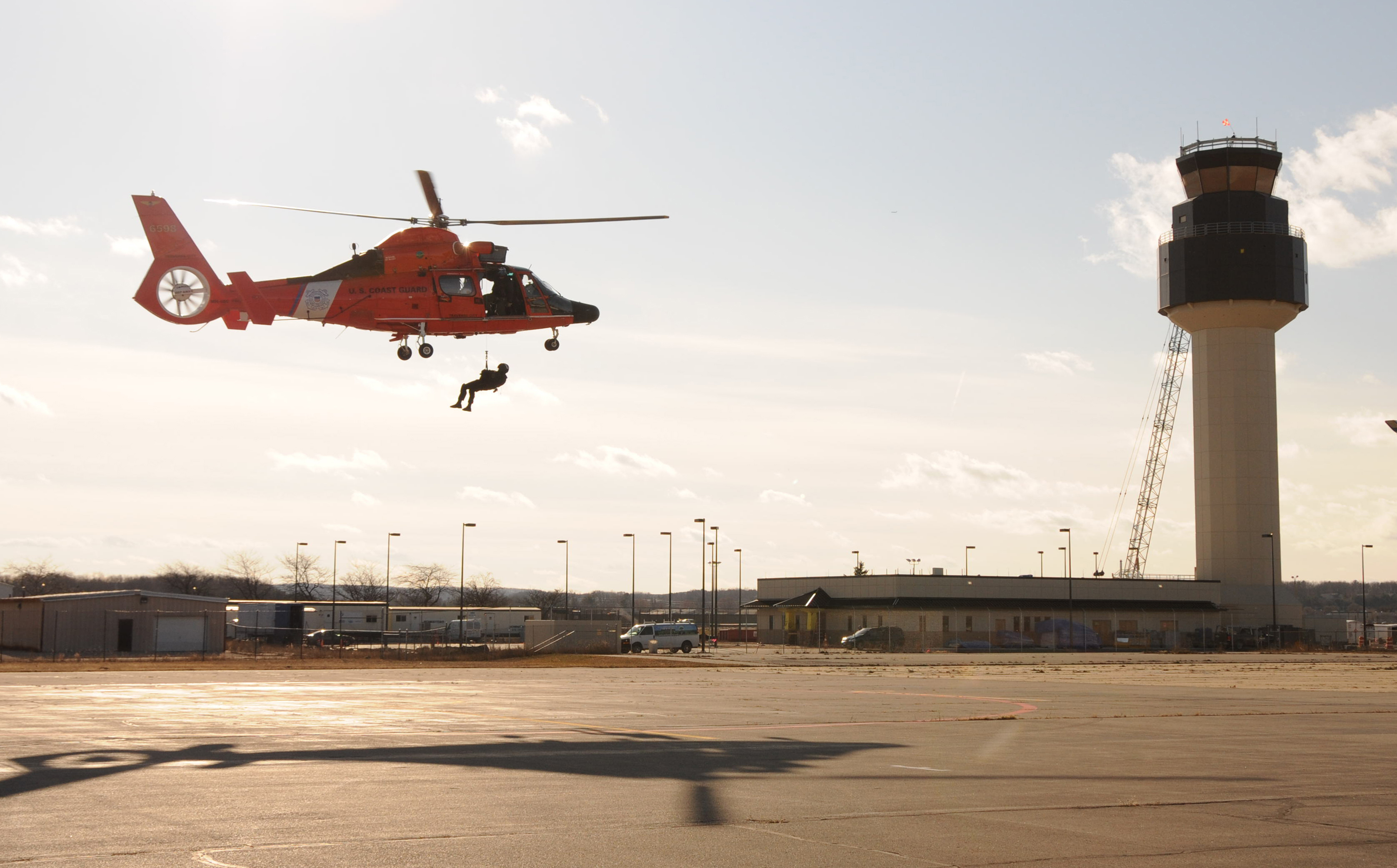
A Coast Guard helicopter training at Cherry Capital Airport

Cherry Capital Airport in Traverse City is the third busiest airport in Michigan, and serves as a primary aviation hub for Northern Michigan.

==== Buses ====
Bay Area Transportation Authority (BATA) offers local transit service in Traverse City, as well as to and from surrounding areas. Additionally, Indian Trails offers intercity bus service to St. Ignace to the north and Grand Rapids and Kalamazoo to the south.

==== Major highways ====
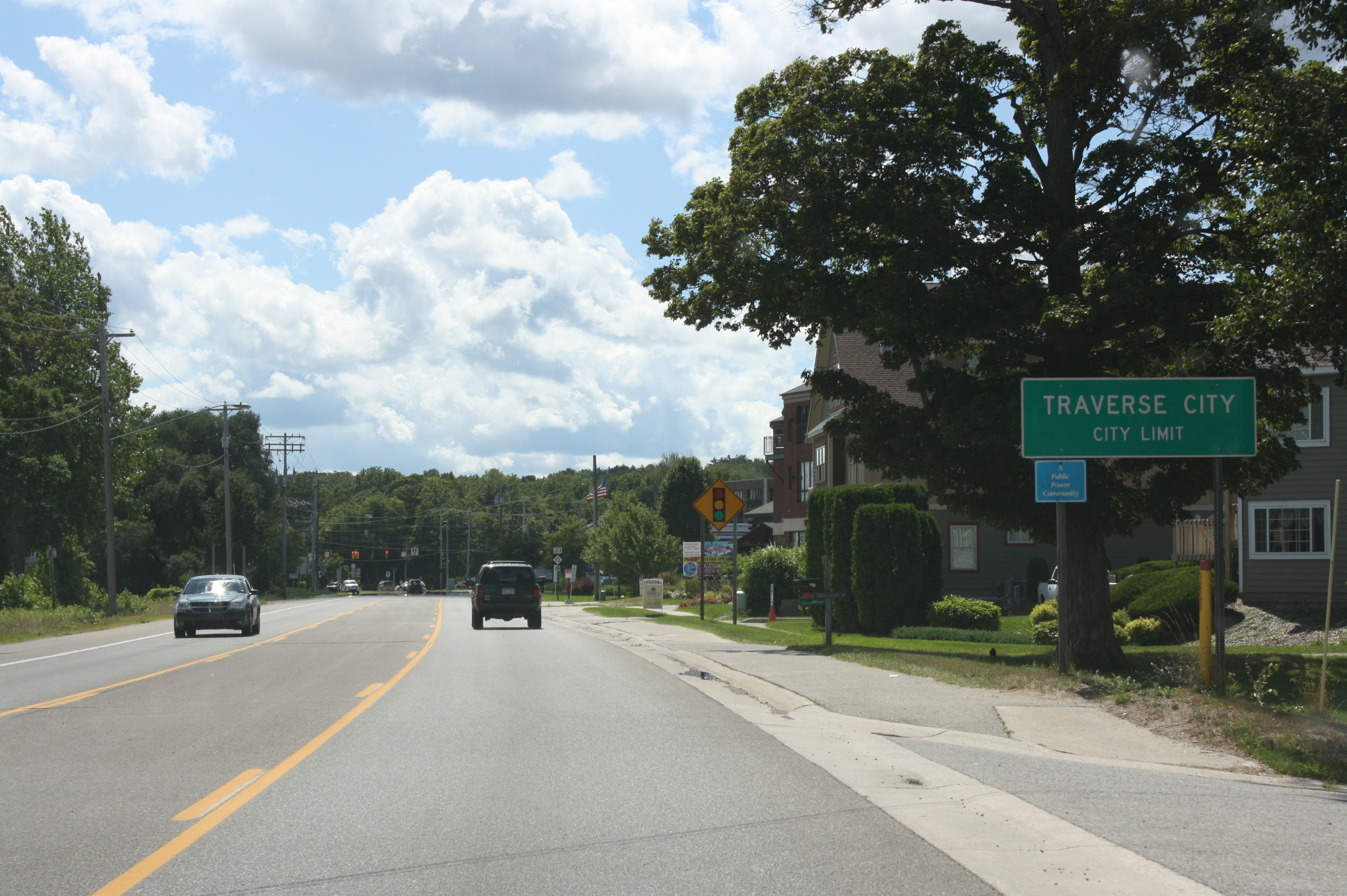
Sign on M-22 in Greilickville

- US 31 is a major north–south route running through the city. In Michigan, the highway largely parallels the shore of Lake Michigan.
- M-22 is a scenic highway with a terminus in Traverse City. The highway loops around the Leelanau Peninsula, and follows the shore of Lake Michigan south to Manistee.
- M-37 is a north–south route that passes through the city. The highway's northern terminus is at Mission Point Light, north of Traverse City.
- M-72 is an east–west route that traverses the Lower Peninsula.

=== Coast Guard ===
The Coast Guard Air Station Traverse City is responsible for maritime and land-based search and rescue in the northern Great Lakes region. Traverse City is one of two designated Coast Guard cities in Michigan, the other being Grand Haven.

=== Health care ===
Munson Medical Center is located here, and serves as a regional hub for 24 counties in Northern Michigan.

== Sister cities ==
- Kōka, Japan.

== See also ==
- Watershed Center Grand Traverse Bay
