= Huntington Rink =

Indoor arena in Traverse City, Michigan, US

Coordinates: 44.7086°N 85.5446°W

West Rink at Centre ICE (originally Republic Rink) is a 1,800-seat indoor arena located in Traverse City, Michigan. It is used primarily for ice hockey, and is the home of the Traverse City North Stars hockey team. The Traverse City Central High School, Traverse City St. Francis High School, and Traverse City West High School hockey teams also play their home games there, and the Detroit Red Wings hold their training camp at the arena.

West Rink is part of the Centre ICE Complex, which was built in 1997. The arena has been expanded twice. Its first expansion was in 2005 in order to accommodate the North Stars, and resulted in a permanent press box and the arena's luxury suite. The arena was expanded again in 2010, resulting in the addition of a mezzanine level with 180 seats, two NHL-sized locker rooms measuring 2,000 square feet (190 m^{2}) each, a hospitality area and a trainer's room. The complex also welcomed the addition of a daycare center. The arena's Polar Bear Club contains seating for 64 fans on 16 tables.
