= Central Neighborhood Historic District =

Historic district in Michigan, United States

- U.S. National Register of Historic Places
- U.S. Historic district
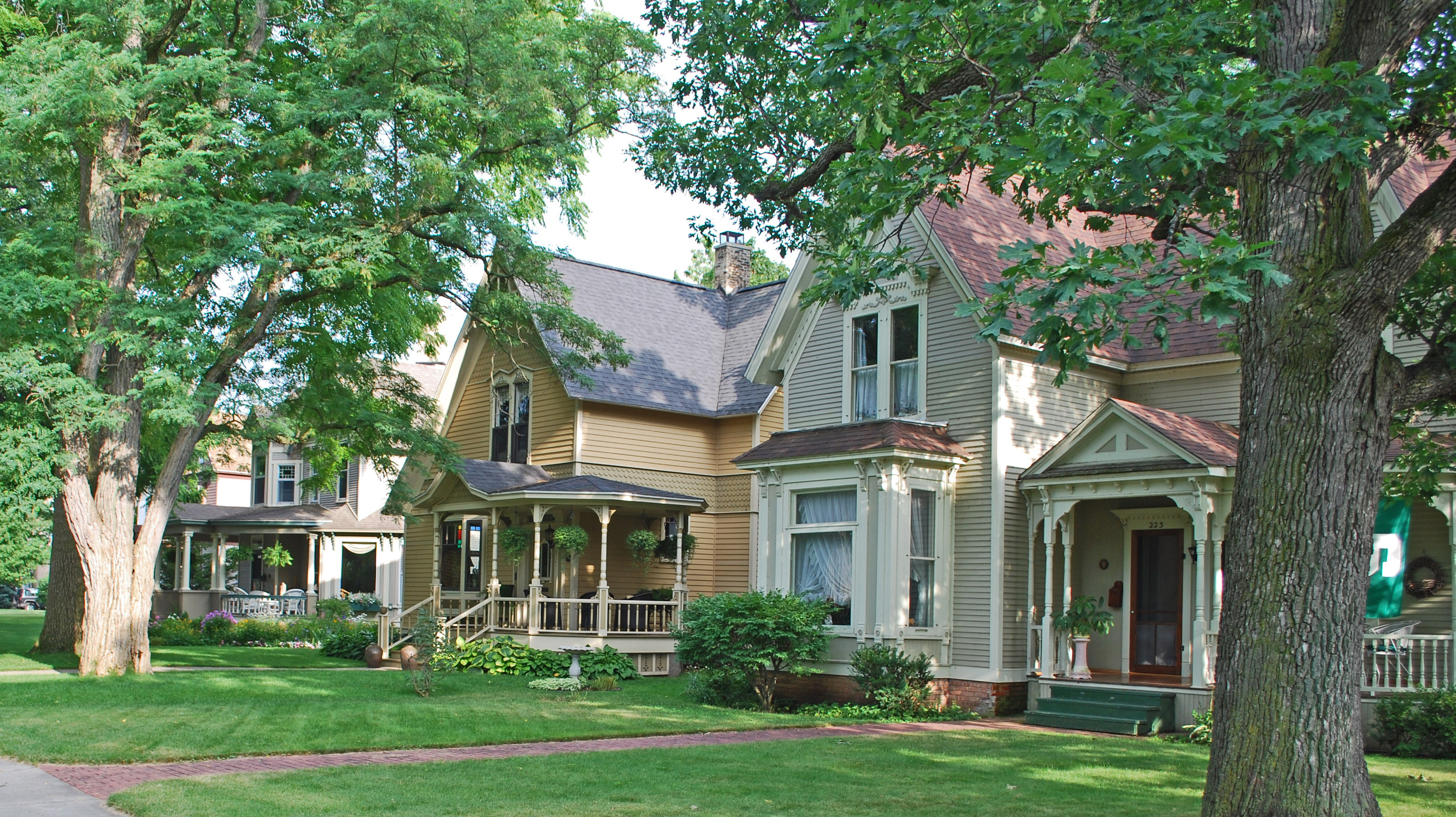

- Location within Michigan Location within the United States
- Interactive map showing the location of Central Neighborhood Historic District
- Location: Roughly bounded by 5th, Locust, Union, 9th, and Division Sts., Traverse City, Michigan
- Coordinates: 44°45′45″N 85°37′45″W
- Area: 121 acres (49 ha)
- Architect: Herman Smith
- Architectural style: Italianate, Neo-Georgian
- NRHP reference No.: 79001154
- Added to NRHP: December 11, 1979

The Central Neighborhood Historic District is a residential historic district, roughly bounded by 5th, Union, 9th, and Division Streets in Traverse City, Michigan. It was listed on the National Register of Historic Places in 1979. It includes the separately-listed Perry Hannah House. The district includes 459 structures.

== History ==
The Central Neighborhood was started around the turn of the century, with the majority of the houses in the neighborhood constructed between 1890 and 1914. Original residents of the neighborhood include lumber baron Perry Hannah, his son Julius and daughter-in-law Elsie Raff, fruit canner John Morgan and his son "Wild Bill" (later mayor of Traverse City), executive Cuyler Germaine, and Dr. James Munson, superintendent of the Northern Michigan Asylum. The neighborhood is unique for the socio-economic diversity of its residents.

== Description ==
The Central Neighborhood Historic District covers 121 acres and is primarily residential, including 407 single-family residences, 44 outbuildings, and eight churches and schools. Neighborhood architecture includes vernacular versions of Queen Anne, Italianate, and Neo-Georgian houses.

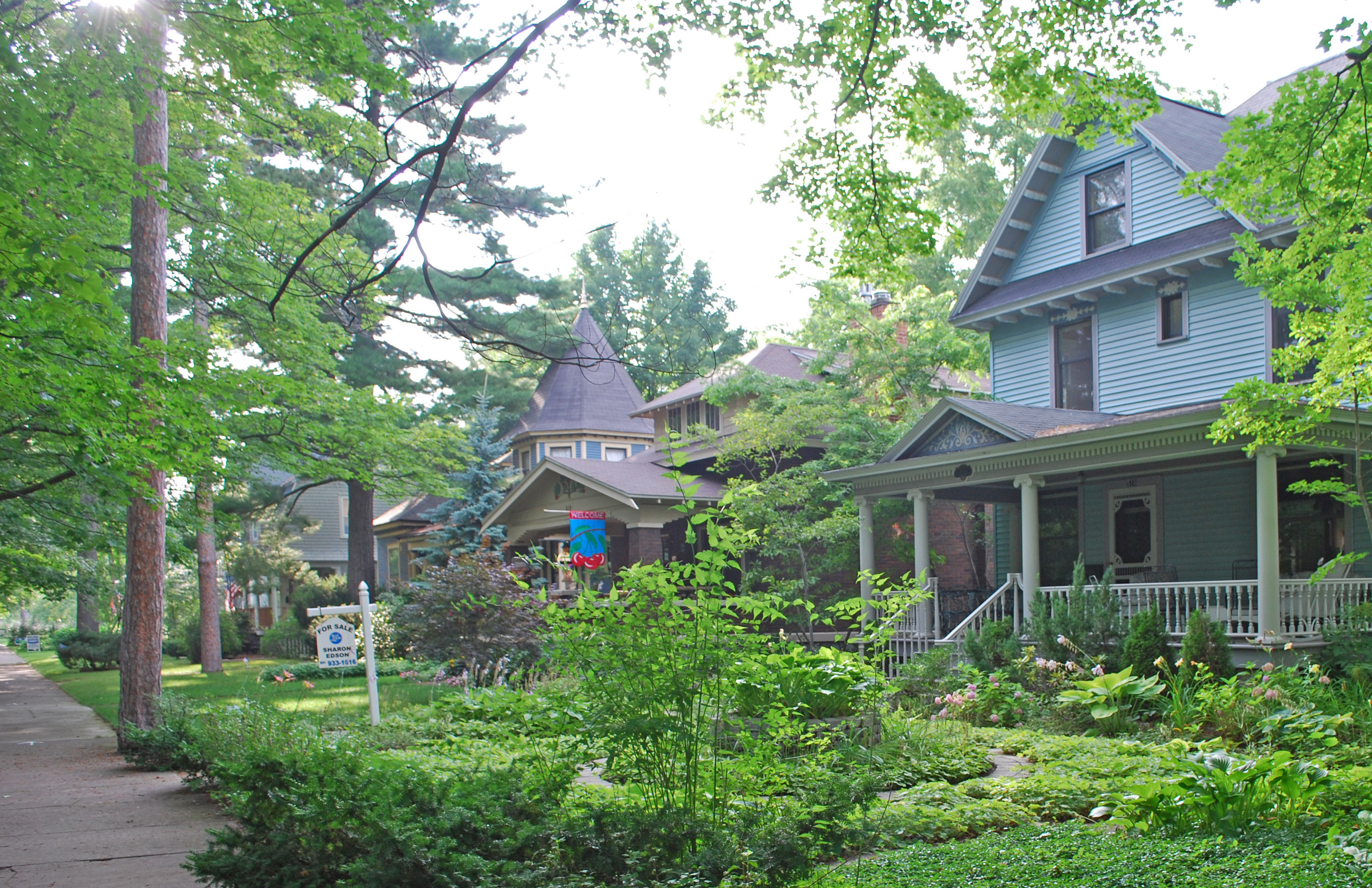
Another streetscape

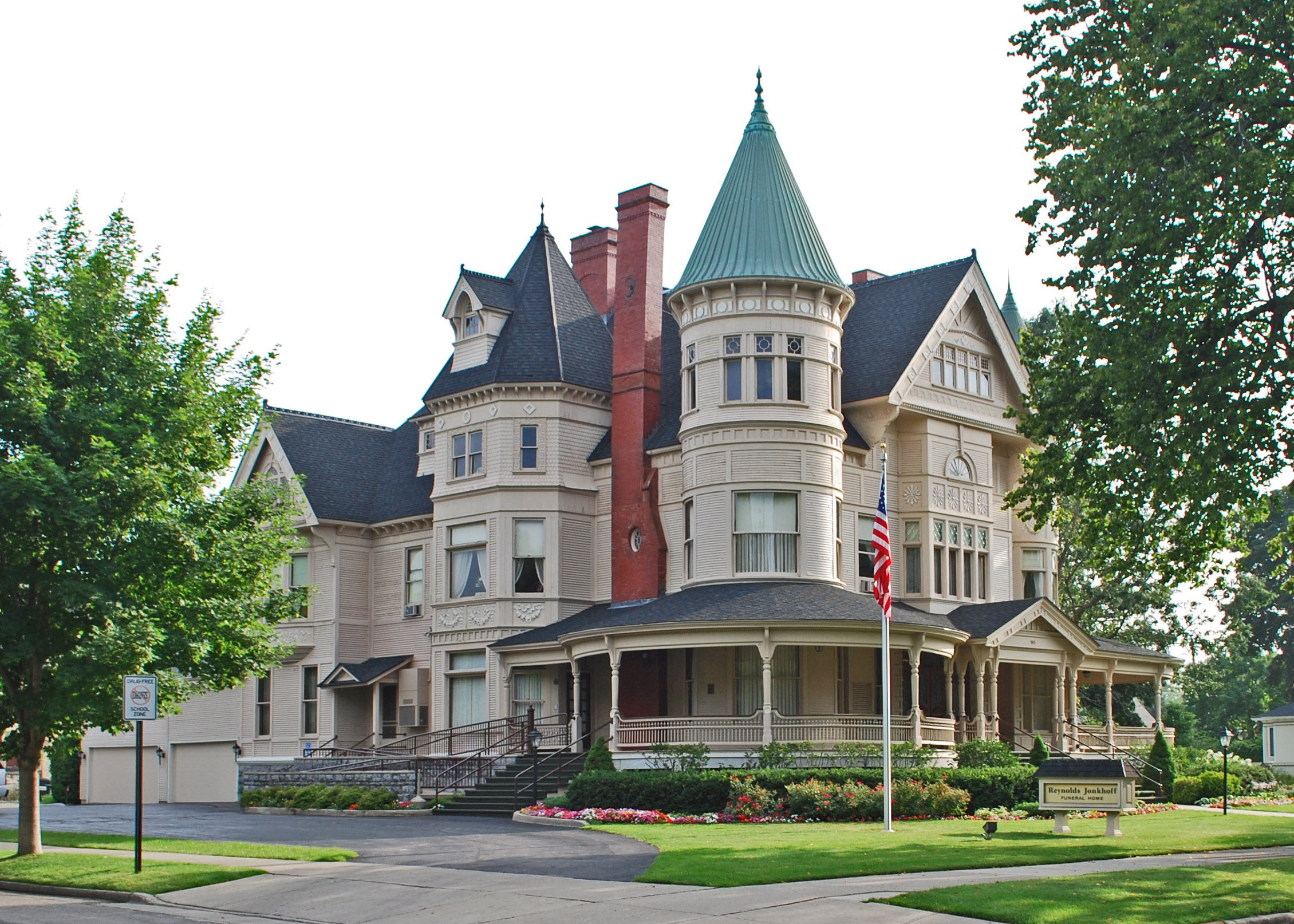
Perry Hannah House
