= HH13 =

HH13, HH-13, HH 13, HH.13, may refer to:

- A Rising Thunder (novel), abbreviated "HH13", 13th main-line novel in the Honor Harrington novel series, part of the Honorverse fictional milieu created by David Weber
- HH13, one of the Hamburger–Hamilton stages in chick development
- PTP4A2, protein tyrosine phosphatase type IVA 2, also called "HH13"
- Kisspeptin (HH13)

== See also ==
- HH (disambiguation)
- H13 (disambiguation)
- H (disambiguation)
