= List of mayors of Traverse City, Michigan =

Mayor of the City of Traverse City
- Incumbent; Amy Shamroe since November 13, 2023
- Style: Mr. Mayor
- Term length: Two years; renewable
- Inaugural holder: Perry Hannah
- Formation: 1895

Traverse City, Michigan is a home rule, charter city under the Home Rule Cities Act, incorporated on May 18, 1895. The city is governed by six commissioners and a mayor, elected at-large. Together they comprise a seven-member legislative body. The commission appoints a city manager who acts as chief executive for city operations. Below is a list of mayors and village presidents in Traverse City, Michigan. The mayor of Traverse City, Michigan is Amy Shamroe.

== Village presidents (1881–1895) ==
Number	Name	Years	Notes
1	Perry Hannah	1881–1885	This was his first term. Perry Hannah was the first village president of Traverse City.
2	Benjamin D. Ashton	1886	
3	Perry Hannah	1887–1894	This was his second term.

== First city charter (1895–1940) ==
Traverse City has been a city since 1895. The following are the first 24 mayors under the first city charter:

Number	Name	Year(s)	Notes
1	Perry Hannah	1895	Perry Hannah was the first Mayor of Traverse City, Michigan. He previously served as village president prior to the changeover to a mayoral system. Owner of Perry Hannah House and namesake of Hannah Avenue and Park
2	Harry C. Davis	1896	Namesake of Davis Street
3	William W. Smith	1897–1898	
4	Frank Hamilton	1899	Namesake of Hamilton Street
5	Alfred V. Friedrich	1900	
6	John Patchin	1901	
7	Oscar P. Carver	1902	Namesake of Carver Street
8	John R. Santo	1903	Namesake of Santo Street
9	Elisha J. Fulghum	1904	
10	A.V. Friedrich	1905–1907	
11	William D.C. Germaine	1908–1909	This was his first term. He was the owner, editor, and publisher of the weekly newspaper, the Traverse City Transcript. He was born on October 17, 1866, in Traverse City to Cuyler Germaine and Anna Kratochvil. He married Ola W. Hull on July 27, 1895. He died on January 3, 1943, in Traverse City.
12	Emanuel Wilhelm	1910–1911	
13	William D.C. Germaine	1912	This was his second term.
14	John G. Straub	1913	
15	C.L. Greilick	1914–1915	Namesake of Camp Greilick in East Bay Township
16	Edward Lautner	1916–1917	
17	Lafayette Swanton	1918–1922	
18	James T. Milliken	1923–1928	Father of future governor William Milliken
19	George W. Lardie	1929–1930	
20	Charles C. Wells	1931–1932	
21	E.L. Thirlby	1933–1934	Namesake of Thirlby Field
22	Moses Orville Champney	1935–1936	He was born on March 14, 1887, in Birmingham, Ohio. He died on July 12, 1952, in Traverse City.
23	Conrad H. Foster	1937–1938	He was the founder of the Clinch Park Zoo, and also founder and namesake of the Con Foster Museum in Traverse City. The zoo closed in 2006 and the museum prior to that. He died of a heart attack in Traverse City on April 3, 1940.

== City commission elections (1941–2000) ==
In 1940, a new city charter amendment was passed, allowing for mayors to be voted for directly by the city commission of Traverse City.

Number	Name	Years	Notes
24	Adolph LaFranier	1939–1940	Namesake of LaFranier Road
25	Orr E. Mead	1941	
26	Delmer R. Zimmerman	1942	
27	J.E. Ehrenberger	1943	
28	Carl Anderson	1944	
29	Ben H. Koenig	1945	
30	F.G. Swartz	1946–1947	
31	Hugh J. Johnson	1948	
32	Peter Clancy	1949	
33	Wilbur G. Watson	1950	
34	Julius C. Sleder	1951	
35	Jack D. Nelson	1952	
36	J. Kent Wright	1953	
37	Charles H. Round	1954	
38	Frank H. Power	1955–1956	
39	A.R. Jacobs	1957	
40	J.H. Stevens	1958	
41	Fritz Coppens	1959	
42	H.R. Murchie	1960	Namesake of Murchie Bridge
43	Frank L. Stulen	1961	Namesake of Parsons-Stulen Building
44	Larry Hardy	1962	
45	Robert H. Chase	1963	
46	Ralph Puclipher	1964	
47	Kenneth Lindsay	1965	
48	Carter B. Strong	1966	
49	Vincent Fochtman	1967	
50	Royce Kephart	1968	
51	Nick Rajkovich	1969	
52	William K. Lynch	1970	
53	John Rokos	1971	
54	Richard Purvis	1972	
55	John W. Rennie	1973	
56	Carl Huffman	1974	
57	Diane C. Gilbo	1975	
58	Raymond L. Sutton	1976	
59	Howard A. Bartling	1977	
60	Peter C. Dendrinos	1978	Namesake of Dendrinos Center and Dendrinos Drive
61	Calvin G. Martin	1979	
62	Norman A. Kline	1980	
63	Lawrence A. Muzzarelli	1981–1982	
64	Carol J. Hale	1983	
65	Frederick D. Nelson	1984	
66	Phillip E. Orth	1985	
67	Gerald M. Williams	1986	
68	Geraldine D. Greene	1987	
69	Bryan J. Crough	1988	
70	Phillip E. Rodgers Jr.	1989	
71	Al Ritchie	1990	
72	Jim F. Tompkins Jr.	1991	
73	Peter T. Taylor	1992	
74	Linda M. Johnson	1993	
75	Jack E. Boynton	1994	
76	Jim F. Tompkins Jr.	1995	
77	Peter T. Taylor	1996	
78	Shelley A. Kester	1996	
79	Phillip E. Orth	1997	
80	Larry Hardy	1998	
81	Jim F. Tompkins Jr.	1999	
82	Linda Smyka	2000	
83	Larry Hardy	2001	

== City voter elections (2000–present) ==
In 2000, a new city charter amendment allowed for the citizens of Traverse City to vote directly for mayor. Mayors now could hold unlimited terms of two years.

Number	Name	Years	Notes
84	Margaret B. Dodd	2001–2003	
85	Linda Smyka	2003–2007	
86	Michael Estes	2007–2009	One term, first time in office.
87	Chris M. Bzdok	2009–2011	
88	Michael Estes	2011–2015	Two terms, second time in office.
89	Jim Carruthers	2015–2021	Served three consecutive terms, and was Traverse City's first openly gay mayor
90	Richard Lewis	2021–2023	Former city council member
91	Amy Shamroe	2023–	Mayor pro tem from 2017 to 2023; reelected in 2025
