= Frank L. Stulen =

American aeronautical engineer (1921–2010)

43rd Mayor of Traverse City
- In office January 1, 1961 – January 1, 1962
- Preceded by: H.R. Murchie
- Succeeded by: Larry Hardy

Personal details
- Born: Frank Lem Stulen; January 22, 1921 Pittsburgh, Pennsylvania, U.S.
- Died: June 25, 2010 (aged 89) Traverse City, Michigan, U.S.
- Resting place: Oakwood Cemetery
- Spouse: Dorothy
- Education: Carnegie Mellon University (Carnegie Tech)
- Occupation: Inventor, Engineer
- Awards: National Medal of Technology and Innovation

Frank Lem Stulen (January 22, 1921 – June 25, 2010) graduated from Carnegie Mellon University (then Carnegie Tech) in 1942 with a degree in aeronautical engineering. After graduation, Stulen served in the U.S. Army Corps of Engineers and in the U.S. Air Force from 1942 to 1946, where he was head of the Propeller Lab, Rotary Wing Branch based out of Wright-Patterson Air Force Base. After a meeting with John T. Parsons, he was hired as Chief Engineer and Vice President of Engineering at Parsons Corporation in Traverse City, Michigan.

While working at Parsons Corporation, he invented numerical control of machine tools in collaboration with Parsons. Though Parsons developed many of the core ideas, it was Stulen, as chief engineer, who turned these ideas into working machines and processes. In 1985, Stulen and Parsons were jointly awarded the National Medal of Technology by President Ronald Reagan for "Revolutioniz[ing] Production of Cars And Airplanes With Numerical Controls For Machines".

Stulen was also Mayor of Traverse City, Michigan, in 1961 and 1962. he died in Traverse City Michigan on June 25, 2010 of heart failure at 89

== Life ==
Stulen was born on January 22, 1921, in Pittsburgh, Pennsylvania. He went to Carnegie Mellon University (then called Carnegie Tech), and moved to Traverse City, Michigan, to begin his work with Parsons.

== Development of numerical control ==
In 1942, Parsons was told that helicopters were going to be the "next big thing" by the former head of Ford Trimotor production, Bill Stout. He called Sikorsky Aircraft to inquire about possible work, and soon got a contract to build the wooden stringers in the rotor blades. At the time, rotor blades were built in the same fashion that fixed wings were, consisting of a long tubular steel spar with stringers (or more accurately ribs) set on them to provide the aerodynamic shape that was then covered with a stressed skin. The stringers for the rotors were built from a design provided by Sikorsky, which was sent to Parsons as a series of 17 points defining the outline. Parsons then had to "fill in" the dots with a French curve to generate an outline. A wooden jig was built up to form the outside of the outline, and the pieces of wood forming the stringer were placed under pressure against the inside of the jig so they formed the proper curve. A series of trusswork members were then assembled inside this outline to provide strength.

Parsons set up production at a disused furniture factory and ramped up production, but one of the blades failed and it was traced to a problem in the spar. At least some of the problem appeared to stem from spot welding a metal collar on the stringer to the metal spar. The collar was built into the stringer during construction, then slid onto the spar and welded in the proper position. Parsons suggested a new method of attaching the stringers directly to the spar using adhesives, never before tried on an aircraft design.

That development led Parsons to consider the possibility of using stamped metal stringers instead of wood. These would not only be much stronger, but far easier to make as well, as they would eliminate the complex layup and glue and screw fastening on the wood. Duplicating this in a metal punch would require the wooden jig to be replaced by a metal cutting tool made of tool steel. Such a device would not be easy to produce given the complex outline. Looking for ideas, Parsons visited Wright Field to see Stulen, the head of the Propeller Lab Rotary Wing Branch. During their conversation, Stulen concluded that Parsons didn't really know what he was talking about. Parsons realized Stulen had reached this conclusion, and hired him on the spot. Stulen started work on 1 April 1946 and hired three new engineers to join him.

Stulen's brother worked at Curtis Wright Propeller, and mentioned that they were using punched card calculators for engineering calculations. Stulen decided to adopt the idea to run stress calculations on the rotors, the first detailed automated calculations on helicopter rotors. When Parsons saw what Stulen was doing with the punched card machines, he asked Stulen if they could be used to generate an outline with 200 points instead of the 17 they were given, and offset each point by the radius of a mill cutting tool. If a cut was made at each of those points, it would produce a relatively accurate cutout of the stringer. This could cut the tool steel and then easily be filed down to a smooth template for stamping metal stringers.

Stulen had no problem making such a program, and used it to produce large tables of numbers that would be taken onto the machine floor. Here, one operator read the numbers off the charts to two other operators, one on each of the X- and Y- axes. For each pair of numbers the operators would move the cutting head to the indicated spot and then lower the tool to make the cut. This was called the "by-the-numbers method", or more technically, "plunge-cutting positioning". It was a labor-intensive prototype of today's 2.5 axis machining (two-and-a-half-axis machining).

== Legacy ==
The Parsons-Stulen building, home of the Northwestern Michigan College Aviation Campus at Cherry Capital Airport, is named after Parsons and Stulen.
