= Munson Medical Center =

- Munson Healthcare
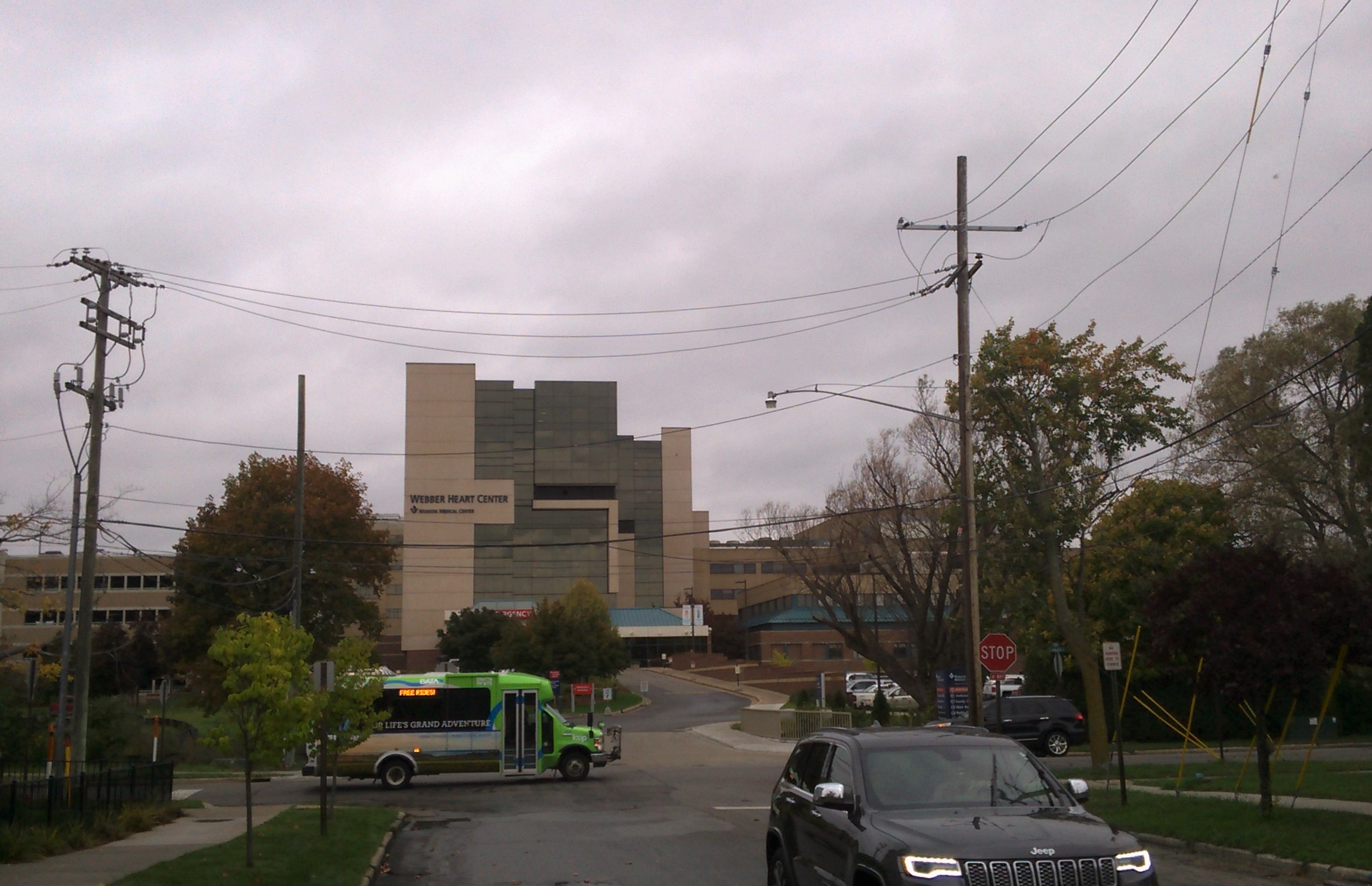

Geography
- Location: Traverse City, Michigan, United States
- Coordinates: 44.7608°N 85.64195°W

Organization
- Type: Teaching hospital
- Affiliated university: Michigan State University College of Human Medicine, Michigan State University College of Osteopathic Medicine

Services
- Emergency department: Level II trauma center
- Beds: 442

History
- Founded: 1915

Links
- Website: www.munsonhealthcare.org/munson-medical-center
- Lists: Hospitals in Michigan

Munson Medical Center (MMC) is a 442-bed regional referral hospital in Traverse City, Michigan, United States. Its primary service area includes Antrim, Benzie, Grand Traverse, Kalkaska, and Leelanau counties.

The hospital also serves as a regional referral center for 24 counties in northern Michigan. It is one of three Level II Trauma Centers, north of Grand Rapids, with the other two being McLaren Northern Michigan in Petoskey and UP Health System - Marquette. It also has the only Neonatal Intensive Care Unit in northern Michigan. Munson Medical Center has been designated as a Primary Stroke Center by the Joint Commission, and is a Bariatric Surgery Center of Excellence. Munson also offers the only inpatient Behavioral Health services in northern Michigan.

Munson Medical Center is the largest of nine Munson Healthcare system hospitals located throughout northern Michigan. It has a medical staff of 420 physicians representing more than 50 specialty services and employs 3,700 people. As part of Munson Healthcare, it is the largest employer north of US 10.

== Hospitals ==
- Cadillac Hospital - Cadillac
- Charlevoix Hospital - Charlevoix
- Foster Family Community Health Center - Traverse City
- Grayling Hospital - Grayling
- Kalkaska Memorial Health Center - Kalkaska
- Mackinac Straits Health System - St. Ignace
- Manistee Hospital - Manistee
- Munson Medical Center (flagship location) - Traverse City
- Otsego Memorial Hospital - Gaylord
- Paul Oliver Memorial Hospital - Frankfort

== History ==
The beginnings of Munson Medical Center and Munson Healthcare can be traced to James Decker Munson, MD (1848–1929). Dr. Munson was the first superintendent of the state-owned Northern Michigan Asylum founded in 1885 (later known as Traverse City Psychiatric Hospital, which closed in 1989). He donated a boarding house for use as a community hospital in 1915. The permanent James Decker Munson Hospital opened in 1925 and still exists today within the Munson hospital complex. In 1949, the hospital and its land were deeded from the state to a new private corporation, James Decker Munson Hospital, Inc. The hospital was renamed in 1964 to reflect its changing status as a regional referral center.

Munson Medical Center became affiliated with Kalkaska Memorial Health Center in 1976 through a management agreement. Munson Healthcare was officially organized as a system of health care providers in 1985 when Paul Oliver Memorial Hospital in Frankfort affiliated with Munson Medical Center. The system now includes Charlevoix Area Hospital, Mercy Hospital Grayling, Mercy Hospital Cadillac, Otsego Memorial Hospital in Gaylord, and West Shore Medical Center in Manistee. Munson Healthcare employs more than 5,500 people.
