= Perry Hannah =

American politician and lumber baron (1824–1904)

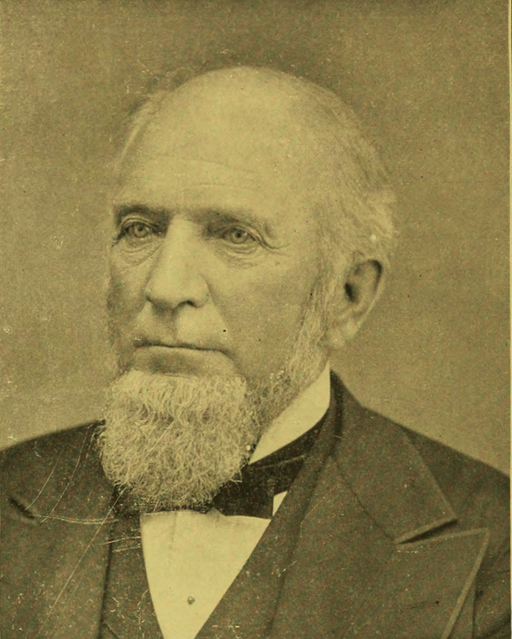

1st Mayor of Traverse City
- In office May 18, 1895 – January 1, 1896
- Preceded by: Office established
- Succeeded by: Harry C. Davis

1st and 3rd Village President of Traverse City
- In office 1881–1885
- Preceded by: Office established
- Succeeded by: Benjamin D. Ashton
- In office 1887 – May 18, 1895
- Preceded by: Benjamin D. Ashton
- Succeeded by: Office abolished

Member of the Michigan House of Representatives from Grand Traverse County
- In office January 7, 1857 – December 31, 1858

Personal details
- Born: September 22, 1824 Erie County, Pennsylvania, U.S.
- Died: August 16, 1904 (aged 79) Traverse City, Michigan, U.S.
- Resting place: Oakwood Cemetery
- Party: Republican
- Spouse: Annie Amelia Flint (m. 1852)
- Children: 3
- Occupation: Businessman, lumber baron, merchant, banker, politician

Perry Hannah (/hæˈnə/ HAN-ə; September 22, 1824 – August 16, 1904) was an American politician, businessman, lumber baron, merchant and banker, who was well involved in the settling and early industrialization of the Grand Traverse Bay region of Michigan. In the 1850s, Hannah and his company, Hannah, Lay & Co., purchased and platted land near the mouth of the Boardman River, which eventually developed into the city of Traverse City. As a politician, Hannah represented Grand Traverse County in the Michigan House of Representatives, and later served as village president and first mayor of Traverse City. Hannah also helped to establish the Traverse City State Hospital, a psychiatric hospital. Today, Hannah is often referred to as the "Father of Traverse City".

== Early life ==
Perry Hannah was born on September 22, 1824, on a farm outside Erie, Pennsylvania, to Elihu L. Hannah and Anna McCabb, both of Scottish descent. In 1827, Perry's mother died, prompting his father to send him to his grandmother's house while attending public schools in Erie County.

In 1840, a young Perry relocated to Port Huron, Michigan, following his father, who had moved there for work some years prior. After working various jobs in Port Huron, Hannah began working for a Chicago lumber company. Subsequently, in 1846, Hannah moved once again to Chicago to work for Jacob Beidler, one of Chicago's wealthiest lumbermen.

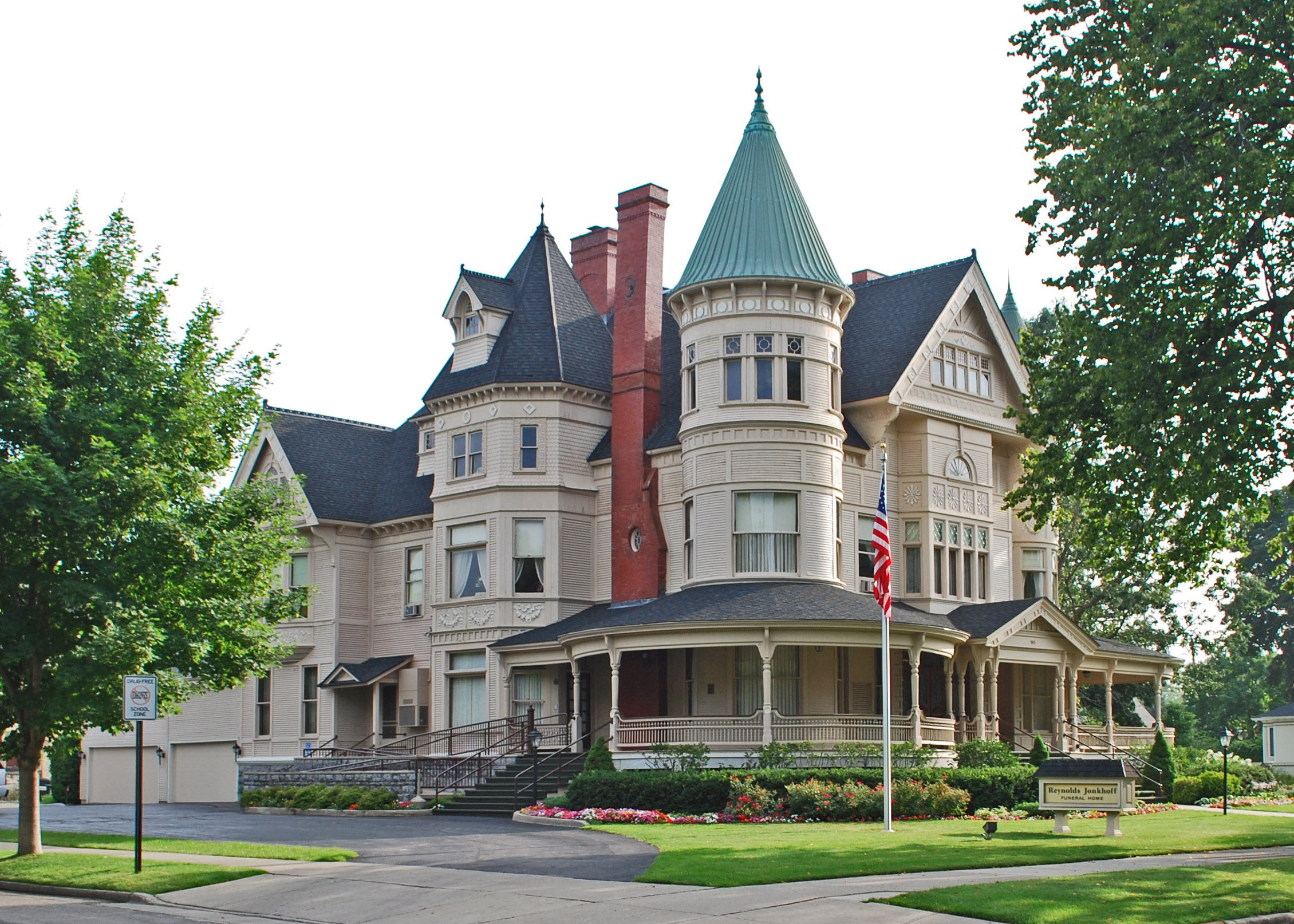
The Perry Hannah House in Traverse City

== Career ==
In 1849, Hannah partnered with Albert Tracy Lay and James Morgan, both other Chicago lumbermen, to found Hannah, Lay and Company, a lumber firm with property at the head of the Grand Traverse Bay and along the Boardman River, then known as the "Ottawa River". This property was purchased from Horace Boardman, a native of Naperville, Illinois. Boardman, a wealthy farmer, sailed to the bay in 1847, and built a small sawmill.

In 1851, Hannah, Lay & Co. purchased the sawmill from the Boardman family, and began cutting 50-60 thousand acres of land in the Boardman River valley. Hannah's company improved the now-dilapidated mill, increasing its investment and promise, thus attracting workers and settlers to Northwest Michigan.

In 1853, the only operating post office in the Grand Traverse Bay region was the one located at Old Mission, which was then known as "Grand Traverse". While in Washington, D.C. in 1852, Albert Tracy Lay had succeeded in getting the U.S. Post Office to authorize a new post office at his sawmill settlement, which was to be known as "Grand Traverse City", after the eponymous bay. Lay proposed this name for its post office, but the Post Office Department clerk suggested dropping the "Grand" from the name, as to limit confusion between this new office and the one at nearby Old Mission. Lay agreed to the new, shortened name of "Traverse City" for the post office, and the village took on this name.

As Traverse City grew, Hannah, Lay & Co. offered more jobs, such as general mercantile and banking. By 1856, the company was the largest employer in the area, essentially making Traverse City a company town; anyone who desired a job with Hannah, Lay & Co. would receive one in Traverse City. The company built much of the infrastructure along Front Street and the Boardman River, a majority of which still stands today.

=== Political career ===
In 1857, Hannah ran for and won a seat in the 19th legislature of the Michigan House of Representatives, as a Republican representing the newly formed Grand Traverse County. He served on the Federal Relations and Indian Affairs committees.

Hannah was a supporter and ally of Abraham Lincoln and the Union during the American Civil War. In 1862, Hannah gave a speech addressing 25 Union enlistees departing Traverse City, stating that they were "gallant men who have left their families and their workshops to fight the battles of their country". Hannah was a Republican elector from Michigan in the elections of 1864, 1888, and 1900. Furthermore, Hannah was a delegate to the Republican National Convention from Michigan in 1872, 1880, and 1888.

In 1881, the small community of Traverse City became a village, and Hannah became the town's first village president. He served two nonconsecutive terms, separated by Benjamin D. Ashton, a fellow Republican, physician, and Clermont County, Ohio native. On May 18, 1895, Traverse City was awarded a city charter by the Michigan Legislature. The office of village president was abolished, and Hannah automatically became the first mayor of Traverse City, serving until the end of that year.

Also In 1881, the Northern Michigan Asylum, later the Traverse City State Hospital, was established as the demand for a third psychiatric hospital in Michigan, in addition to those established in Kalamazoo and Pontiac, began to grow. Perry Hannah used his political influence to secure its location in Traverse City. The hospital opened in 1885, and operated until 1989.

== Personal life and death ==
In 1852, Hannah married Anna Amelia Flint of New York City. Together, they had three children: Julius (born 1858), Claribel (born 1864), and Hattie (born 1874). After living in a small cottage, the family moved into a new mansion located on Sixth Street in Traverse City. The mansion was completed in 1893, and continued to house members of the Hannah family until 1937.

Perry Hannah gravestone at Oakwood Cemetery in Traverse City

Hannah died at age 79 on August 16, 1904, at his home in Traverse City, after suffering a stroke. His funeral took place on August 25, and was buried at Traverse City's Oakwood Cemetery. After his death, his son Julius took over operations of the family company.

=== Legacy ===
Hannah's name can still be found throughout the Traverse City area. Hannah Park and Hannah Avenue in Traverse City both bear his name. Additionally, the small hamlet of Hannah and Hannah Road, in nearby Mayfield Township was also named after him.

Perry Hannah's Mansion on Sixth Street in Traverse City continues to be preserved, and today is home to Reynolds-Jonkhoff Funeral Home. The home has operated as a funeral home since 1937.

In 2015, a statue of Hannah was unveiled at the corner of Sixth and Union Streets in downtown Traverse City. A plaque honoring him as the "Father of Traverse City" is also at the site, now known as the "Perry Hannah Plaza".

== See also ==
- List of mayors of Traverse City, Michigan
- History of Northern Michigan
