= John T. Parsons =

American inventor (1913–2007)

- Born: October 11, 1913; Detroit
- Died: April 18, 2007 (aged 93); Traverse City
- Occupation: Inventor
- Spouse: Elizabeth Parsons (nee Elizabeth Mae Shaw)
- Children: Carl, John, Robert, Grant, David, Meredith
- Parent(s): Carl and Edith Thoren

John T. Parsons (October 11, 1913 – April 18, 2007) pioneered numerical control (NC) for machine tools in the 1940s.

These developments were done in collaboration with his Chief Engineer and Vice President of Engineering, Frank L. Stulen, who Parsons hired when he was head of the Rotary Wing Branch of the Propeller Lab at Wright-Patterson Air Force Base, in April 1946. Together, they were the first to use computer methods to solve machining problems, in particular, the accurate interpolation of the curves describing helicopter rotor blades. In 1946, "computer" still meant a punched-card operated calculation machine. In 1948, Parsons' company, "Parsons Corporation" of Traverse City, Michigan, was awarded a contract to make the challenging tapered wings for military aircraft; they won the contract because they developed the computer support to do the difficult three-dimensional interpolation for the complex shapes, as well as the 800 steps long production cycle for the wing manufacturing. IBM was one of the subcontractors, as was MIT, which took care of the servomechanisms. The latter lab boosted the developments of numerical control machining in the following decades, by developing reliable servo control in 1952 and the APT (Automatic Programmed Tool) programming language for NC machines.

Parsons, however, quickly saw the potential of connecting computers to the machine motors. On January 14, 1958, he received a patent for a Motor Controlled Apparatus for Positioning Machine Tool (patent number 2,820,187, filed on May 5, 1952).

The initial developments of NC machines, however, had been so expensive that Parsons was fired from his own company because the funding of the MIT developments was too much for the company. Parsons was reinstated as president of the company after royalties on the patent had generated significant amounts of money. (Bendix Corporation was an initial licensee of the patent, in 1955, and eventually bought all the rights to it.)

In 1985, Parsons and Stulen received the National Medal of Technology. In 1988 he received an honorary Doctor of Engineering degree from the University of Michigan. In 1993, Parsons (but not Stulen) was inducted into the National Inventors Hall of Fame for inventing numerical control.

Parsons died on April 18, 2007, at the Grand Traverse Pavilions. He was 93. He had six children.
