= Low-alloy special purpose steel =

Low-alloy special purpose steel is a grade of tool steel characterized by its proportion of iron to other elements, the kind of elements in its composition, and its treatment during the manufacturing process. The three ASTM established grades of low-alloy special purpose steel are L2, L3, and L6. This grade originally contained L1, L4, L5 and L7 as well as three F grades (F1, F2, and F3) but because of falling demand only grades L2 and L6 remain in production.

Grade	%C	%Cr	%Mn	%Mo	%P	%S	%Si	%V	Other	Rockwell hardness (C)
L2	0.45-1.0	0.7-1.2	0.1-0.9	0.25 max	0.030 max	0.030 max	0.1-0.5	0.1-0.3	S=0.06-0.15 if specified for machining; Ni+Cu<=0.75	45-63
L3	0.95-1.10	1.3-1.7	0.25-0.8	--	0.030 max	0.030 max	0.1-0.5	0.1-0.3	S=0.06-0.15 if specified for machining; Ni+Cu<=0.75	
L6	0.65-0.75	0.6-1.2	0.25-0.8	0.50 max	0.030 max	0.030 max	0.1-0.5	--	Ni=1.25-2.0;S=0.06-0.15 if specified for machining; Ni+Cu<=0.75	45-62

== L2 ==
L2 grade steel comes in medium-carbon (0.45%-0.65%) and high-carbon (0.65%-1.1%) formats.

== L6 ==
L6 is the most commonly encountered and most frequently made variety of these steels. It is known for its high wear resistance and its toughness.

== Applications ==
Applications for the L-series of tool steels have included precision gauges, bearings, rollers, cold-heading dies, swaging dies, feed fingers, spindles, jigs, shears, punches, and drills. They are also used for machining arbors, cams, chucks, and collets.
