= H13 =

H13, H-13 or H.13 may refer to:

== Roads ==
- H-13 (Michigan county highway), a road in the United States
- Highway H13 (Ukraine)

== Vehicles ==
- Bell H-13 Sioux, an American helicopter
- HMS H13, a H-class submarine ordered by but not commissioned into the Royal Navy
- Lioré et Olivier LeO H-13, a French flying boat
- LSWR H13 class, a British steam railcar

== Other uses ==
- DIN 1.2344 tool steel, a tool steel grade
- London Buses route H13, a public transportation route in England
- A class of high-efficiency particulate air filter
