= Tool steel 1.2344 =

Tool steel grade

Tool steel 1.2344 (also known as AISI H13 steel or just H13) is a tool steel grade standardised for hot working. The main feature of this grade is the combination of alloyed elements of chromium, molybdenum and vanadium, Cr-Mo-V, which provides a high wear resistance to thermal shock. It is well known as for its great strength, heat resistance and machinability. This tool steel is mostly used for aluminum, magnesium and zinc die casting, and in the cold heading field. The presence of high vanadium in DIN 1.2344 provides resistance to abrasion at both low and high temperatures.

The material number 1.2344 has been issued by Stahlinstitut VDEh and is standardised according to EN 10027. The AISI specification has been issued by American Iron and Steel Institute. Also it was standardised as SKD 61 by Japanese Industrial Standards.

The surface of this tool steel can be nitrided to improve wear resistance.

== Application ==
Tool steel 1.2344 is widely used in various places in both cold and hot working. In hot work processing it can be used for shear knives and dummy block extrusion. In cold work processing, this steel is used for punching, heading and inserting of die blocks. Tool steel 1.2344 is a high hot-wear resistance and great strength, warm conductivity air hardening and invulnerability to hot cracking. It has a great resistance to abrasion at each low and high temperature due to the presence of high vanadium. The high level of toughness and ductility made it a useful material for die casting and the cold heading field.

== Chemical composition ==
Elements	Content
Carbon	0.39
Silicon	1.00
Chromium	5.40
Molybdenum	1.35
Vanadium	1.00

== Extra reading ==
- Afazov, S. M.; Ratchev, S. M.; Segal, J. (28 December 2011). "Prediction and experimental validation of micro-milling cutting forces of AISI H13 steel at hardness between 35 and 60 HRC". The International Journal of Advanced Manufacturing Technology. 62 (9–12): 887–899. doi:10.1007/s00170-011-3864-7.
