= Tool steel =

Materials well-suited to be made into tools

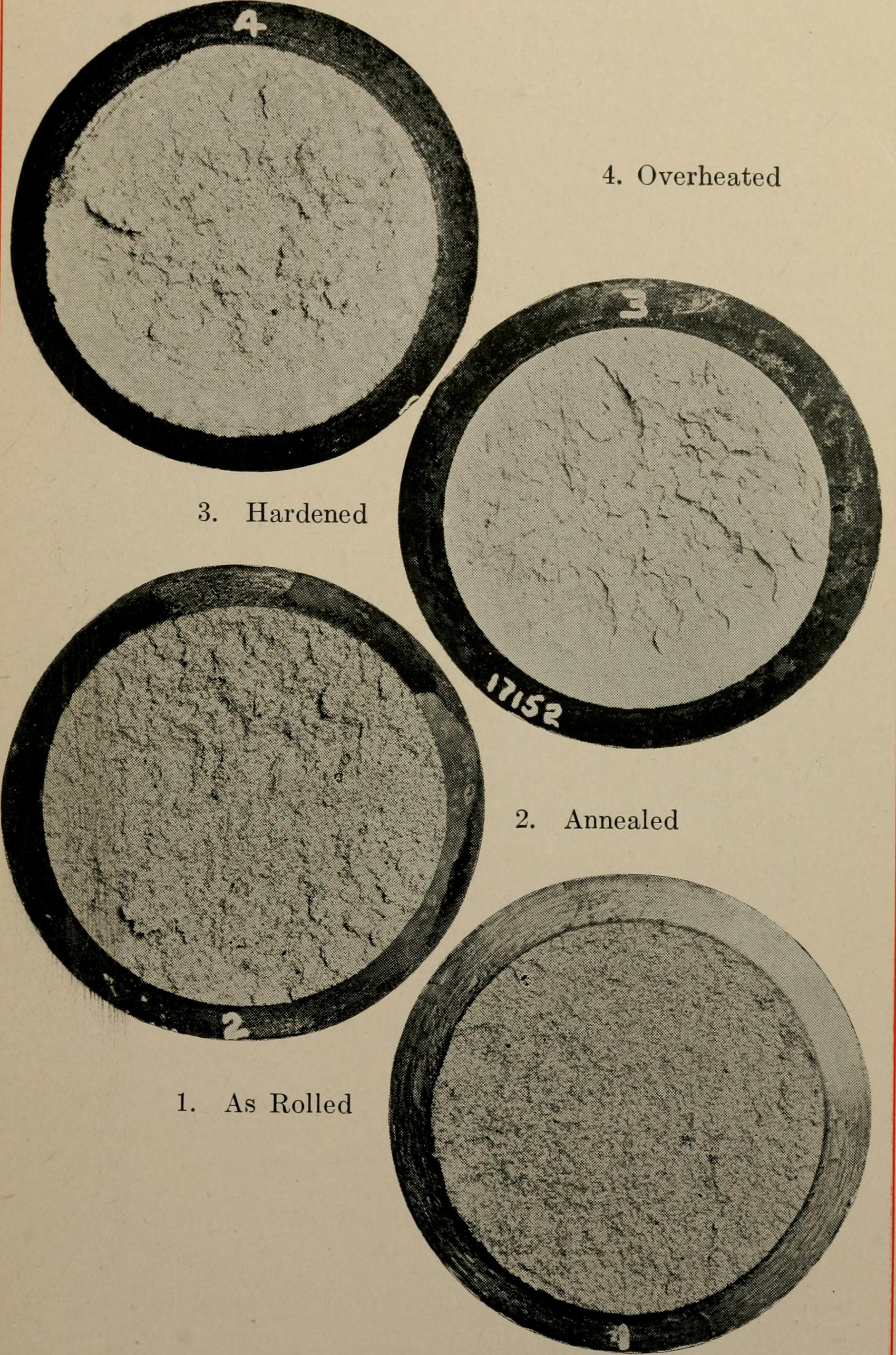

Tool steel is any of various carbon steels and alloy steels that are particularly well-suited to be made into tools and tooling, including cutting tools, dies, hand tools, knives, and others. Their suitability comes from their distinctive hardness, resistance to abrasion and deformation, and their ability to hold a cutting edge at elevated temperatures. As a result, tool steels are suited for use in the shaping of other materials, for example, in cutting, machining, stamping, or forging.

Tool steels generally have a carbon content between 0.5% and 1.3%. The presence of carbides in their matrix plays the dominant role in the qualities of tool steel. The four major alloying elements that form carbides in tool steel are: tungsten, chromium, vanadium, and molybdenum. The rate of dissolution of the different carbides into the austenite form of the iron determines the high-temperature performance of steel (slower is better, making for a heat-resistant steel). Proper heat treatment of these steels is important for adequate performance. The manganese content is often kept low to minimize the possibility of cracking during water quenching.

There are six groups of tool steels: water-hardening, cold-work, shock-resistant, high-speed, hot-work, and special-purpose. The choice of group to select depends on cost, working temperature, required surface hardness, strength, shock resistance, and toughness requirements. The more severe the service condition (higher temperature, abrasiveness, corrosiveness, loading), the higher the alloy content and consequent amount of carbides required for the tool steel.

Tool steels are used for cutting, pressing, extruding, and coining of metals and other materials. Their use in tooling is essential; injection molds for example require tool steels for their resistance to abrasion- an important criterion for mold durability which enables hundreds of thousands of moldings operations over its lifetime.

The AISI-SAE grades of tool steel is the most common scale used to identify various grades of tool steel. Individual alloys within a grade are given a number; for example: A2, O1, etc.

== Water-hardening group ==
W-group tool steel gets its name from its defining property of having to be water quenched. W-grade steel is essentially high carbon plain-carbon steel. This group of tool steel is the most commonly used tool steel because of its low cost compared to others. They work well for parts and applications where high temperatures are not encountered; above 150 °C (300 °F) it begins to soften to a noticeable degree. Its hardenability is low, so W-group tool steels must be subjected to a rapid quenching, requiring the use of water. These steels can attain high hardness (above 66 Rockwell C) and are rather brittle compared to other tool steels. W-steels are still sold, especially for springs, but are much less widely used than they were in the 19th and early 20th centuries. This is partly because W-steels warp and crack much more during quench than oil-quenched or air hardening steels.

The toughness of W-group tool steels is increased by alloying with manganese, silicon and molybdenum. Up to 0.20% of vanadium is used to retain fine grain sizes during heat treating.

Typical applications for various carbon compositions are for W-steels:

- 0.60–0.75% carbon: machine parts, chisels, setscrews; properties include medium hardness with good toughness and shock resistance.
- 0.76–0.90% carbon: forging dies, hammers, and sledges.
- 0.91–1.10% carbon: general purpose tooling applications that require a good balance of wear resistance and toughness, such as rasps, drills, cutters, and shear blades.
- 1.11–1.30% carbon: files, small drills, lathe tools, razor blades, and other light-duty applications where more wear resistance is required without great toughness. Steel of about 0.8% C gets as hard as steel with more carbon, but the free iron carbide particles in 1% or 1.25% carbon steel make it hold an edge better. However, the fine edge probably rusts off faster than it wears off, if it is used to cut acidic or salty materials.

== Cold-work group ==
The cold-work tool steels include the O series (oil-hardening), the A series (air-hardening), and the D series (high carbon-chromium). These are steels used to cut or form materials that are at low temperatures. This group possesses high hardenability and wear resistance, and average toughness and heat softening resistance. They are used in production of larger parts or parts that require minimal distortion during hardening. The use of oil quenching and air-hardening helps reduce distortion, avoiding the higher stresses caused by the quicker water quenching. More alloying elements are used in these steels, as compared to the water-hardening class. These alloys increase the steels' hardenability, and thus require a less severe quenching process and as a result are less likely to crack. They have high surface hardness and are often used to make knife blades. The machinability of the oil hardening grades is high but for the high carbon-chromium types is low.

=== Oil-hardening: the O series ===
This series includes an O1 type, an O2 type, an O6 type and an O7 type. All steels in this group are typically hardened at 800 °C (1,500 °F), oil quenched, then tempered below 200 °C (400 °F).

Grade	Composition	Notes
O1	0.90% C, 1.0–1.4% Mn, 0.50% Cr, 0.50% W, 0.30% Si, 0.20% V	A cold work steel used for gauges, cutting tools, woodworking tools and knives. It can be hardened to 66 Rockwell C (HRC), though it is typically used at 61-63 HRC. Vanadium is optional. Also sold as Arne, SKS3, 1.2510 and 100MnCrW4.
O2	0.90% C, 1.5–2.0% Mn, 0.30% Cr, 0.30% Si, 0.15% V	A cold work steel used for gauges, cutting tools, woodworking tools and knives. It can be hardened to 66 HRC, typically used at 61-63 HRC. Also sold as 1.2842 and 90MnCrV8.
O6	1.45% C, 1.0% Mn, 1.0% Si, 0.3% Mo	A cold work graphitic steel with outstanding resistance to metal-to-metal sliding wear and galling. Typically used for cams, bushings, sleeves, arbors, forming rolls, shear blades, punches, dies, and guides.

=== Air-hardening: the A series ===
The first air-hardening-grade tool steel was mushet steel, which was known as air-hardening steel at the time.

Modern air-hardening steels are characterized by low distortion during heat treatment because of their high chromium content. Their machinability is good and they have a balance of wear resistance and toughness (i.e. between the D and shock-resistant grades).

Grade	Composition	Notes
A2	1.0% C, 1.0% Mn, 5.0% Cr, 0.3% Ni, 1.0% Mo, 0.15–0.50% V	A common general purpose tool steel; it is the most commonly used variety of air-hardening steel. It is commonly used for blanking and forming punches, trimming dies, thread rolling dies, and injection molding dies.
A3	1.25% C, 0.5% Mn, 5.0% Cr, 0.3% Ni, 0.9–1.4% Mo, 0.8–1.4% V	
A4	1.0% C, 2.0% Mn, 1.0% Cr, 0.3% Ni, 0.9–1.4% Mo	
A6	0.7% C, 1.8–2.5% Mn, 0.9–1.2% Cr, 0.3% Ni, 0.9–1.4% Mo	This type of tool steel air-hardens at a relatively low temperature (approximately the same temperature as oil-hardening types) and is dimensionally stable. Therefore, it is commonly used for dies, forming tools, and gauges that do not require extreme wear resistance but do need high stability.
A7	2.00–2.85% C, 0.8% Mn, 5.00–5.75% Cr, 0.3% Ni, 0.9–1.4% Mo, 3.9–5.15% V, 0.5–1.5 W	
A8	0.5–0.6% C, 0.5% Mn, 4.75–5.50% Cr, 0.3% Ni, 1.15–1.65% Mo, 1.0–1.5 W	
A9	0.5% C, 0.5% Mn, 0.95–1.15% Si, 4.75–5.00% Cr, 1.25–1.75% Ni, 1.3–1.8% Mo, 0.8–1.4% V	
A10	1.25–1.50% C, 1.6–2.1% Mn, 1.0–1.5% Si, 1.55–2.05% Ni, 1.25–1.75% Mo	This grade contains a uniform distribution of graphite particles to increase machinability and provide self-lubricating properties. It is commonly used for gauges, arbors, shears, and punches.

=== High carbon-chromium: the D series ===
The D series of the cold-work class of tool steels, which originally included types D2, D3, D6, and D7, contains between 10% and 13% chromium (which is unusually high). These steels retain their hardness up to a temperature of 425 °C (800 °F). Common applications for these tool steels include forging dies, die-casting die blocks, and drawing dies. Due to their high chromium content, certain D-type tool steels are often considered stainless or semi-stainless, however their corrosion resistance is less than stainless steel due to the precipitation of the majority of their chromium and carbon constituents as carbides.

Grade	Composition	Notes
D2	1.5% C, 11.0–13.0% Cr; additionally 0.45% Mn, 0.030% P, 0.030% S, 1.0% V, 0.9% Mo, 0.30% Si	D2 is very wear resistant but not as tough as lower alloyed steels. The mechanical properties of D2 are very sensitive to heat treatment. It is widely used for the production of shear blades, planer blades and industrial cutting tools; sometimes used for knife blades.

== Shock-resisting group ==
The high shock resistance and good hardenability are provided by chromium-tungsten, silicon-molybdenum, silicon-manganese alloying. Shock-resisting group tool steels (S) are designed to resist shock at both low and high temperatures. A low carbon content is required for the necessary toughness (approximately 0.5% carbon). Carbide-forming alloys provide the necessary abrasion resistance, hardenability, and hot-work characteristics. This family of steels displays very high impact toughness and relatively low abrasion resistance and can attain relatively high hardness of 58 to 60 HRC. In the US, toughness usually derives from 1 to 2% silicon and 0.5–1% molybdenum content. In Europe, shock steels often contain 0.5–0.6% carbon and around 3% nickel. A range of 1.75% to 2.75% nickel is still used in some shock-resisting and high-strength low-alloy steels (HSLA), such as L6, 4340, and Swedish saw steel, but it is relatively expensive. An example of its use is in the production of jackhammer bits.

== Hot-working group ==
Hot-working steels are a group of steel used to cut or shape material at high temperatures. H-group tool steels were developed for strength and hardness during prolonged exposure to elevated temperatures. These tool steels are low carbon and moderate to high alloy that provide good hot hardness and toughness and fair wear resistance due to a substantial amount of carbide. H1 to H19 are based on a chromium content of 5%; H20 to H39 are based on a tungsten content of 9-18% and a chromium content of 3–4%; H40 to H59 are molybdenum based. Hot-work die steels can be produced by additive manufacturing, which allows conformal cooling channels to be integrated into dies for improved thermal control. A comparative study of fused deposition and sintering, binder jetting, laser powder bed fusion (LPBF) and directed energy deposition of the H13 grade found that only the melt-based LPBF and directed energy deposition routes reached near-full densification (porosity below 0.1%) with a stable martensitic structure and a hardness around 600 HV, whereas the sinter-based routes retained 6–9% porosity and were limited to low-density prototype applications.

Examples include DIN 1.2344 tool steel (H13).

== Special-purpose group ==
- P-type tool steel is short for plastic mold steels. They are designed to meet the requirements of zinc die casting and plastic injection molding dies.
- L-type tool steel is short for low-alloy special-purpose tool steel. L6 is extremely tough.
- F-type tool steel is water hardened and substantially more wear-resistant than W-type tool steel.

== Comparison ==
AISI-SAE tool steel grades
Defining property	AISI-SAE grade	Significant characteristics
Water-hardening	W	
Cold-working	O	Oil-hardening
Cold-working	A	Air-hardening; medium alloy
Cold-working	D	High carbon; high chromium
Shock resisting	S	
High speed	T	Tungsten base
High speed	M	Molybdenum base
Hot-working	H	H1–H19: chromium base H20–H39: tungsten base H40–H59: molybdenum base
Plastic mold	P	
Special purpose	L	Low alloy
Special purpose	F	Carbon tungsten

== See also ==
- Crucible Industries
- List of steel producers
- Silver steel

== Bibliography ==
- Baumeister, Avallone (1978). "6". Marks' Standard Handbook for Mechanical Engineers, 8th ed. McGraw Hill. pp. 33–34. ISBN 9780070041233.
- Degarmo, E. Paul; Black, J T.; Kohser, Ronald A. (2003), Materials and Processes in Manufacturing (9th ed.), Wiley, ISBN 0-471-65653-4.
- Oberg, Erik; Jones, Franklin D.; McCauley, Christopher J.; Heald, Ricardo M. (2004), Machinery's Handbook (27th ed.), Industrial Press, ISBN 978-0-8311-2700-8.
- Palmer, Frank R. (1937). Tool Steel Simplified: A handbook of modern practice for the man who makes tools (1st ed.). Reading, Pennsylvania: The Carpenter Steel Company. p. 10. LCCN 37006807. OCLC 3746717.
- Verhoeven, John (2007). Steel Metallurgy for the Non-Metallurgist. ASM International. p. 159. ISBN 978-0-87170-858-8.
