= Traverse City State Hospital =

- Northern Michigan Asylum
- U.S. National Register of Historic Places
- U.S. Historic district
- Michigan State Historic Site
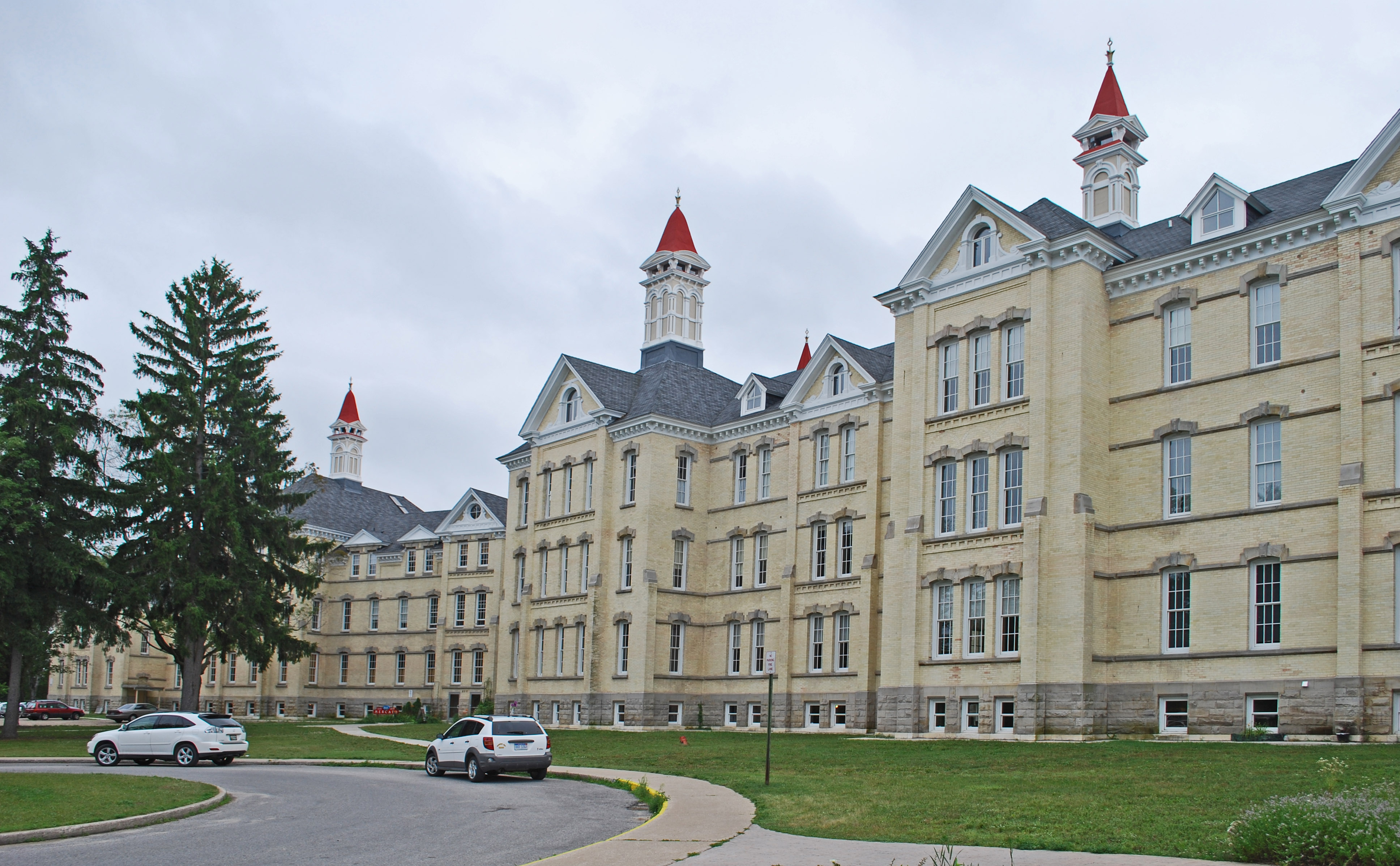

- Location within Michigan Location within the United States
- Interactive map
- Location: Bounded by C & O RR tracks, Division and 11th Sts., Elmwood Ave., Orange and Red Drs., Traverse City, Michigan
- Coordinates: 44°45′19″N 85°38′26″W
- Area: 135 acres (55 ha)
- Built: 1885
- Architect: Gordon W. Lloyd
- Architectural style: Italianate
- NRHP reference No.: 78001499

Significant dates
- Added to NRHP: October 03, 1978
- Designated MSHS: October 26, 1985

The Traverse City State Hospital, also known at various points as the Northern Michigan Asylum and the Traverse City Regional Psychiatric Hospital, is a decommissioned psychiatric hospital in Traverse City, Michigan. Established in 1881 by James Decker Munson and Perry Hannah, the hospital was in operation from 1885 to 1989. The site has since been redeveloped, reopening in 2002 as The Village at Grand Traverse Commons, a social center including shops, restaurants, office space, and residences.

The hospital is the last Kirkbride Building of the original four still standing in Michigan. It was listed on the National Register of Historic Places in 1978 and designated a Michigan State Historic Site in 1985.

== History ==
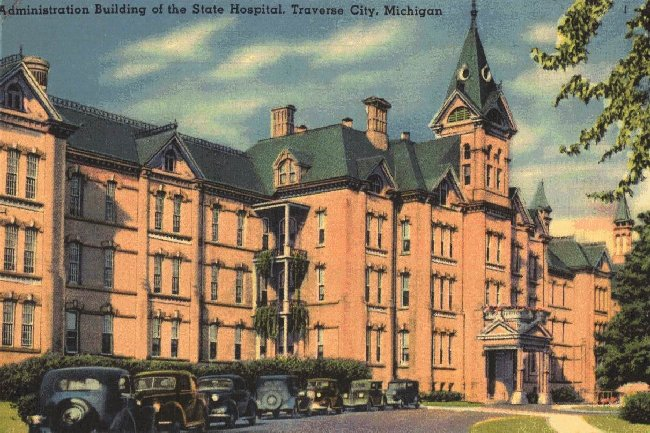
A postcard of Building 50 at the hospital, c. 1935

The Northern Michigan Asylum was established in 1881 as demand for a third psychiatric hospital in addition to those in Kalamazoo and Pontiac began to grow. Lumber baron Perry Hannah, "the father of Traverse City," used his political influence to secure its location in his home town. Under the supervision of prominent architect Gordon W. Lloyd, the first building, known as Building 50, was constructed in Victorian-Italianate style according to the Kirkbride Plan. The hospital opened in 1885 with 43 residents.

Under James Decker Munson, the first superintendent from 1885 to 1924, the institution expanded. Twelve housing cottages and two infirmaries were built between 1887 and 1903 to meet the specific needs of male and female patients. The institution became the city's largest employer and contributed to its growth. In the 1930s three large college-like buildings were constructed near the present site of the Munson Hospital parking deck and the Grand Traverse Pavilions.

Long before the advent of drug therapy in the 1950s, Munson was a firm believer in the "beauty is therapy" philosophy. Patients were treated through kindness, comfort, pleasure, and beautiful flowers provided year-round by the asylum's own greenhouses and the variety of trees Munson planted on the grounds. Restraints, such as the straitjacket, were forbidden. Also, as part of the "work is therapy" philosophy, the asylum provided opportunities for patients to gain a sense of purpose through farming, furniture construction, fruit canning, and other trades that kept the institution fully self-sufficient. The asylum farm began in 1885 with the purchase of some milk cows and within a decade grew to include pigs, chickens, milk and meat cows, and many vegetable fields. In the 1910s-30s, the farm was home to a world champion milk cow, Traverse Colantha Walker. Her grave is at the end of the dirt trail between the farm and the asylum.

While the hospital was established for the care of the mentally ill, its use expanded during outbreaks of tuberculosis, typhoid, diphtheria, influenza, and polio. It also cared for the elderly, served as a rehab for drug addicts, and was used to train nurses. After Munson's retirement, James Decker Munson Hospital was established in his honor on the grounds in 1926, and was operated by the state well after his death and into the 1950s. It was then replaced by Munson Medical Center in the 1950s, the largest hospital in northern Michigan and one of the largest in the state. A portrait of Dr. Munson hangs inside the main lobby of Munson Medical Center. By the time it closed in 1989, pieces of the property had been split between Munson hospital, the Pavilions, Garfield Township and (later) The Minervini Group.

Changes in the law and mental health care philosophies brought on the decline of the institution. The farm on the grounds closed in the 1950s, with most of its buildings demolished in the mid-1970s. In 1963, the main 1885 center wing of Building 50 was destroyed because it was deemed a fire hazard and a new modern building was put up in its place. Use of the hospital slowly declined, and it was closed in 1989, with a loss of over 200 jobs to the local economy.

== Current status ==
Over the next decade, the community struggled with plans for reuse of the hospital grounds. In 1993, the property was transferred from the state to the Grand Traverse Commons Redevelopment Corporation. Some of the less historic buildings were demolished. Several redevelopment plans were proposed, but nothing came to fruition until 2000, when the Minervini Group began negotiating with the Grand Traverse Commons Redevelopment Corporation and secured an agreement to renovate the historic buildings. Their efforts have led to the gradual but successful preservation and re-use of the former Building 50 as part of The Village at Grand Traverse Commons, a residential and commercial development.

As of 2014, these buildings and cottages are occupied or being close to completion on the Minervini Groups property of the state hospital. Building 50, 56, 58, 60, 61, 63, 67, and 69 are all occupied. Cottages 19, 20, and 36 are all occupied. The farmstead is not part of the Minervini Group; the owners are Garfield Township Parks and Recreation. But the visitor center and botanical garden are all volunteered. Projects that are done turning one of the former granary building into a pavilion, however the basement still exist under the concrete floor. Another building was turned into a visitor center and one of the two cathedral barns has been done. The barn will increase event space in the park. In 2015, a reflection pool using a former silo foundation was developed and more gardens were planted. A partly burnt horse barn is intended to be transformed into a wall garden using its stone foundation.

== Description ==
The Traverse City State Hospital contains multiple buildings located on a large rolling campus. Many of the buildings are constructed from matching buff brick from the Markham brickyard in nearby Greilickville. Building 50, the visual centerpiece of the complex, is a three-story building on a stone foundation containing 386,740 square feet of space. Towers, bracketed eaves, and dormers demonstrate a Victorian ambiance. Much of the property adjacent the complex has been converted to public land, including sprawling hiking trails and redeveloped cattle barns once utilized by the hospital, today known as Historic Barns Park. Kids Creek and its tributaries flow through the complex.

== Gallery ==
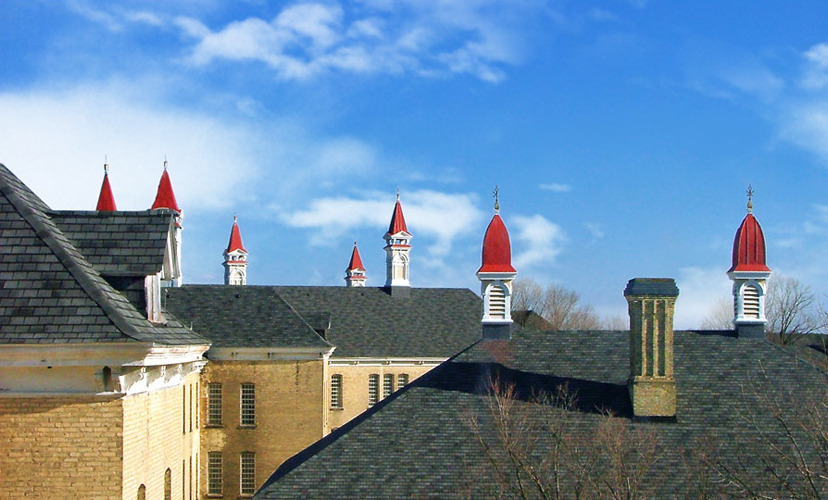
Roof of Building 50

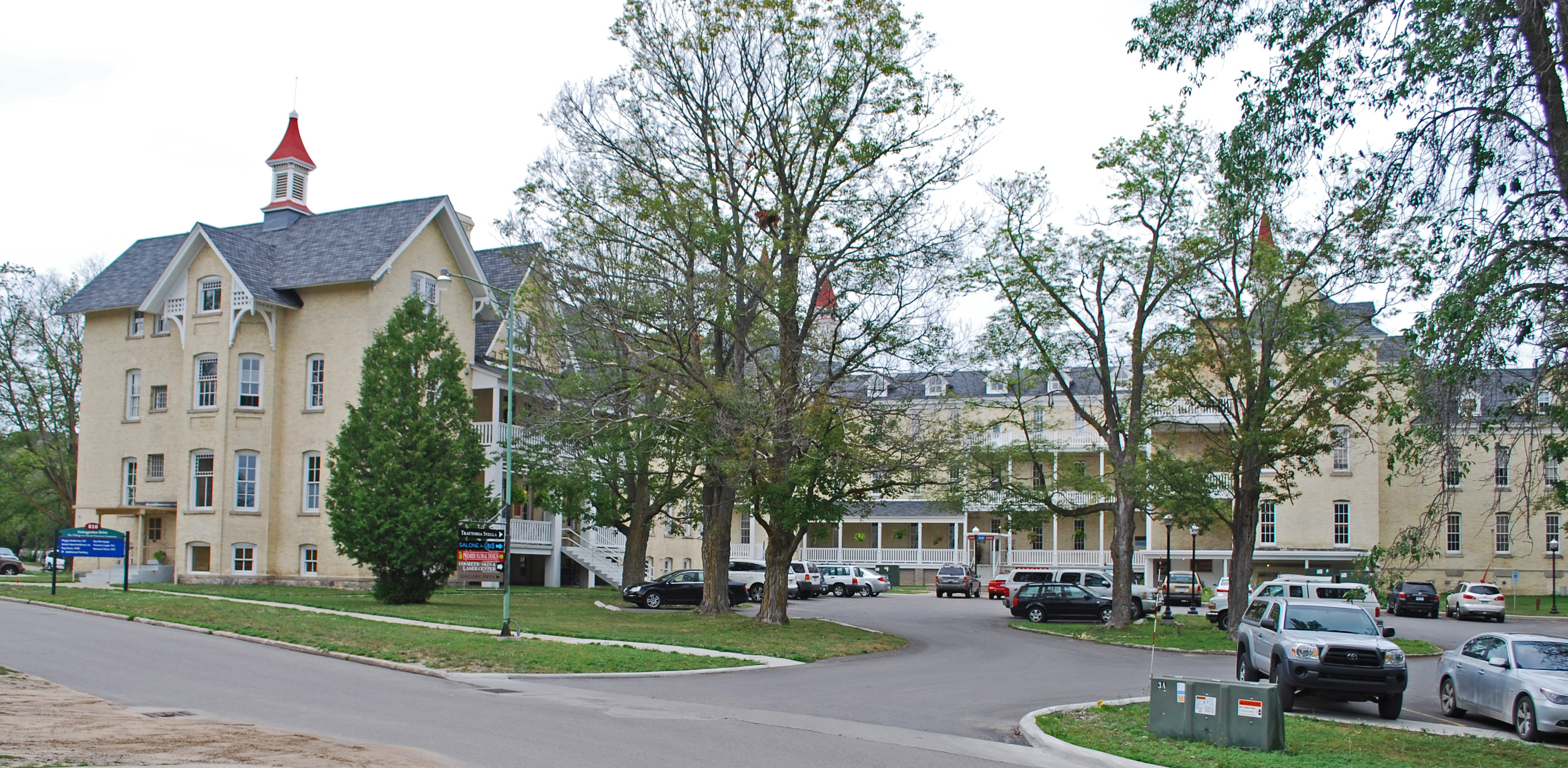
Rear of Building 50

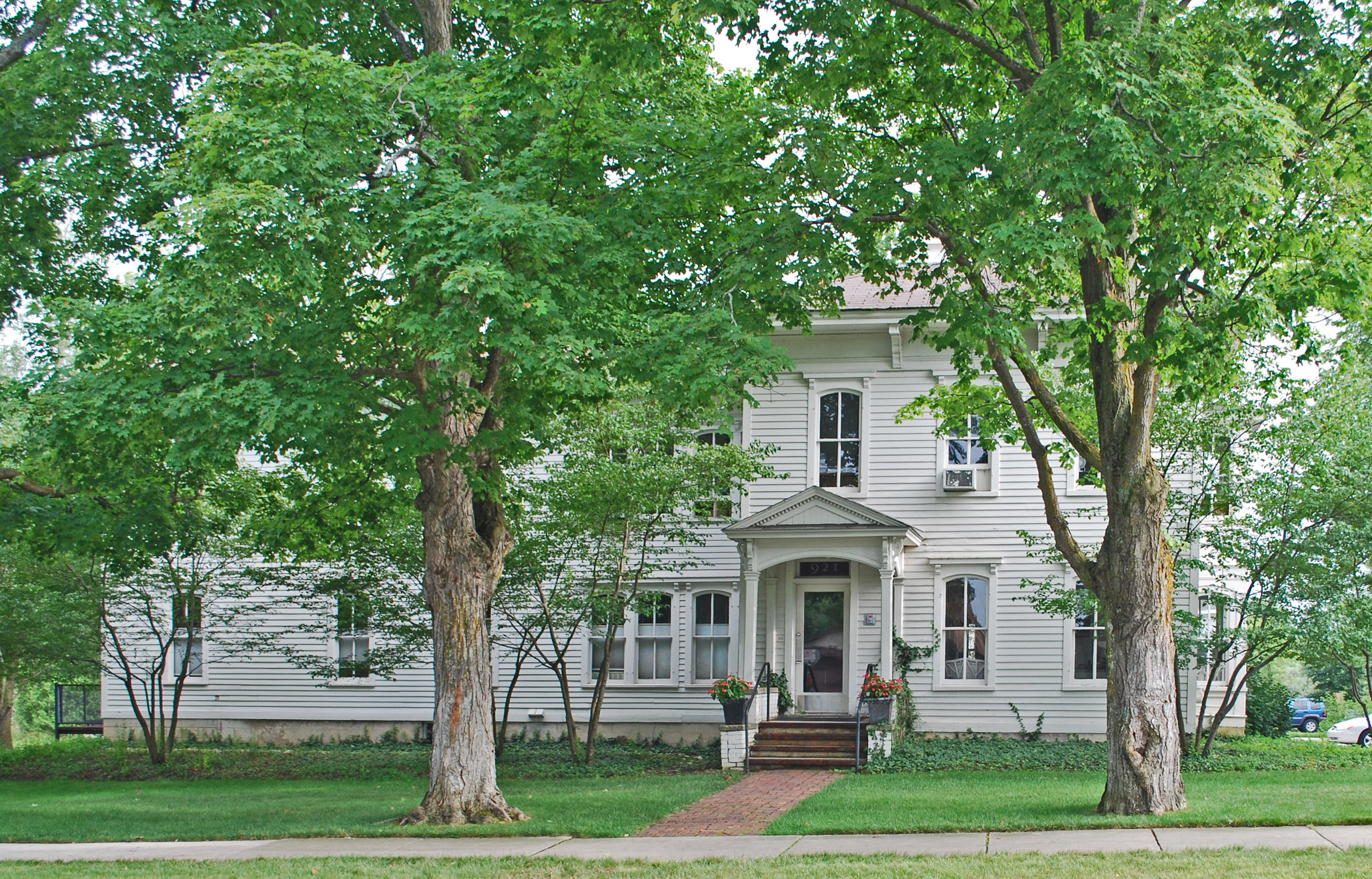
House on grounds

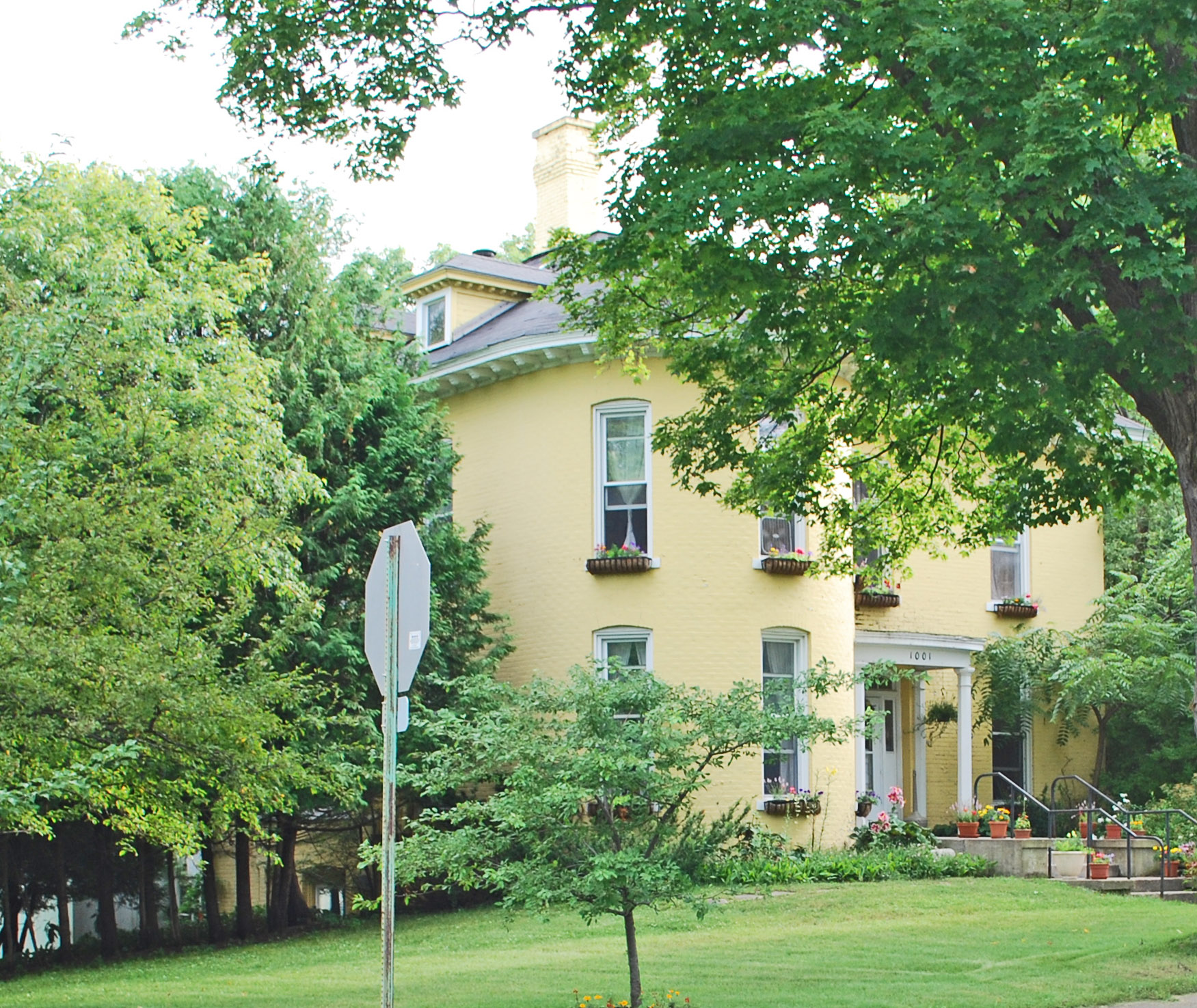
House on grounds

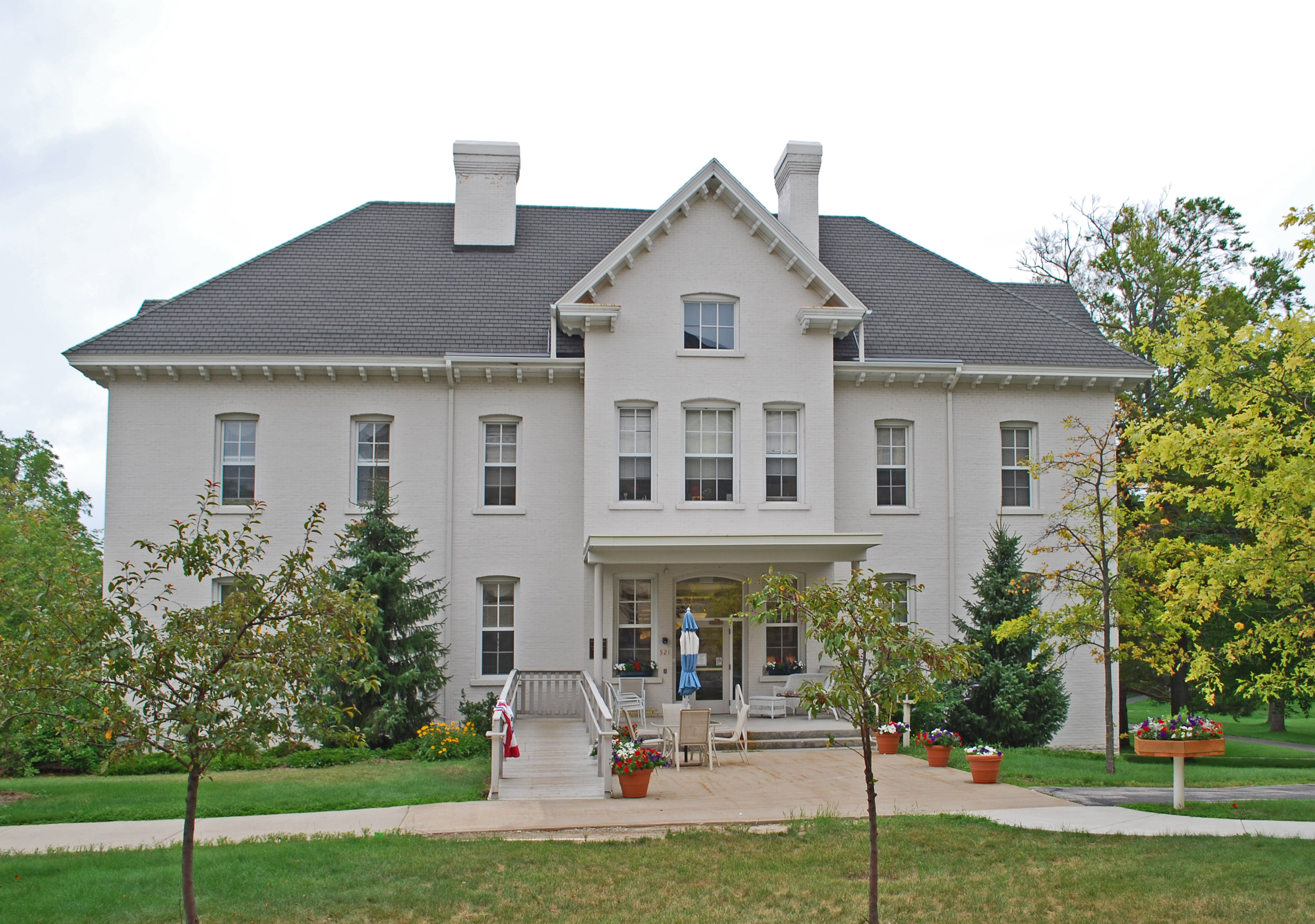
Outbuilding

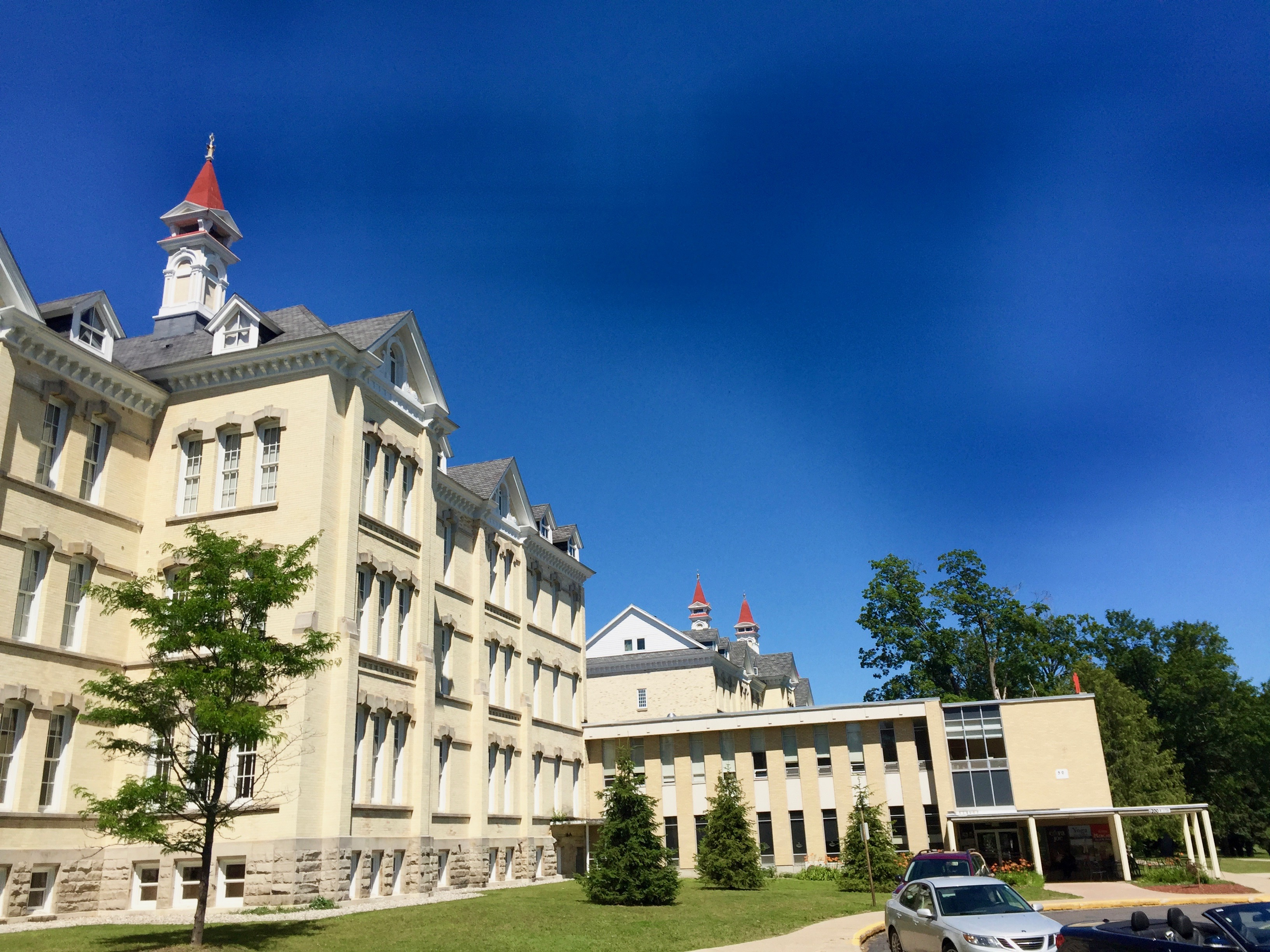
View of the former main entrance to the hospital

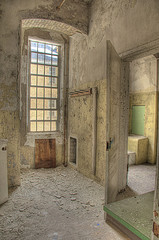
Interior of an not-yet renovated room

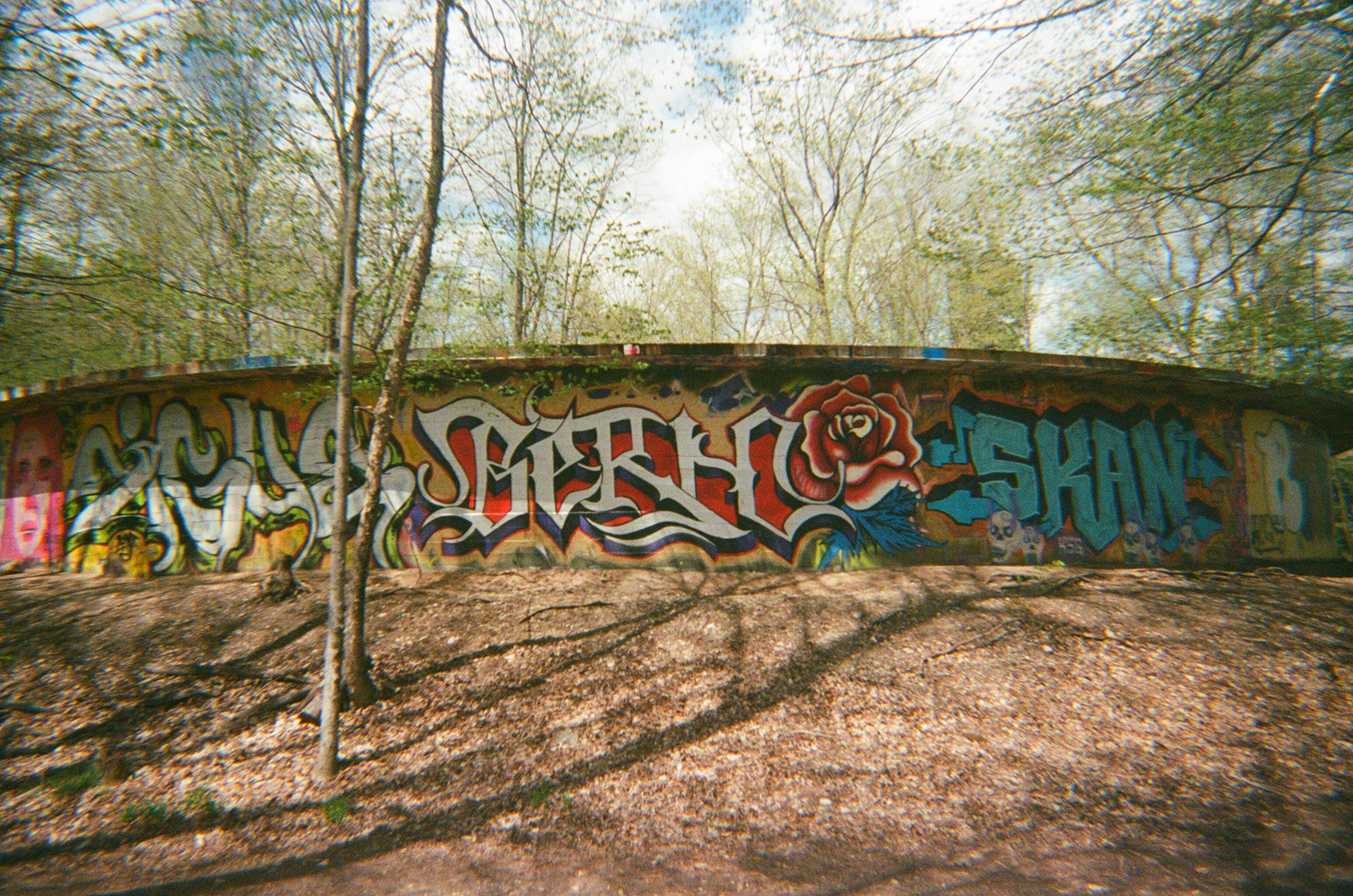
Abandoned cistern atop a hill overlooking the hospital site

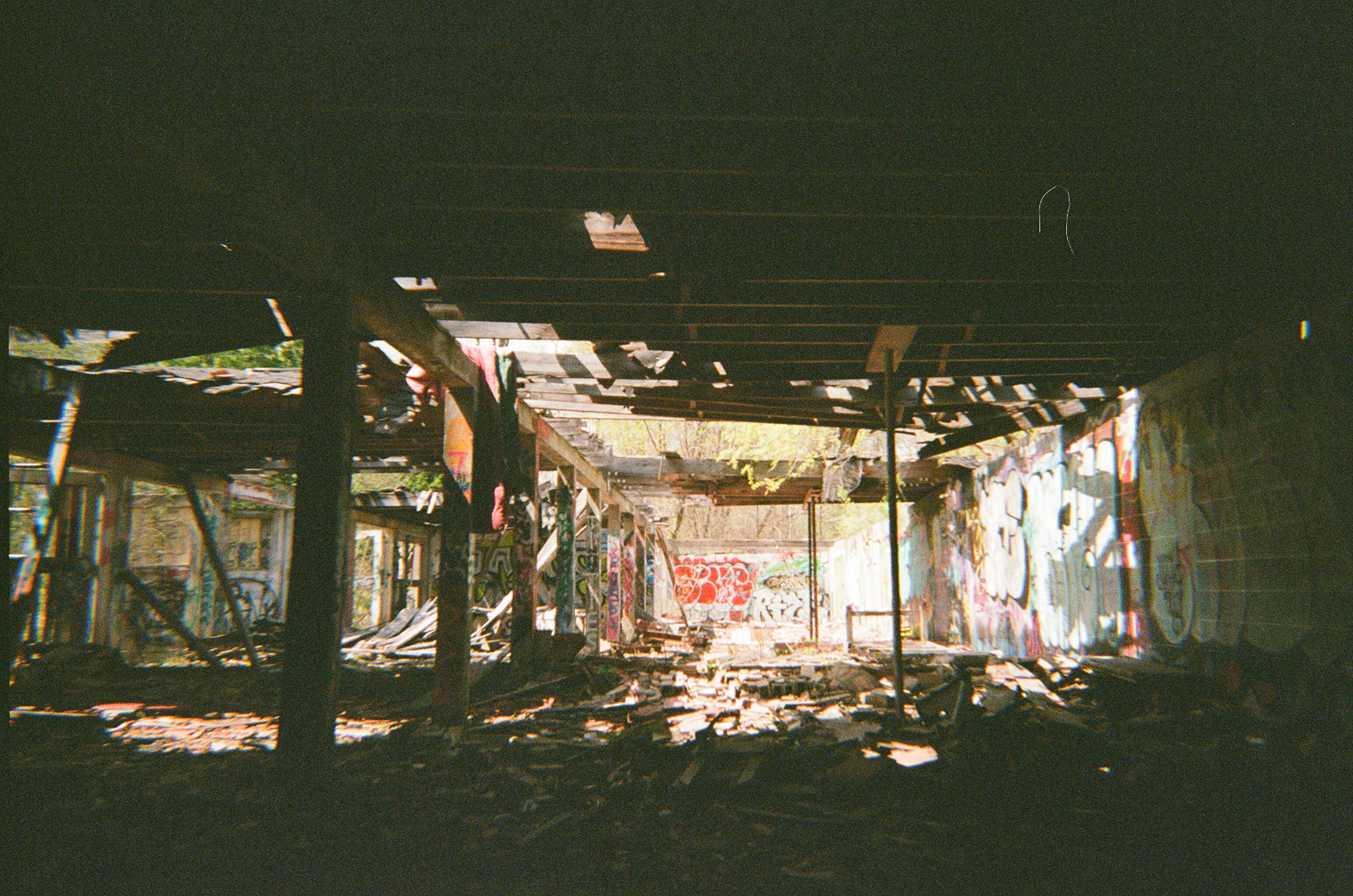
Interior of an abandoned building at the site

== See also ==
- Mental hospitals
- Psychiatry
- Kirkbride Plan
