= PTP4A2 =

Protein-coding gene in humans

Identifiers
- Aliases: PTP4A2, HH13, HH7-2, HU-PP-1, OV-1, PRL-2, PRL2, PTP4A, PTPCAAX2, ptp-IV1a, ptp-IV1b, protein tyrosine phosphatase type IVA, member 2, protein tyrosine phosphatase 4A2
- External IDs: OMIM: 601584; MGI: 1277117; GeneCards: PTP4A2
Enzyme activity
EC #	BRENDA	ExPASy	KEGG	MetaCyc
3.1.3.48	↗	↗	↗	↗

Gene location (Human)
Chr.	Chromosome 1 (human)
Band	1p35.2	Start	31,906,421 bp
Band	1p35.2	End	31,944,856 bp

Gene location (Mouse)
Chr.	Chromosome 4 (mouse)
Band	4|4 D2.2	Start	129,705,012 bp
Band	4|4 D2.2	End	129,743,796 bp
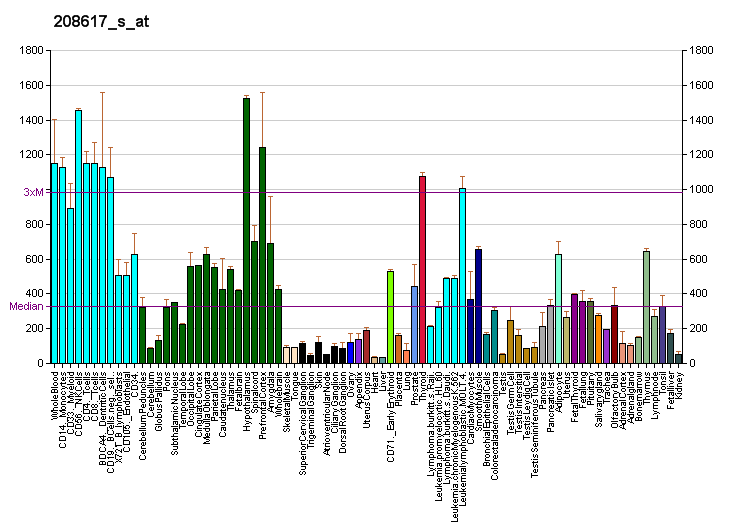

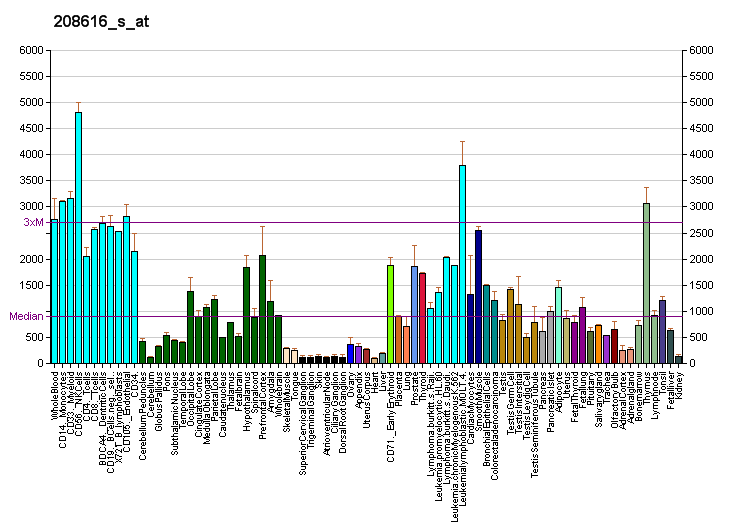

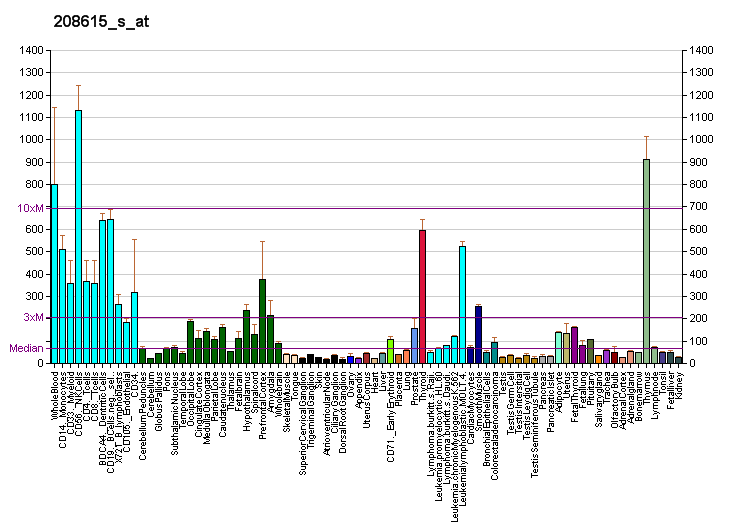
RNA expression pattern
Bgee	Human / Mouse (ortholog); Top expressed in: corpus callosum; internal globus pallidus; inferior ganglion of vagus nerve; palpebral conjunctiva; middle frontal gyrus; optic nerve; external globus pallidus; parotid gland; medulla oblongata; ventral tegmental area / Top expressed in: tail of embryo; extensor digitorum longus muscle; triceps brachii muscle; genital tubercle; vastus lateralis muscle; plantaris muscle; muscle of thigh; gastrocnemius muscle; skeletal muscle tissue; extraocular muscle; More reference expression data
BioGPS	More reference expression data
Gene ontology
Molecular function	prenylated protein tyrosine phosphatase activity; protein tyrosine phosphatase activity; phosphatase activity; phosphoprotein phosphatase activity; hydrolase activity; protein binding
Cellular component	cytoplasm; endosome; plasma membrane; early endosome; membrane; nucleus; cytosol
Biological process	protein dephosphorylation; dephosphorylation; peptidyl-tyrosine dephosphorylation; post-translational protein modification
Sources:Amigo / QuickGO
Orthologs
Databases	NCBI: entry; OMA: entry
Species	Human	Mouse
Entrez	8073	19244
Ensembl	ENSG00000184007	ENSMUSG00000028788
UniProt	Q12974	O70274
RefSeq (mRNA)	NM_001195100; NM_001195101; NM_003479; NM_080391; NM_080392 NM_001369858; NM_001369859; NM_001369860	NM_001164745; NM_008974
RefSeq (protein)	NP_001182029; NP_001182030; NP_536316; NP_001356787; NP_001356788 NP_001356789	NP_001158217; NP_033000
Location (UCSC)	Chr 1: 31.91 – 31.94 Mb	Chr 4: 129.71 – 129.74 Mb
PubMed search
- Wikidata
View/Edit Human	View/Edit Mouse

Protein tyrosine phosphatase type IVA 2 is an enzyme that in humans is encoded by the PTP4A2 gene.

The protein encoded by this gene belongs to a small class of the protein tyrosine phosphatase (PTP) family. PTPs are cell signaling molecules that play regulatory roles in a variety of cellular processes. PTPs in this class contain a protein tyrosine phosphatase catalytic domain and a characteristic C-terminal prenylation motif.

This PTP has been shown to primarily associate with plasmic and endosomal membrane through its C-terminal prenylation. This PTP was found to interact with the beta-subunit of Rab geranylgeranyltransferase II (beta GGT II), and thus may function as a regulator of GGT II activity.

Overexpression of this gene in mammalian cells conferred a transformed phenotype, which suggested its role in tumorigenesis. Alternatively spliced transcript variants that encode two distinct isoforms have been described.
