= Perry Hannah House =

Historic house in Michigan, United States

- U.S. National Register of Historic Places
- Michigan State Historic Site
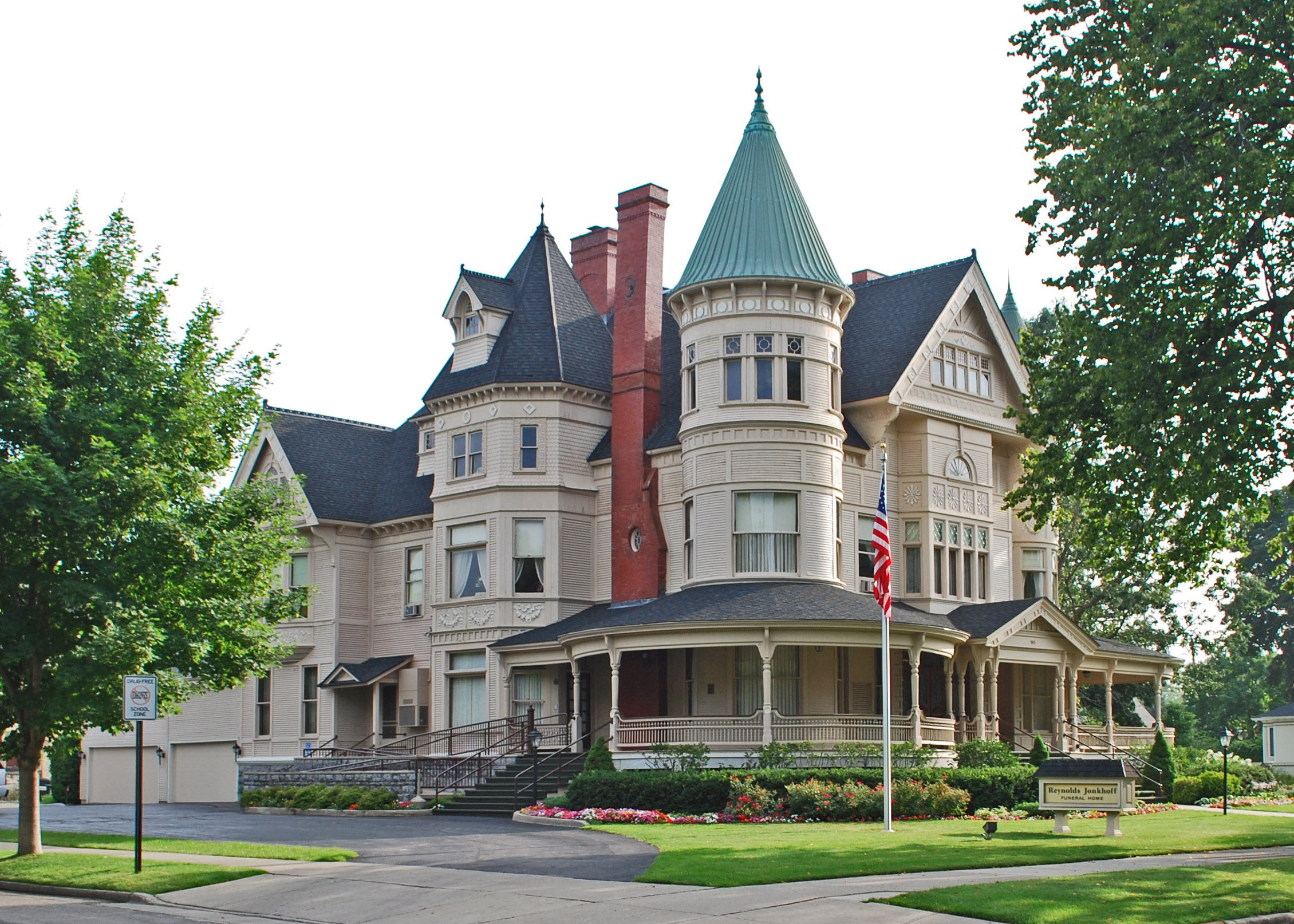

- Location within Michigan Location within the United States
- Interactive map showing the location for Perry Hannah House
- Location: 305 6th St., Traverse City, Michigan
- Coordinates: 44°45′40″N 85°37′36″W
- Area: 1 acre (0.40 ha)
- Built: 1891
- Architect: William G. Robinson
- Architectural style: Queen Anne
- NRHP reference No.: 72000617

Significant dates
- Added to NRHP: March 16, 1972
- Designated MSHS: October 29, 1971

The Perry Hannah House, also known as the Reynolds-Jonkhoff Funeral Home, is a house located at 305 6th Street in Traverse City, Michigan. It was designated a Michigan State Historic Site in 1971 and listed on the National Register of Historic Places in 1972.

== History ==
Perry Hannah was born in 1824 in Erie County, Pennsylvania, the son of E. L. and Ann Hannah. In 1837 the Hannahs moved to St. Clair County, Michigan, and Perry soon was employed in rafting logs from Port Huron to Detroit. He was later employed in a Port Huron store, but in 1846 moved to Chicago to clerk at a lumberyard. In 1850, he formed a partnership with A. Tracy Lay and James Morgan, called Hannah, Lay, and Co. In 1851, the firm purchased land near Traverse City and began logging.

In 1852, Hannah married Ann Amelia Flynn; the couple had three children. In 1854 the Hannahs permanently moved to Traverse City, where Perry Hannah guided Hannah, Lay, and Co. to immense profits, expanding into banking, milling, real estate, and wholesale and retail sales. In 1886, they divested the lumbering portion of the business. By the 1890s, Hannah, Lay, and Co. was worth tens of millions of dollars.

The Perry Hannah House was designed in 1891 by Grand Rapids architect William G. Robinson for Hannah. It was completed in 1893. Hannah used the house as his retirement home, living there until his death in 1904. The house then passed to his daughter-in-law, Elsie Hannah. Years later, unable to afford the upkeep of the house, Elsie Hannah planned to demolish it. However, demolition also proved too costly, and she donated the house to the American Legion. The Legion sold it to the owner of Weaver's Funeral Home, who converted it into a funeral parlor, making almost no alterations to the original house. In 1976, the Reynolds-Jonkhoff Funeral Home began using the home; they still operate it and maintain the house.

== Description ==
The Perry Hannah House occupies a large double lot on the corner of Sixth and Pine streets. It is a three-story asymmetric brick Queen Anne structure clad with clapboard siding and round corner turrets. The house sits on a granite foundation and is capped with a hip roof; a wide veranda nearly encircles the structure. A 2 1/2-story carriage house, now used as a garage, sits behind the house.

Inside the house are 40 rooms located on four floors, with a total of 14,000 square feet (1,300 m^{2}). The house contains ten fireplaces, eight with handmade Venetian tiles. The woodwork features many types of wood, including cherry, birch, beech, birds-eye and curly maple, oak, dark oak, walnut, and Brazilian mahogany.
